= 2018 Winter Olympics opening ceremony =

- Part of 2018 Winter Olympics
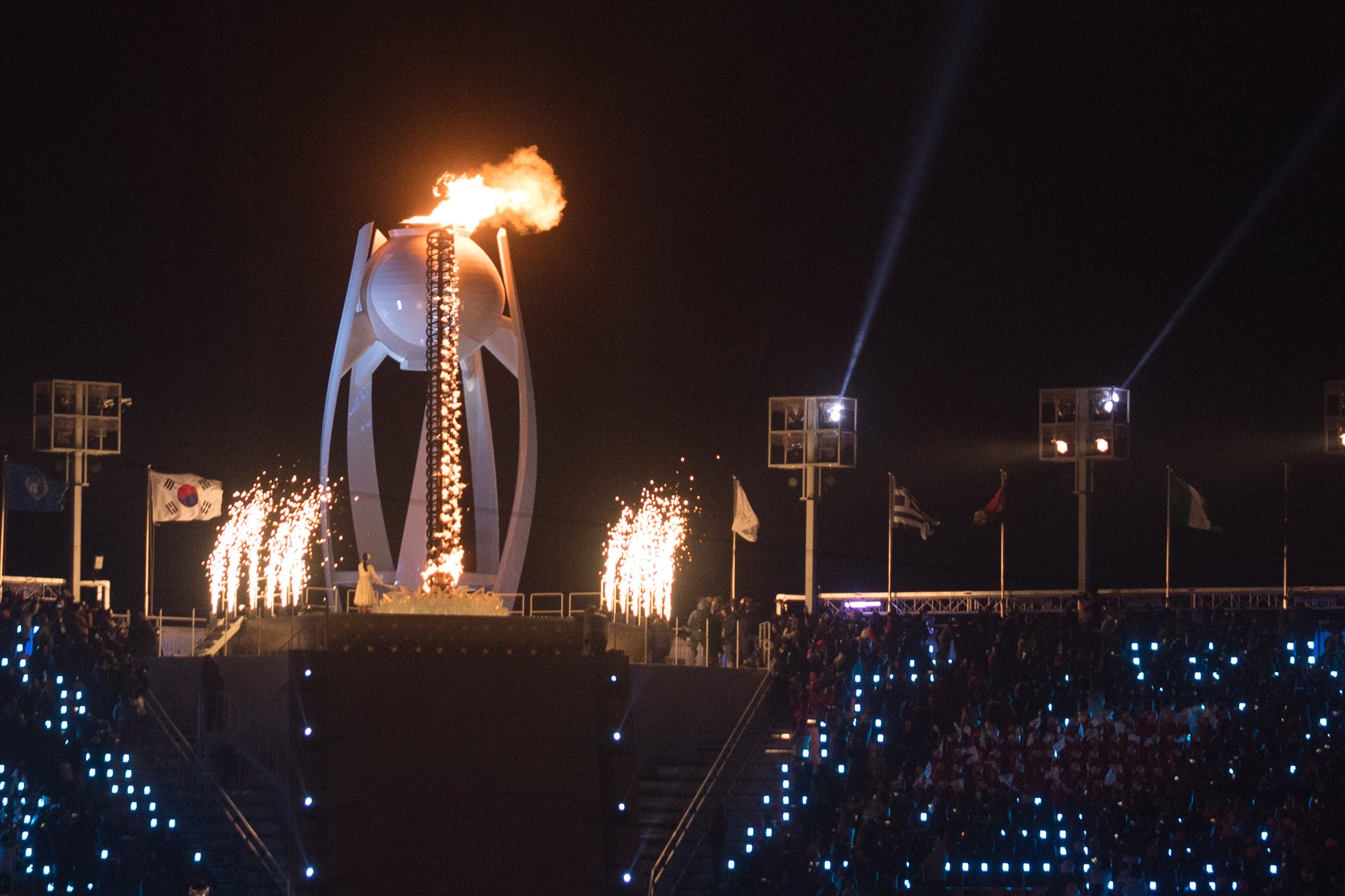
- Yuna Kim, South Korean Olympic figure skating champion, lights the Olympic cauldron
- Date: 9 February 2018; 8 years ago
- Time: 20:00–22:20 KST (UTC+9)
- Venue: Pyeongchang Olympic Stadium
- Location: Pyeongchang, South Korea; 37°40′03″N 128°42′20″E
- Also known as: Peace in Motion
- Filmed by: Olympic Broadcasting Services (OBS)
- Footage: PyeongChang 2018 Opening Ceremony on YouTube

The opening ceremony of the 2018 Winter Olympics was held at the Pyeongchang Olympic Stadium in Pyeongchang, South Korea on 9 February 2018. It began at 20:00 and finished at approximately 22:20 local time. The Games were officially opened by President Moon Jae-in. This was the first Winter Olympics opening ceremony since 2006 to take place in an outdoor stadium.

== Preparations ==
The site of the opening ceremony, Pyeongchang Olympic Stadium, was built specifically for the Games. The pentagonal stadium seated 35,000. The organizers for the event said the shape was chosen because it is a combination of different traditional shapes - a circle, a square, and a triangle, which represent heaven, earth, and mankind. No Olympic or Paralympic events were held at the stadium, which was only used for the opening and closing ceremonies. The venue was torn down afterwards.

The broadcast of the Opening Ceremony of the 2018 Winter Olympic Games was available in more than 200 countries around the world.

== Ceremony ==
The ceremony's message centered on peace, passion, harmony, and convergence.

Five children from rural Gangwon province led the ceremony, and were used to symbolize the five Olympic rings, with their names being chosen to represent fire, water, wood, metal, and earth, the five elements that are believed to make up the Earth.

Augmented reality and 5G technology were also incorporated in the event. The largest drone show in history, featuring 1,218 Shooting Star drones, was planned for the ceremony but cancelled at the last minute; television audiences were shown a version that had been recorded the previous December.

During the opening ceremony the organizing committee was a victim of a cyber attack, but without major consequences.

== Proceedings ==
=== Countdown ===
The ceremony began with a short film set in Incheon International Airport and across South Korea, depicting the posters of the previous editions of the Games. When the video arrived at the Sangwon Temple, the feed cut to a live shot of the stage, with a recreation of The Bell of Sangwon Temple standing in the centre. The countdown then took place around the bell.

=== The Land of Peace ===
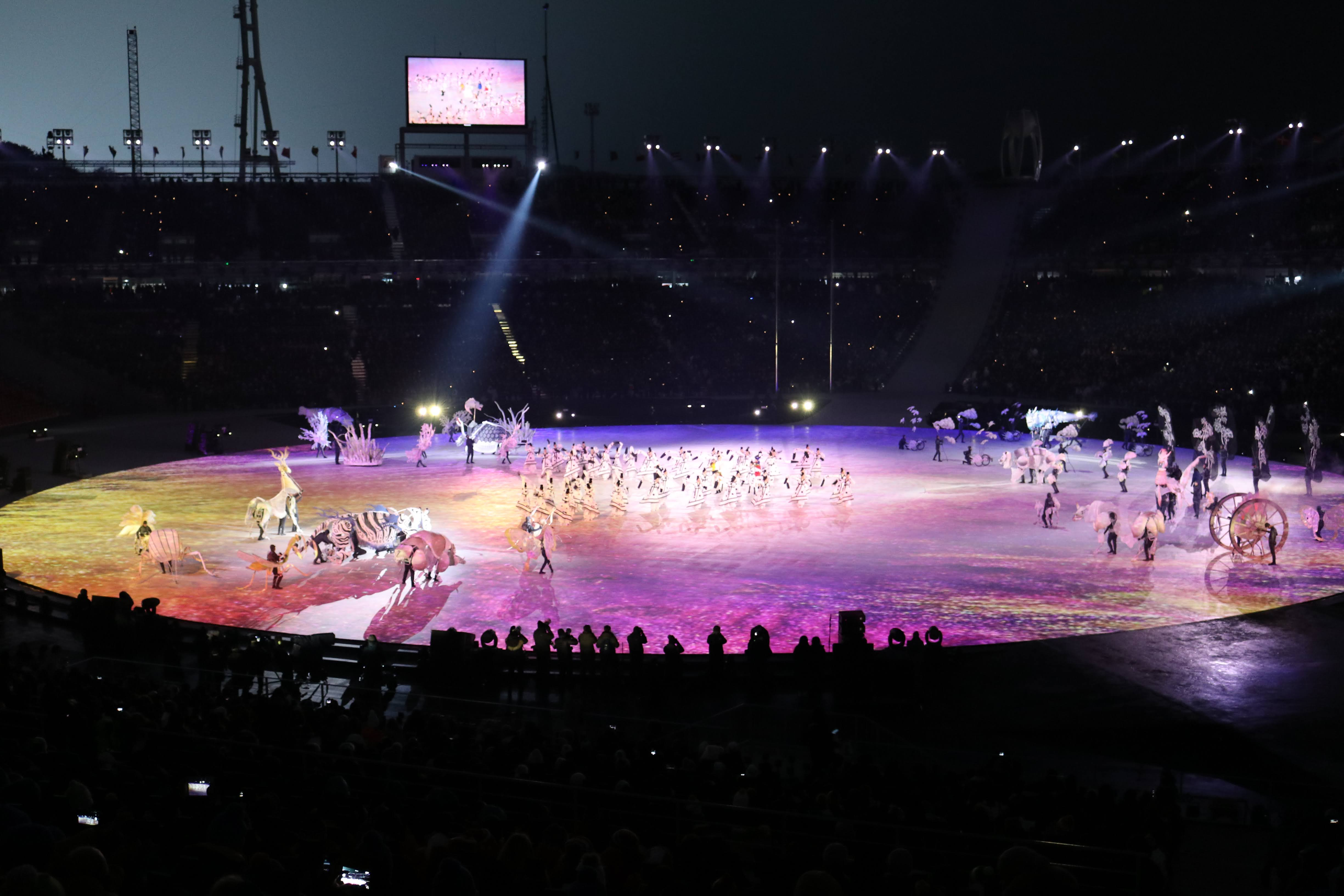
Performers during "The Land of Peace" segment

A video introducing the five children from rural Gangwon was shown. In the video, they are shown entering a cave, and are guided out by a white tiger, with the feed once again transitioning to a live shot of the five children with the tiger inside the stadium. As they crossed the stage, a depiction of the Baekdudaegan mountain range was projected onto it.

They were joined by performers handling puppets resembling the flora and fauna of Gangwon Province, as well as the four guardians - the white tiger, a blue dragon, a vermillion bird, and a black tortoise. As the segment progressed, an Inmyeonjo appeared on center stage representing peace.

The segment ended as an augmented reality constellation dome rose over the stage.

=== Entrance of the President of the Republic of Korea ===
Moon Jae-in, President of the Republic of Korea, and Thomas Bach, President of the International Olympic Committee were introduced.

=== Taegeuk: Harmony of the Cosmos ===
White light then illuminated the stadium as 371 janggu players performed on stage. They performed a janggu dance, and the segment culminated with the performers changing their costumes from white to red and blue, taking the form of the Taegeuk.

=== Korean National Flag and Anthem ===
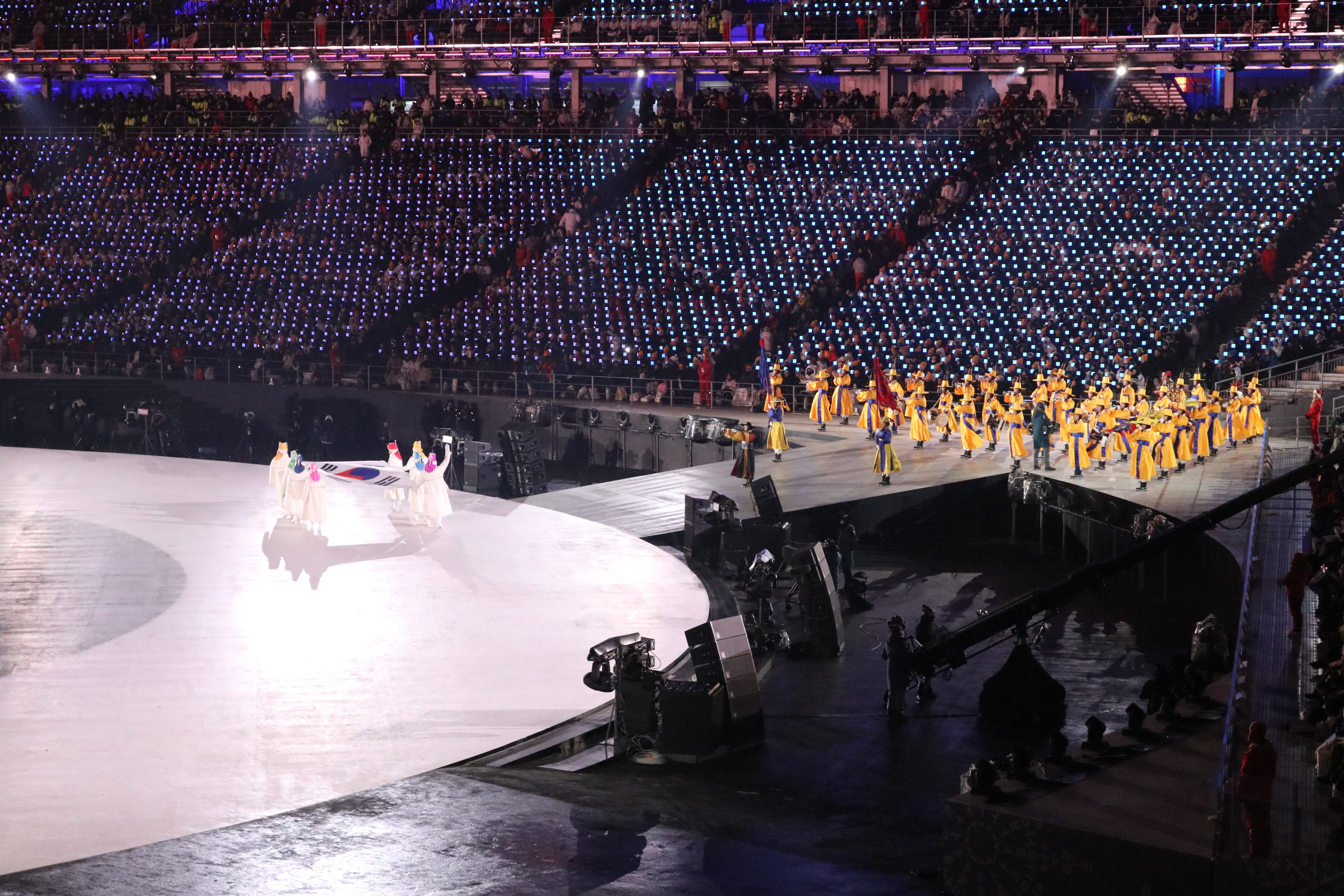
The South Korean flag carried across the stadium

With the formation of the Taegeuk on stage, the National Flag entered the stadium, carried by notable Korean athletes. As they carried the flag across the stadium, they were joined in the stadium by the Ministry of National Defense Traditional Honour Guard and Traditional Band, who performed daechwita, or traditional marching music, a form of chwita music.

The flag was then raised, with The Rainbow Choir, consisting of 75 children from multicultural families, performing the National Anthem.

=== Parade of Nations ===
The Parade of Nations was led, according to custom due to hosting the original ancient Olympics, by the Greek team, followed by other competing countries in alphabetical order based on their names in the Korean language, with the host country, South Korea, concluding the march.

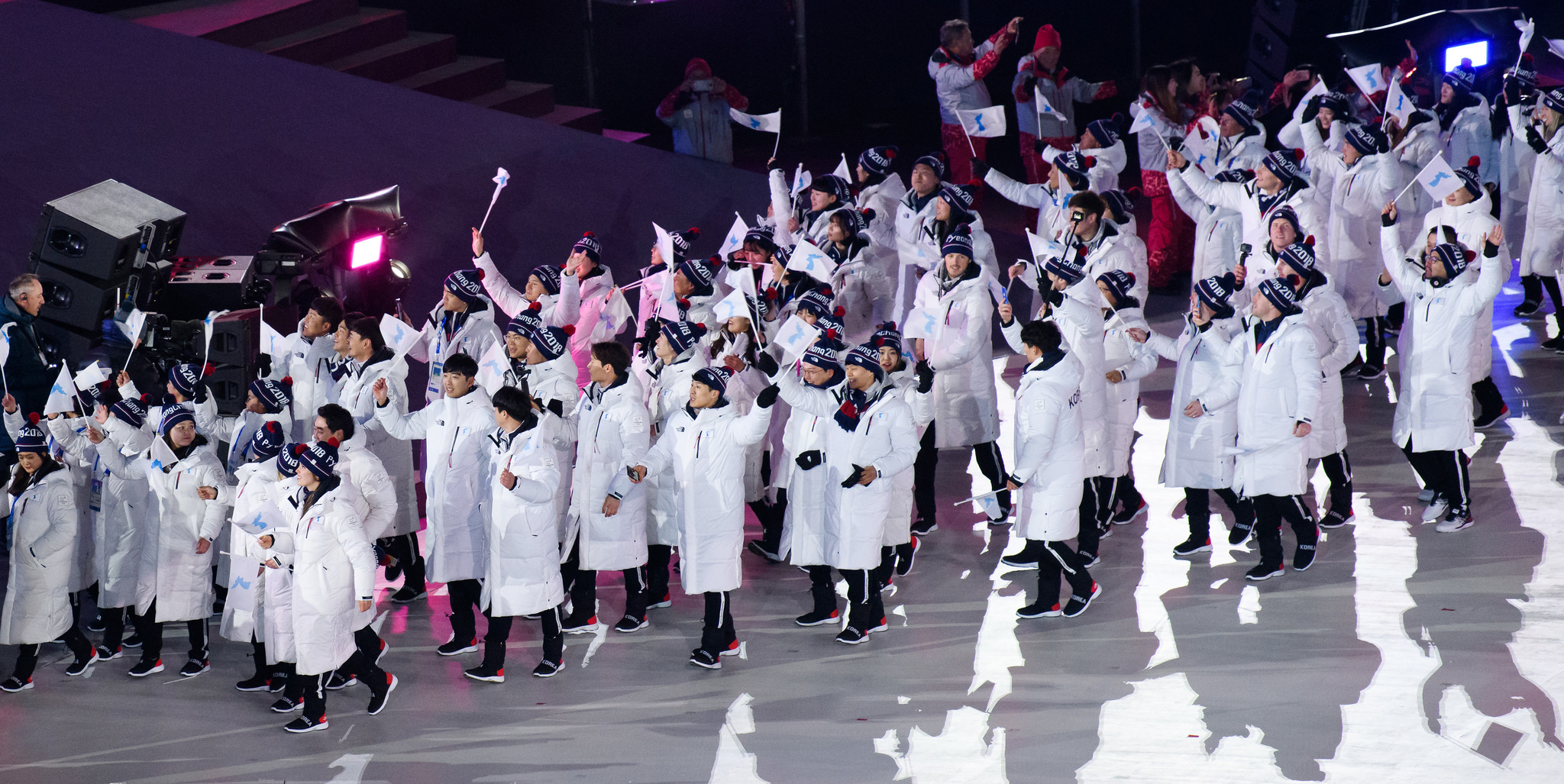
The Unified Korean delegation entering the stadium

The delegations from both the host nation South Korea and North Korea (Korea at the 2018 Winter Olympics) marched under the Korean unification flag. South Korean Won Yun-jong and North Korean Hwang Chung-gum both held the flagpole.

Despite the cold temperatures, Bermuda's delegation wore shorts and Tongan Pita Taufatofua repeated his shirtless and oiled up Summer Olympic appearance.

Background music for the parade began with an instrumental version of "Hand in Hand" by Koreana and included modern remixes of Korean songs from throughout the ages from "Short Hair" by Cho Yong-pil and "The Beauty" by Shin Jung Hyun & Yup Juns of the 1970s, as well as the following modern K-pop hits: "Gangnam Style" by Psy, "Likey" by Twice, "Fantastic Baby" by Big Bang, "DNA" by BTS, and "Red Flavor" by Red Velvet.

=== Arirang: The River of Time ===
The segment began with an older man singing "Jeongseon Arirang" as the five children rode a raft across the stage. A storm descended, however the buckwheat flowers that were being projected onto the stage remained strong, evoking the "Miracle of the Han River" and representing the resilience of Koreans.

During the segment, an intruder entered the stage, standing behind the singer before being escorted away by security.

=== All for the Future ===
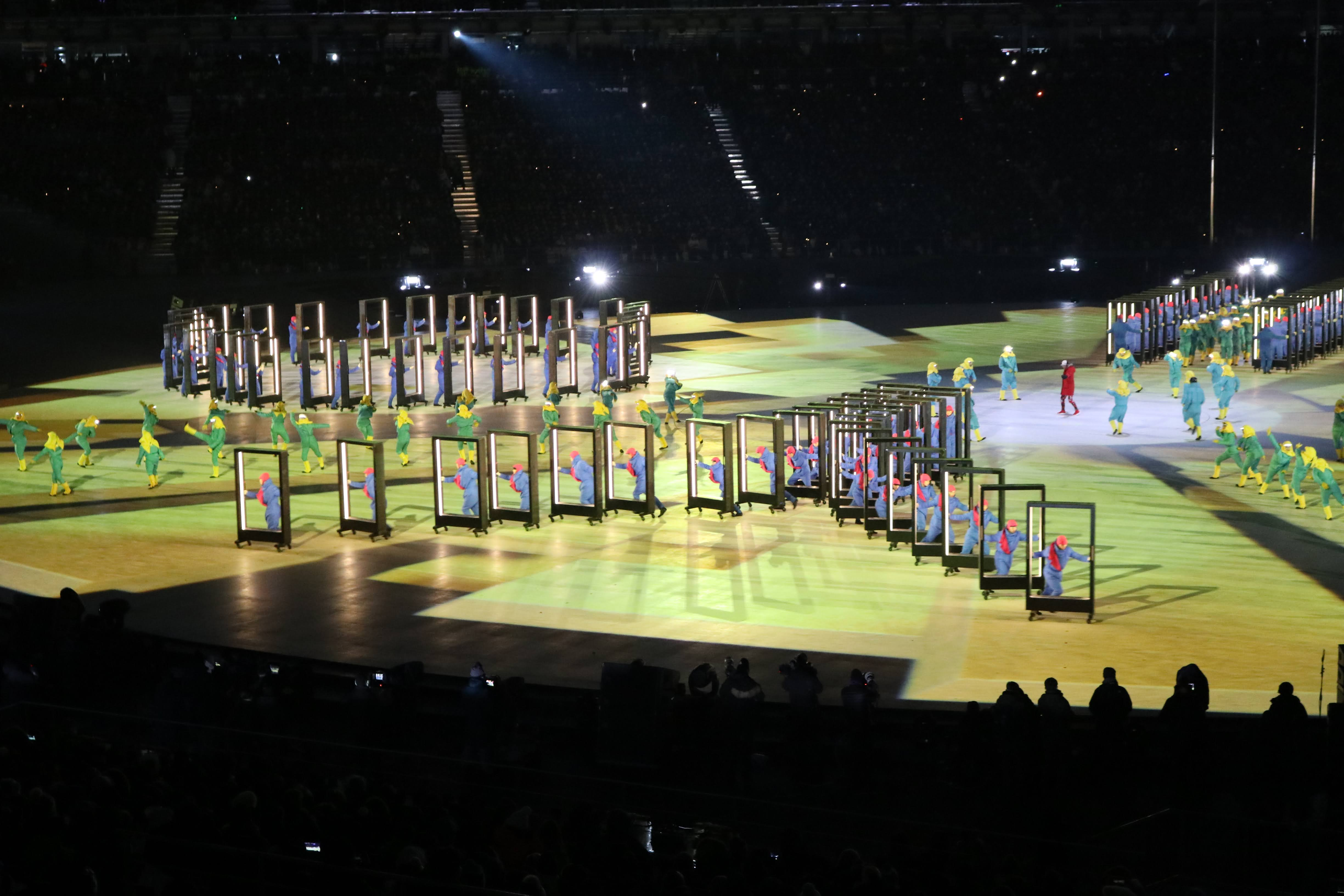
Performers interacting with the "Gate to the Future" on stage

A video depicting the dreams and futures of the five children opened the segment. Back in the stadium, performers handling "Gates to the Future" performed a choreography invoking South Korea's status as an IT powerhouse, as well as the Fourth Industrial Revolution.

The segment culminated with the raising of the Media Link in the center of the stage, and the word "future" projected onto it in different languages.

=== Opening Speeches ===
Lee Hee-beom, President & CEO of the PyeongChang Organizing Committee for the 2018 Olympic & Paralympic Winter Games made an opening welcome speech to the athletes of the world in Korean. This was followed by Thomas Bach, IOC President who made an address as well. Bach then invited the President of the Republic of Korea Moon Jae-in to declare open the XXIII Olympic Winter Games in PyeongChang in Korean.

"제23회 동계올림픽대회인 평창동계올림픽대회의 개회를 선언합니다." - "I declare the opening of the XXIII Winter Olympic Games, the PyeongChang Winter Olympic Games."

— Moon Jae-in, President of the Republic of Korea

=== Peace in Motion ===
The five children were joined by families from across Gangwon Province, who one by one, lit each other's candles. During this, four Korean singers - Ha Hyun-woo of the band Guckkasten, Ahn Ji-young of the musical duo Bolbbalgan4, Lee Eun-mi and Jeon In-kwon with his band Deulgukhwa performed John Lennon's Imagine, with the feed occasionally cutting to footage of street musicians from across the world having joined in the performance.

At the conclusion of the song, the five children released a dove shaped balloon, and the feed again transitioned to a prerecorded video. The video depicted snowboarders descending Alpensia, and the formation of the Olympic Rings by 1,218 drones, a world record at the time.

The drones would later be used during the victory ceremonies, cultural performances, and the closing ceremony.

=== The Olympic Flag, Anthem, and Oaths ===
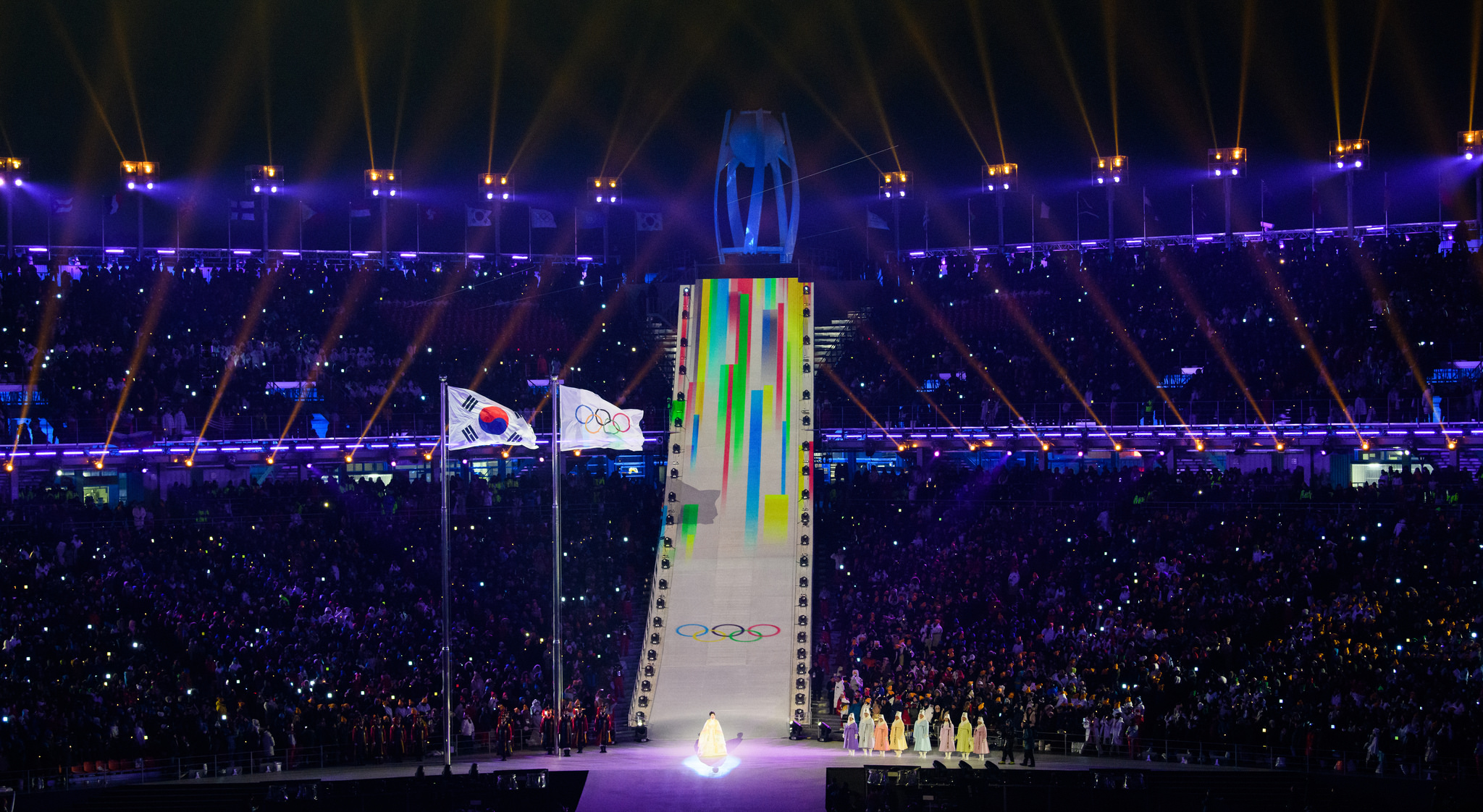
The Olympic Anthem being performed as the Olympic Flag is raised

Eight flagbearers consisting of Olympic medalists and young athletes brought the Olympic Flag into the stadium. The flag was then raised as Hwang Su-mi performed the Olympic Anthem.

The Olympic Oaths were then taken.

=== Lighting of the Olympic Flame ===
Following a short montage recapping the torch relay, the Olympic torch was carried into the stadium by Chun Lee-kyung, four time Olympic champion in short-track speed skating. She passed the torch to Park Inbee, Olympic champion in golf. She in turn passed it to Ahn Jung-hwan, a football player notable for representing South Korea at the 2002 FIFA World Cup. He passed it to Jong Su-hyon from North Korea and Park Jong-ah from South Korea, both representing the unified Korean ice hockey team, who carried the torch and headed up stairs toward the cauldron.

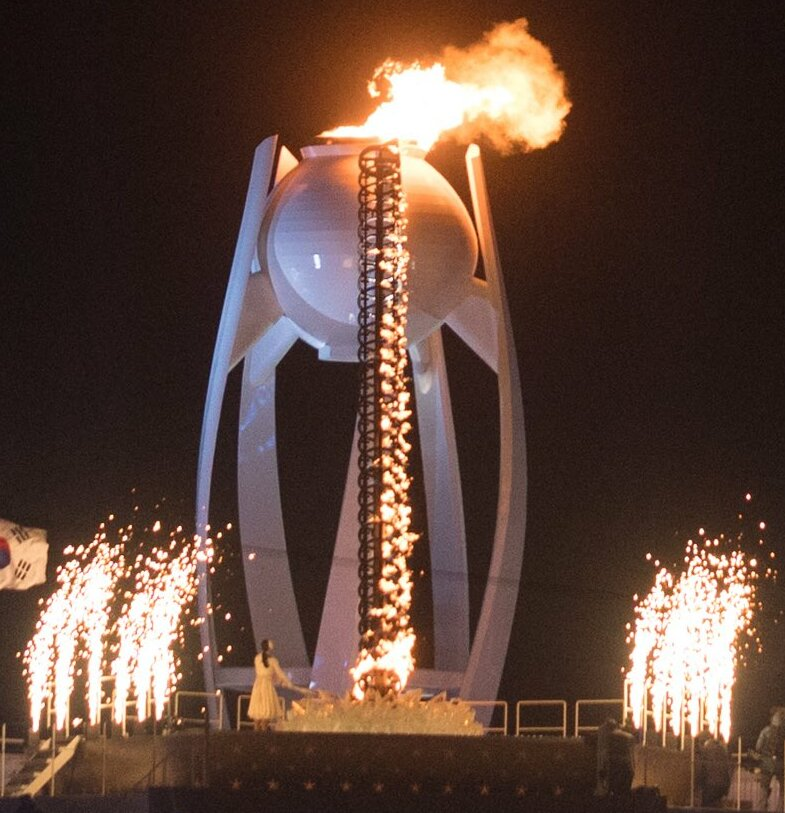
The Olympic Cauldron being lit by Yuna Kim

As the torch neared the cauldron, an ice skating rink with South Korean figure skater Yuna Kim was revealed. Yuna Kim is the well-known figure skater who won gold medal in 2010 and silver medal in 2014. The cauldron was designed to represent a full moon when it is not lit. Kim received the torch and lit the cauldron.

=== Wish Fire ===
The final segment featured Korean dance group Just Jerk (who became known internationally for their participation in the twelfth season of America's Got Talent), dressed as Dokkaebi; and performers with sparklers on roller blades. This segment in total featured 2,000 fireworks within and out of the stadium, some reaching as high as 1,300 metres (4,300 ft).

== Hacking of computer systems ==
On 24 February, The Washington Post reported that U.S. intelligence uncovered Russian spies hacked computers during the Opening Ceremony. Analysts believed the Russians instigated 9 February attack as a way to retaliate for the International Olympic Committee's decision to restrict the participation of Russian athletes in the 2018 Winter Olympics as punishment for doping violations.

Sandworm, a Russian cybermilitary unit of the GRU, is believed to be responsible for the attack. The worm used is known as "Olympic Destroyer". It targeted all Olympic IT infrastructure, and succeeded in taking down WiFi, feeds to jumbotrons, ticketing systems, and other Olympic systems. It was timed to go off at the start of the opening ceremonies. It was unique in that the hackers attempted to use many false signatures to blame other countries such as North Korea and China.

== Dignitaries in attendance ==
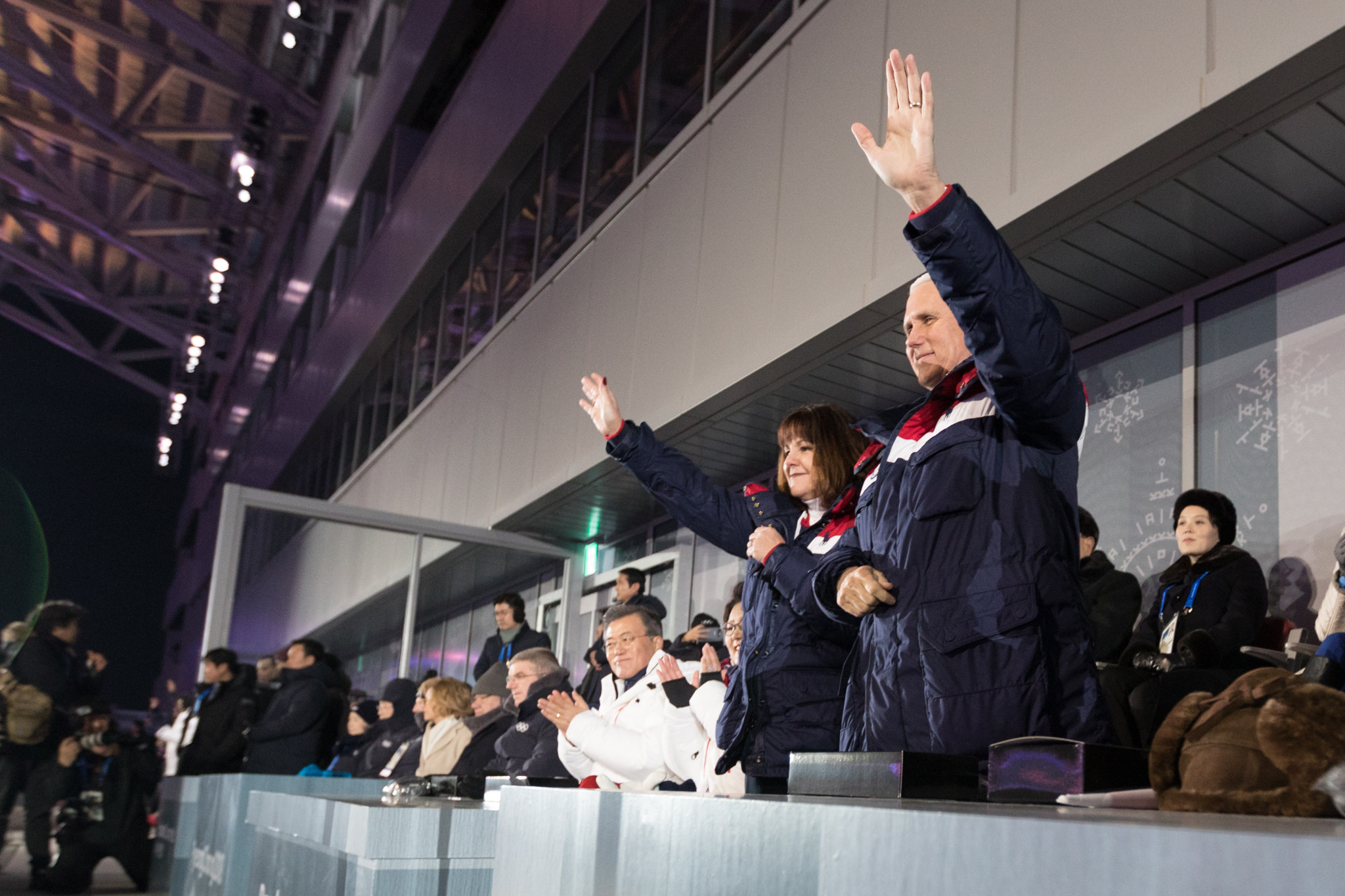
Mike Pence, Vice President of the United States with Moon Jae-in of South Korea, Thomas Bach of the IOC and Kim Yo Jong of North Korea

About 25 heads of state attended the ceremony, in addition to the UN Secretary General. President of Russia Vladimir Putin was invited to attend, but declined due to the symbolic ban on Russia by the IOC.

=== Dignitaries from International organizations ===
- United Nations –
  - Secretary-General António Guterres
  - Former Secretary-General Ban Ki-moon
- Vatican City –
  - Under-secretary of Pontifical Council for Culture Melchor Sanchez de Toca
- International Olympic Committee –
  - IOC President Thomas Bach and wife Claudia Bach
  - IOC Members

=== Host country dignitaries ===
- South Korea –
  - President of the Republic of Korea Moon Jae-in
  - First Lady of the Republic of Korea Kim Jung-sook
  - President & CEO of the PyeongChang Organizing Committee for the 2018 Olympic & Paralympic Winter Games Lee Hee-beom
  - Former President Lee Myung-bak

=== Dignitaries from abroad ===
- Canada –
  - Governor General Julie Payette
- China –
  - Politburo standing member and Vice Premier Han Zheng
- Colombia –
  - Vice President Óscar Naranjo
- Czech Republic –
  - President of the Senate Milan Stech
- Denmark –
  - Crown Prince Frederik (representing the Queen of Denmark)
- Estonia –
  - President Kersti Kaljulaid
- Finland –
  - Prime Minister Juha Sipilä
- France –
  - President Emmanuel Macron
  - Minister of Europe and Foreign Affairs Jean-Yves Le Drian
  - Minister of Sports Laura Flessel
- Germany –
  - President Frank-Walter Steinmeier
- Italy –
  - Sports Minister of Italy Luca Lotti
- Japan –
  - Prime Minister Shinzo Abe
- Kosovo –
  - President Hashim Thaçi
- Latvia –
  - President Andris Berzins
- Lithuania –
  - President Dalia Grybauskaitė
- Luxembourg –
  - Grand Duke Henri
- Malaysia –
  - Prime Minister Najib Razak
- Monaco –
  - Prince Albert II
- Netherlands –
  - King Willem Alexander
  - Queen Máxima
  - Prime Minister Mark Rutte
- Norway –
  - Prime Minister Erna Solberg
- North Korea –
  - President of the Presidium of the Supreme People's Assembly Kim Yong-nam
  - Vice Director of the Propaganda and Agitation Department of the Workers' Party of Korea Kim Yo Jong
- Poland –
  - President Andrzej Duda
- Serbia –
  - Minister of Youth and Sports Vanja Udovičić
- Slovakia –
  - President Andrej Kiska
- Slovenia –
  - President Borut Pahor
- Sweden –
  - King Carl XVI Gustaf
  - Queen Silvia
- Switzerland –
  - President Alain Berset
- (United Kingdom) Great Britain –
  - Princess Royal Anne
- United States –
  - Vice President Mike Pence
  - Second Lady Karen Pence

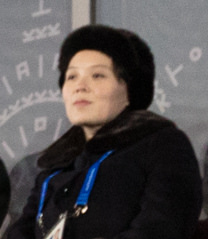
Kim Yo Jong attending the ceremony

On 9 February 2018, Kim Yo Jong—sister of Kim Jong Un—attended the ceremony in Pyeongchang, South Korea. This was a first time that a member of the ruling Kim dynasty had visited South Korea since the Korean War. Kim Yo Jong shook hands with South Korean president Moon Jae-in before sitting down to watch the ceremony together.

== Anthems ==
- Rainbow Children's Choir – National Anthem of South Korea
- Sumi Hwang – Olympic Anthem

== Ceremony key team ==
- Artistic Director: Yang Jung-woong
- Executive Director, creative: Song Seung-whan
- Executive Director, cinematography: Lim Tae-hong, Andrew
