= 2018 Winter Olympics closing ceremony =

- Part of 2018 Winter Olympics
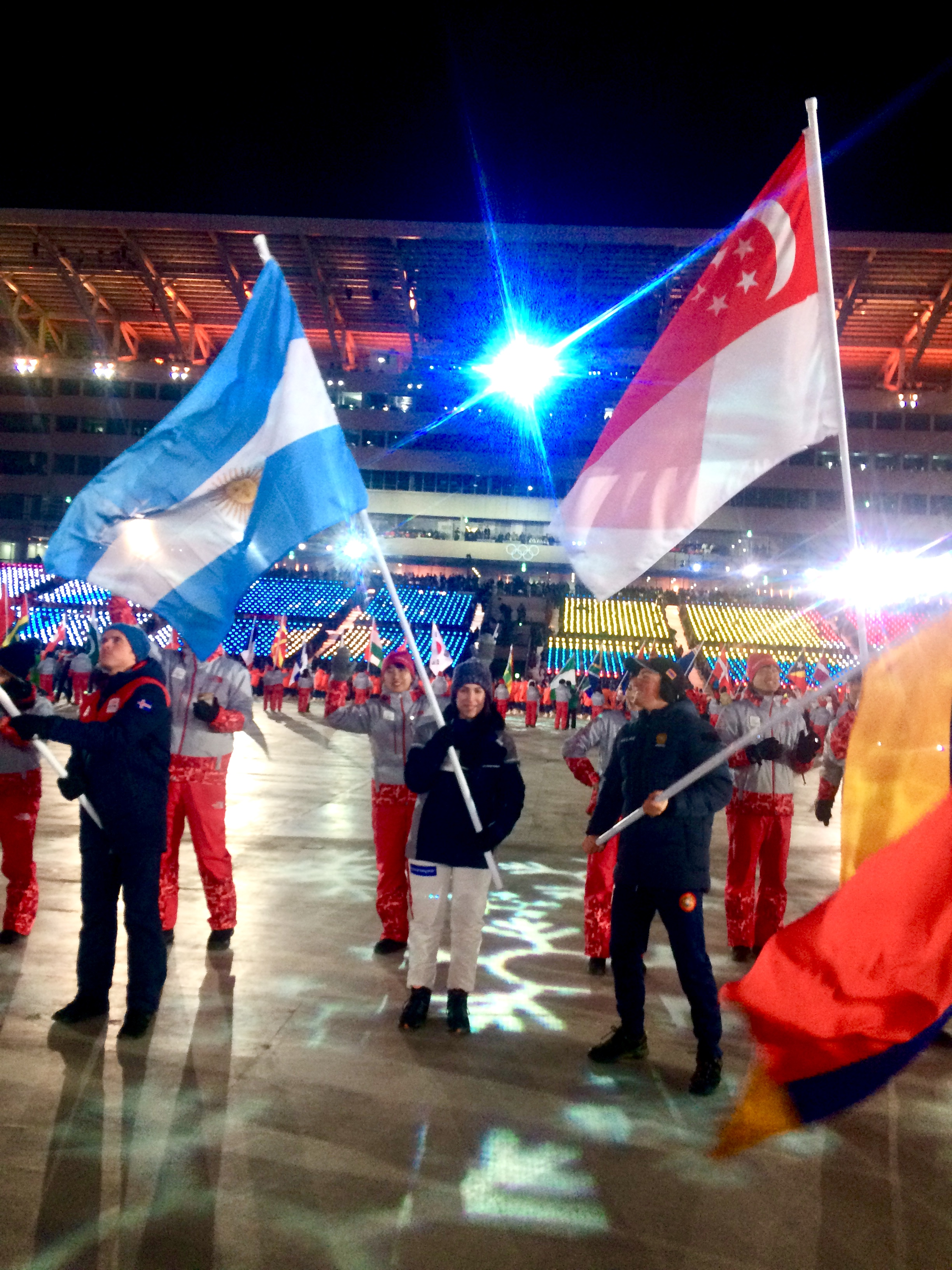
- Flagbearers at the 2018 Winter Olympics closing ceremony.
- Date: 25 February 2018; 8 years ago
- Time: 20:00–22:05 KST (UTC+9)
- Venue: Pyeongchang Olympic Stadium
- Location: Pyeongchang, South Korea
- Also known as: The Next Wave
- Filmed by: Olympic Broadcasting Services (OBS)

The closing ceremony of the 2018 Winter Olympics was held on 25 February 2018 from 20:00 to 22:05 KST (UTC+9). The ceremony took place at Pyeongchang Olympic Stadium in Pyeongchang County, South Korea.

The director of the organizing committee, Oh Jang-hwan, stated the event will have a "festival atmosphere to recognize and celebrate the athletes' hard work and achievements at the games." Combining music, dance and art, the ceremony tells the story of "The Next Wave," while emphasizing the "human spirit of perseverance."

== Proceedings ==
=== Opening ===
- 15-second countdown to the start
- South Korean singer Jang Sa-ik performed Aegukga with children from Gangwon Province.
- South Korean guitarist Yang Tae-hwan performed "Winter" of Vivaldi's Four Seasons.
- South Korean post-rock band Jambinai performed "Time of Extinction" including many geomungo players.

=== Parade of Nations ===
The flag bearers of 92 National Olympic Committees arrived into the stadium. The flag bearers from each participating country entered the stadium informally in single file, ordered by ganada order of the Korean alphabet, and behind them marched all the athletes. Marching alongside the athletes were Soohorang, the Pyeongchang 2018 Olympic mascot, and Hodori, mascot of the 1988 Summer Olympics in Seoul.

=== Concert section ===
- South Korean singer and rapper CL, leader of South Korean girl group 2NE1 (2009–2016), performed "The Baddest Female" and "I Am the Best".
- South Korean-Chinese boy group EXO performed "Growl" and "Power".
- Dutch DJ Martin Garrix headlined the afterparty segment performing "Forever", "Together", "Animals", "Like I Do", and "Pizza".

=== Handover of the Olympic flag ===
First, the Greek flag was raised while its anthem played. The Olympic flag was then lowered and passed by the mayor of Pyeongchang County, Shiim Jae-kook, to IOC President Thomas Bach, who then handed it over to the mayor of Beijing, Chen Jining. This was then followed by the raising of the flag of China, and the playing of its anthem. The flag was raised again in Tokyo, Japan for the 2020 Summer Olympics on 23 July 2021 for the opening ceremony. (Note: The opening ceremony of the 2020 Summer Olympics was originally to start on 24 July 2020, but it would be postponed to 2021 due to the COVID-19 pandemic.)

=== See You in Beijing 2022 ===
Beijing, the host city of the 2022 Winter Olympic Games, presented a special performance See You in Beijing in 2022 directed by Chinese film director Zhang Yimou, who also presented the 2008 Summer Olympics opening and closing ceremonies. The presentation featured a modern image of China with two pandas skating and people forming red lines that became a dragon, as pandas and dragons are national icons for China. The skaters also trail lines to form the emblem of the Games. China's Paramount leader Xi Jinping made a cameo appearance by video expressing the welcome message on behalf of the Chinese people.

=== Games declared closed ===
IOC President Thomas Bach formally closed the games, calling them 'The Games of New Horizons'. Soon after, the cauldron was extinguished.

== Dignitaries in attendance ==
=== Dignitaries from International organizations ===
- International Olympic Committee –
  - President of the International Olympic Committee Thomas Bach
  - IOC Members

=== Host country dignitaries ===
- South Korea –
  - President of the Republic of Korea Moon Jae-in
  - First Lady of the Republic of Korea Kim Jung-sook
  - President & CEO of the PyeongChang Organizing Committee for the 2018 Olympic & Paralympic Winter Games Lee Hee-beom

=== Dignitaries from abroad ===
- North Korea –
  - Supreme People's Assembly Presidium member Kim Yong-chol
- China –
  - Vice Premier of the People's Republic of China Liu Yandong
- United States –
  - Advisor to the President Ivanka Trump
  - U.S. Senator Jim Risch
  - Press Secretary Sarah Huckabee Sanders
  - General Vincent K. Brooks
  - Chargé d'Affaires ad interim of South Korea Marc Knapper
  - Former Winter Olympian, current Team USA Coach, Shauna Rohbock

== Anthems ==
- Jang Sa-ik and a choir of local schoolchildren - National Anthem of South Korea
- London Symphony Orchestra (2012 recording) - National Anthem of Greece
- (International Olympic Committee) Oh Yeon-joon - Olympic Anthem (English version)
- A choir of singers from the 56 ethnic groups of China - National Anthem of the People's Republic of China

=== Victory ceremonies ===
- National Anthem of Finland (Note: Anthem played as part of the Men's 50km mass start classical victory ceremony.)
- National Anthem of Norway (Note: Anthem played as part of the Women's 30km mass start classical victory ceremony.)
