= Olympic Organizing Committee =

Olympic Organizing Committee or the Organizing Committee of the Olympics (or alternatively Olympic Organising Committee or the Organising Committee of the Olympics) may refer to:

- Athens Organizing Committee for the Olympic Games
- Beijing Organizing Committee for the Olympic Games, 2008
- Beijing Organizing Committee for the 2022 Olympic and Paralympic Winter Games, 2022
- Lillehammer Olympic Organizing Committee
- London Organising Committee of the Olympic and Paralympic Games
- Nagano Olympic Organizing Committee
- Paris Organising Committee for the 2024 Olympic and Paralympic Games
- PyeongChang Organizing Committee for the 2018 Olympic & Paralympic Winter Games
- Rio 2016 Organising Committee for the Olympic and Paralympic Games
- Salt Lake Organizing Committee for the Olympic and Paralympic Winter Games of 2002
- Seoul Olympic Organizing Committee
- Sochi 2014 Olympic and Paralympic Organizing Committee
- Tokyo Organising Committee of the Olympic and Paralympic Games
- Vancouver Organizing Committee for the 2010 Olympic and Paralympic Winter Games

== See also ==
- International Olympic Committee
  - List of IOC country codes
- President of the Organising Committee for the Olympic Games
