= Kim Jin-sun =

South Korean politician (born 1946)

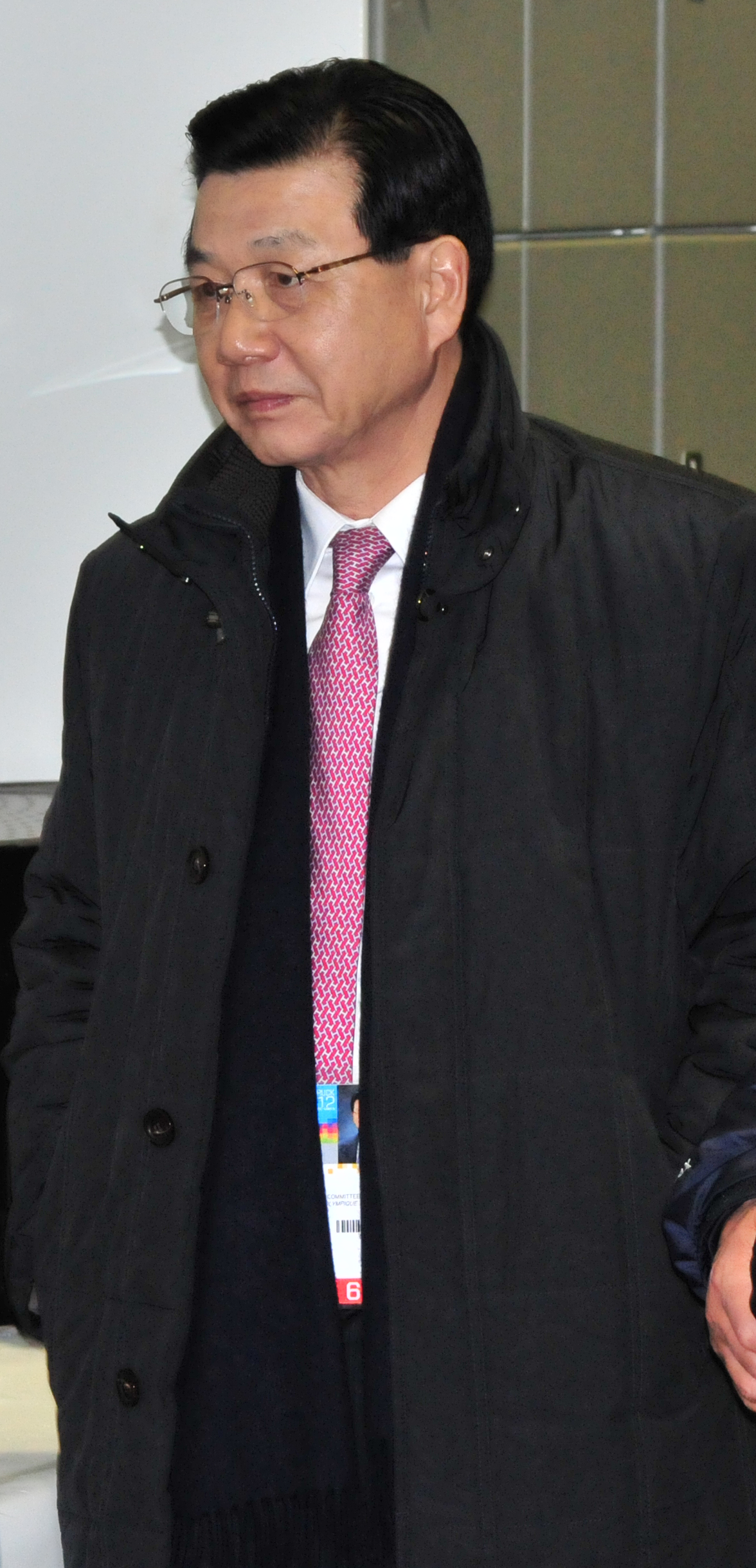
- At 2012 Winter Youth Olympics

Governor of Gangwon Province
- In office July 1, 1998 – June 30, 2010
- Preceded by: Choi Gag-gyu
- Succeeded by: Lee Kwang-jae

President of the PyeongChang Organizing Committee for the 2018 Olympic & Paralympic Winter Games
- In office October 19, 2011 – July 21, 2014
- Leader: Jacques Rogge (2011–2013); Thomas Bach (2013–2014)
- Preceded by: Dmitry Chernyshenko
- Succeeded by: Cho Yang-ho

Chair of the PyeongChang Organizing Committee for the 2018 Olympic & Paralympic Winter Games
- In office October 19, 2011 – July 21, 2014; Chair of the PyeongChang bid: September 14, 2009 – October 5, 2011
- Preceded by: Committee established
- Succeeded by: Cho Yang-ho

Personal details
- Born: November 10, 1946 (age 79) Gangwon Province, southern Korea
- Party: Grand National
- Education: Bachelor of Public Administration, Dongguk University

Korean name
- Hangul: 김진선
- Hanja: 金振兟
- RR: Gim Jinseon
- MR: Kim Chinsŏn

Kim Jin-sun (Korean: 김진선; born November 10, 1946) is a former governor of Gangwon Province, South Korea, and former president of the Pyeongchang 2018 Olympic Organizing Committee for the 2018 Winter Olympics which was held in Pyeongchang, South Korea.

He resigned from the top post of the POCOG in July 2014 only nine months after being reelected, although his current temp should have expired as late as in October 2015.

== Election results ==
=== General elections ===
Year	Elections	Constituency	Political party	Votes (%)	Results
2016	20th National Assembly General Election	Taebaek–Hoengseong–Yeongwol–Pyeongchang–Jeongseon (Gangwon)	Independent	42,832 (39.49%)	Defeated (2nd)

=== Local elections ===
==== Governor of Gangwon ====
Year	Elections	Constituency	Political party	Votes (%)	Remarks
1998	2nd Iocal Election	Gangwon (Governoral Elections)	GNP	268,559 (39.37%)	Won
2002	3rd Iocal Election	Gangwon (Governoral Elections)	GNP	468,987 (71.11%)	Won
2006	4th Iocal Election	Gangwon (Governoral Elections)	GNP	471,613 (71.06%)	Won

Preceded by None	President of Organizing Committee for 2018 Winter Olympics; 2012–2015	Succeeded by (South Korea) Cho Yang-ho
