= Walter Cho =

South Korean businessman

- Cho Won-tae
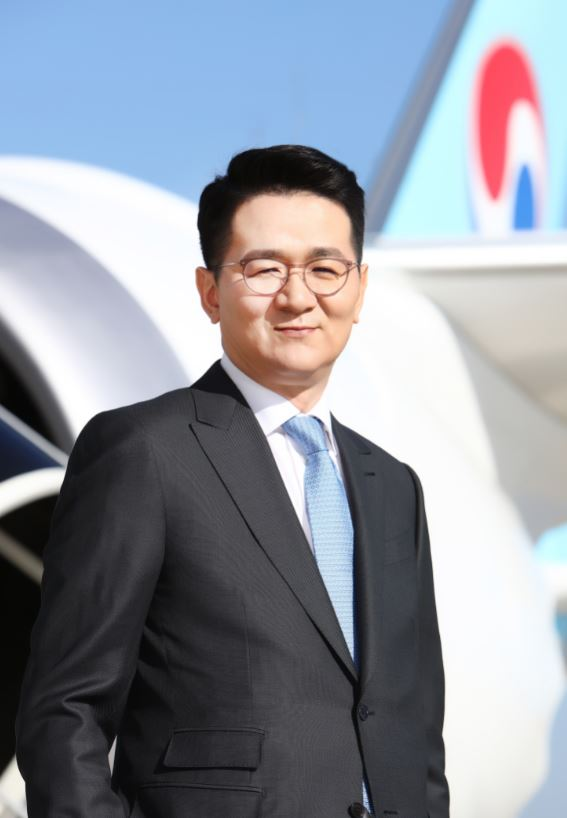
- Born: 25 January 1976 (age 50); Seoul, South Korea
- Education: University of Southern California
- Employer: Hanjin Group
- Parent(s): Cho Yang-ho and Lee Myung-hee

Korean name
- Hangul: 조원태
- Hanja: 趙源泰
- RR: Jo Wontae
- MR: Cho Wŏnt'ae

Cho Won-tae (born 25 January 1976), also known as Walter Cho, is a South Korean businessman. Walter Cho is the chairman and chief executive officer of Hanjin Group and Korean Air. He is a member of the International Air Transport Association (IATA) board of governors and chairman of the SkyTeam Alliance Board.

== Early life ==
Cho was born in Seoul on 25 January 1976. He is the son of former Hanjin Group chairman Cho Yang-ho, and the grandson of group founder Cho Choong-hoon. He has two sisters: Heather Cho and Emily Cho. Cho received his early education at Marian High School in Massachusetts. He attended a two-year college in the United States before transferring to Inha University in South Korea in 1998. He later completed an MBA from the University of Southern California in Los Angeles. For his mandatory military service, he completed alternative service under the Skilled Industrial Personnel program.

== Career ==
=== Early career ===
Cho joined Hanjin Group, the parent company of Korean Air, in 2003. He became the vice-president of Hanjin Information Systems & Telecommunication, and then in 2004 was transferred to Korean Air, where he became the vice-manager of the planning team within the operations and strategy department. He was promoted to head of the procurement department in January 2006, and then to assistant director in December of that year. He received a further promotion in December 2007. He later became the chief operating officer of Korean Air. In 2015, the aftermath of his sister Heather's resignation over the nut rage incident, he took over management responsibility for other areas of Korean Air's business which she had previously overseen, including hotels and catering, in what was widely seen as a confirmation that he would inherit control of the company. He was named the company's president in January 2017. Cho concurrently held a number of other posts at Hanjin Group affiliates, including Hanjin Kal, Jin Air, Uniconverse, and the aircraft ground handling company Korea Airport Service, but resigned from those positions in 2017, in a move which Korean Air stated would improve management efficiency within the company.

=== As CEO ===
He became chairman and CEO of Hanjin and Korean Air in April 2019 following the death of his father. Cho was elected as a member of the International Air Transport Association (IATA) Board of Governors at the 2019 IATA General Assembly, which was organized in Seoul in June. He was also elected as chairman of the Skyteam Alliance board in June 2019.

In 17 December 2020, Cho received the "médaille d'honneur des affaires étrangères de la France" for his active participation for the repatriation of French citizens from South-Korea to France during the COVID-19 crises by using Korean Air.

Cho has been widely recognized for successfully navigating the COVID-19 pandemic. He led Korean Air to pivot to its cargo operations when passenger operations nearly came to a halt due to COVID restrictions; the airline operated cargo-only flights on passenger routes and converted some passenger jets into freighters. These efforts helped the airline to achieve an operating profit throughout the pandemic, and a record-high operating profit and net profit in 2021. Korean Air was named both 2021 Airline of the Year and 2022 Cargo Operator of the Year by Air Transport World. The airline was also recognized as AirlineRatings.com's 2022 Cargo Airline of the Year and ranked fourth in their top 20 airlines.

Cho remained an involved leader throughout the pandemic, volunteering to join a repatriation flight to Wuhan, the epicenter of the pandemic, to support the cabin crew soon after the COVID outbreak. He also joined employees and executives to manually clean and disinfect an aircraft in an event to assure the public of cabin safety amid the pandemic.

== Awards ==
- 2020: Médaille d'honneur des affaires étrangères de la France (Honour medal of Foreign Affairs of France)
- 2021: Air Transport World's Airline (ATW) of the Year
- 2021: Orient Aviation's Person of the Year Award
- 2022: ATW Cargo Operator of the Year
- 2022: FlightGlobal's Air Cargo Leadership Award
- 2022: AirlineRatings.com Cargo Airline of the Year Award
- 2023: ATW Excellence in Leadership Award
- 2024: Korea Management Award, Korean Academic Society of Business Administration (KASBA)
