= Yangho =

Yangho may be,

- Cho Yangho
- the spurious Yangho language
