= SOCOG =

SOCOG may refer to:

- Sydney Organising Committee for the Olympic Games, for the 2000 Summer Olympics
- Sochi 2014 Olympic and Paralympic Organizing Committee, for the 2014 Winter Olympics
