= Roger Rousseau =

Canadian diplomat (1921–1986)

Ambassador to the Central African Republic
- In office 1969–1972

Ambassador to Cameroon, Chad, Gabon
- In office 1970–1972

Ambassador to Dominican Republic, Venezuela
- In office 1977–1981

High Commissioner to New Zealand, Fiji, Kiribati, Tonga, Tuvalu, Western Samoa
- In office 1981–1985

President and CEO of the Montreal Olympic Organizing Committee
- In office 11 September 1972 – 1 August 1976
- IOC President: Lord Killanin
- Preceded by: Willi Daume
- Succeeded by: Ignati Novikov (Official Representative)

Chair of the Montreal Olympic Organizing Committee
- In office 20 March 1972 – 1978
- Preceded by: Committee established
- Succeeded by: Position dissolved

Personal details
- Born: Charles Odilon Roger Rousseau; 6 February 1921 Trois-Pistoles, Quebec
- Died: 26 September 1986 (aged 65) Ottawa, Ontario

Charles Odilon Roger Rousseau, CC (6 February 1921 – 26 September 1986) was a Canadian ambassador, administrator and soldier. He was head of the Montreal Olympic Organizing Committee (COJO) for the 1976 Summer Olympics in Montreal.

He served in the Royal Canadian Air Force during World War II, but became a prisoner of war in 1942 until the war's end.

He was born in Trois-Pistoles, Quebec and died of cancer in Ottawa, Ontario.

== Diplomatic posts ==
- 1969–1972: Ambassador to the Central African Republic
- 1970–1972: Ambassador to Chad, Gabon, and Cameroon
- 1977–1981: Ambassador to the Dominican Republic and Venezuela
- 1981–1985: High Commissioner to New Zealand, Fiji, Kiribati, Tonga, Tuvalu, and Western Samoa

Sporting positions
Preceded by (West Germany) Willi Daume	President of Organizing Committee for Summer Olympic Games; 1976	Succeeded by (Soviet Union) Ignati Novikov
