= Dmitry Chernyshenko =

Russian businessman and politician

- Дмитрий Чернышенко
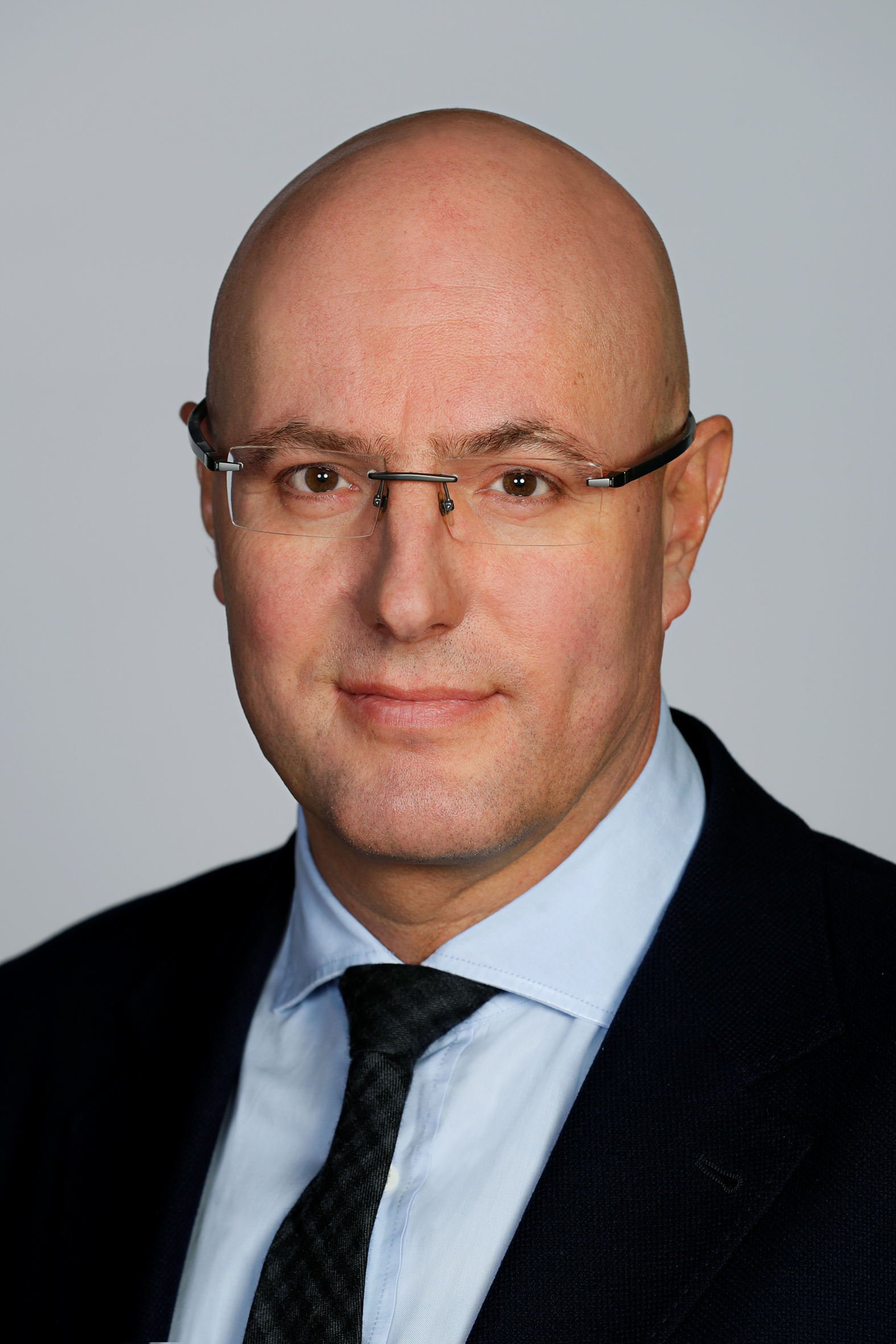
- Official portrait, 2020

Deputy Prime Minister of Russia for Tourism, Sport, Culture and Communications
- Incumbent
- Assumed office 21 January 2020
- Prime Minister: Mikhail Mishustin
- Preceded by: Olga Golodets

President & of the Sochi 2014 Olympic and Paralympic Organizing Committee
- In office 28 February 2010 – 23 February 2014
- IOC President: Jacques Rogge (2010–13); Thomas Bach (2013–14)
- Preceded by: John Furlong
- Succeeded by: Cho Yang-ho

Chair of the Sochi 2014 Olympic and Paralympic Organizing Committee
- In office 2 October 2007 – 2 August 2015
- Preceded by: Committee established
- Succeeded by: Position dissolved

Personal details
- Born: 20 September 1968 (age 58) Saratov, Russian SFSR, Soviet Union (now Russia)
- Education: STANKIN

Dmitry Nikolayevich Chernyshenko (Russian: Дмитрий Николаевич Чернышенко; born 20 September 1968) is a Russian businessman and politician serving as Deputy Prime Minister of Russia for Tourism, Sport, Culture and Communications since 2020. Previously, he was the President of the Sochi 2014 Olympic Organizing Committee for the 2014 Winter Olympics which were held in Sochi, Russia.

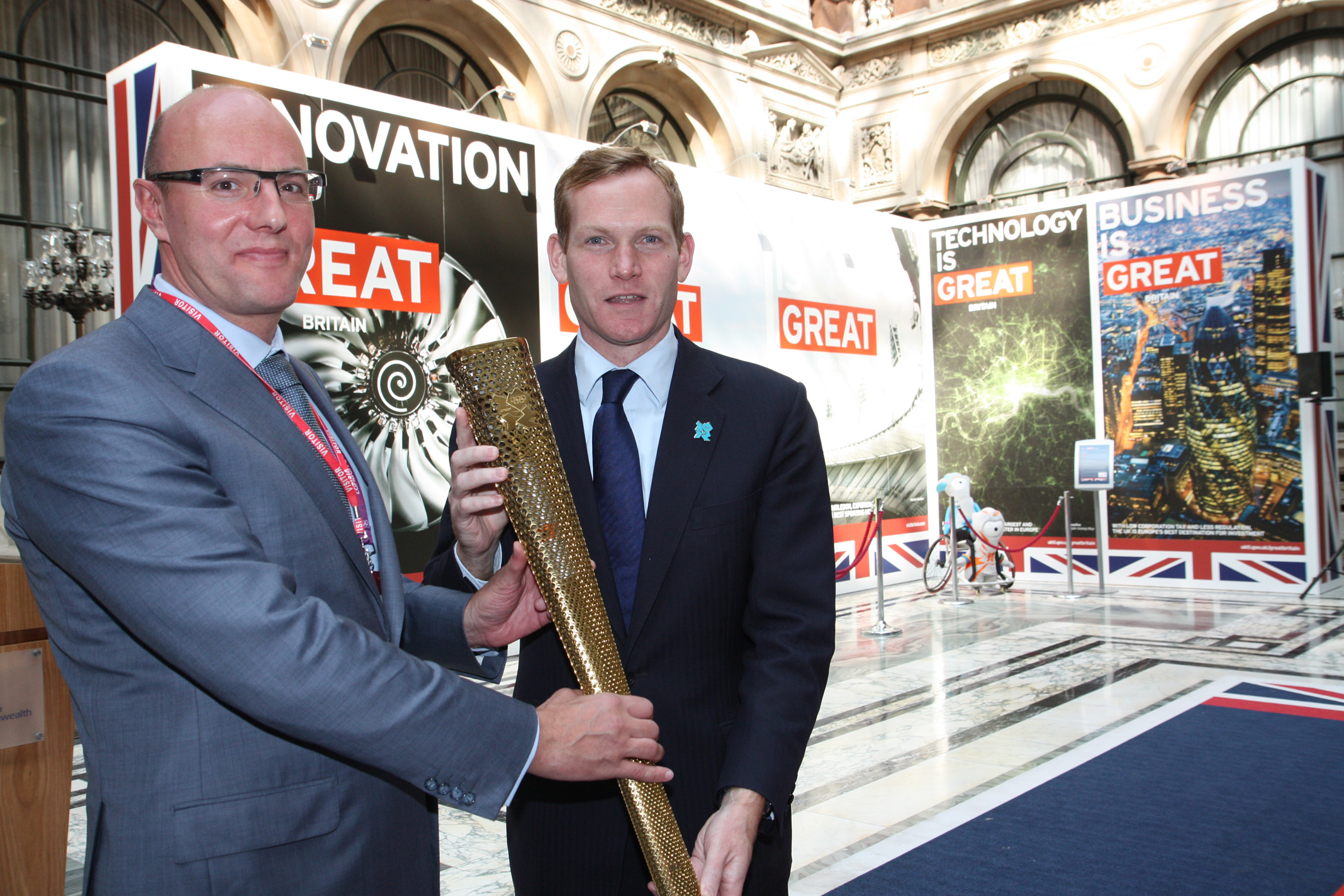
Chernyshenko with Foreign Office Minister Jeremy Browne, 9 August 2012

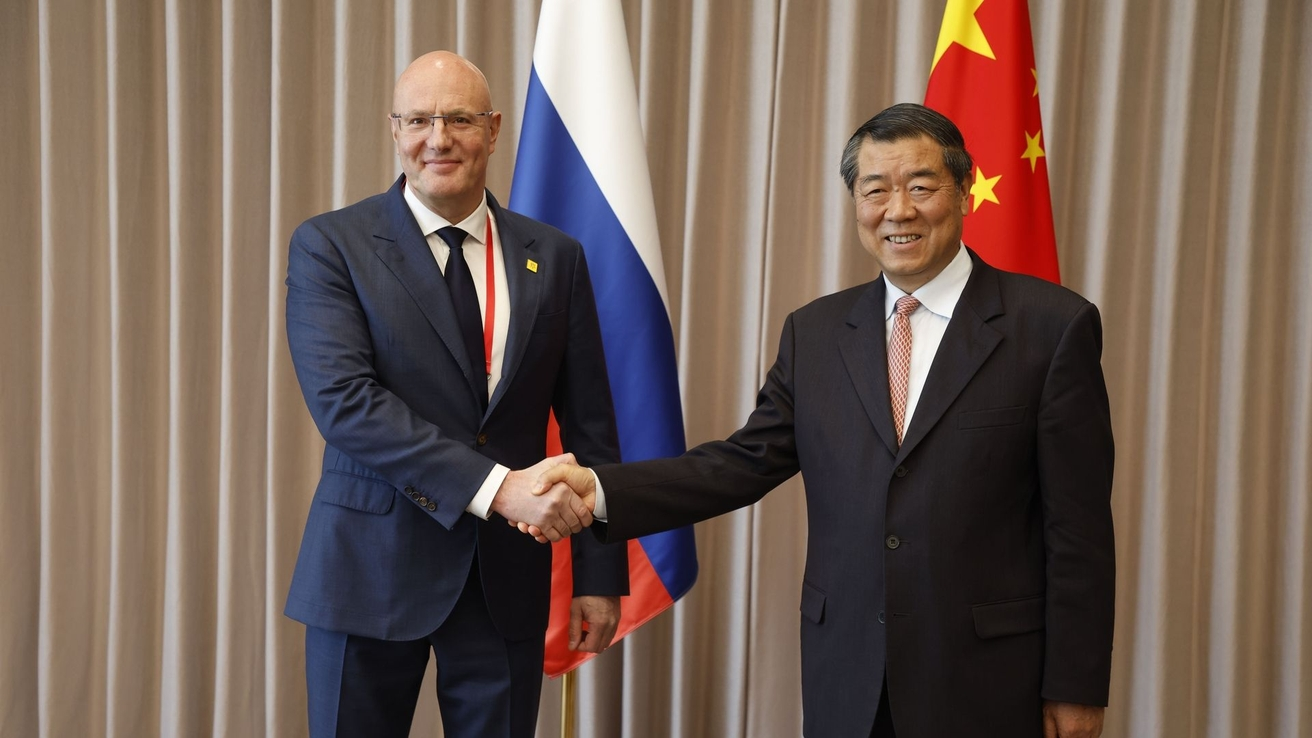
Chernyshenko with Chinese Vice Premier He Lifeng, 23 May 2023

== Sporting activities ==
Since 27 November 2014, Chernyshenko has been the President of the Kontinental Hockey League, replacing Alexander Medvedev. In addition, he was appointed Board Chairman of Gazprom-Media in December 2014. Chernyshenko is also member of the Supervisory Board of Sberbank of Russia (2020–21).

He was removed from the IOC Coordination Commission Beijing 2022 by the International Olympic Committee, due to his involvement in the Russian doping scandal.

== Awards and honours ==
In 2014, Chernyshenko was awarded the Olympic Order and the Paralympic Order. He was stripped of the orders, however, on 28 February and 2 March 2022, respectively, due to Russia's invasion of Ukraine. Chernyshenko responded by saying: "Our country has always adhered to the principle that sport is beyond politics, but we are constantly drawn into the politics, because they understand the importance of sport in the lives of our Russian people." In 2023, he further criticized the West at the Russian sports forum:

We have a lot of international competitions this year, despite the fact that countries that are unfriendly to us are trying to exclude us from the system of world sports.

But nothing works out for them, we see that the “Friendship Games” and the All-Russian Spartakiad, “Games of the Future”, “Children of Asia” and many other competitions are held, no matter what.

Countries come, some, however, with apprehension, because they are afraid of [Western] sanctions. But we know that time will put everything in its place, we know that not a single international competition is complete without our [Russian] athletes.

We saw how, at the tune of the Anglo-Saxons, all international organizations, starting with the IOC (International Olympic Committee), began to put obstacles for the participation of our athletes in international sports competitions, and they continue to do so.

In 2019, Chernyshenko entered Variety magazine's list of the 500 most influential business leaders in the media industry for a second year in a row.

== Sanctions ==
In 2022, Chernyshenko was sanctioned by the European Union, the United Kingdom, and the United States due to the Russo-Ukrainian War. In January 2023, he was sanctioned by Japan.

Preceded by (Canada) John Furlong	President of Organizing Committee for Winter Olympic Games; 2014	Succeeded by (South Korea) Cho Yang-ho
