= Hanjin =

South Korean conglomerate

Hanjin KAL Corporation

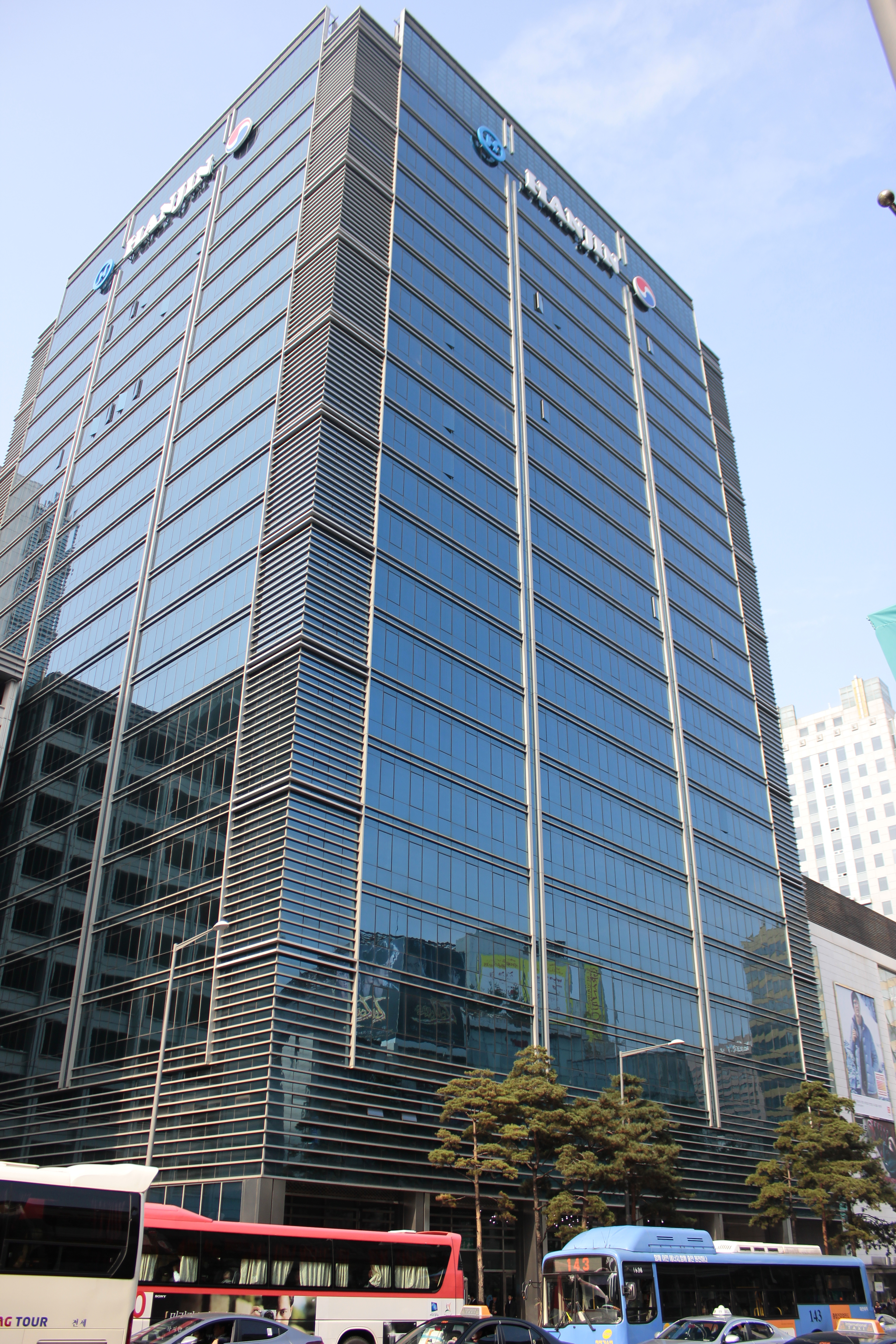
- Headquarters
- Native name: 한진칼
- Type: Public
- Traded as: KRX: 180640
- Industry: Conglomerate
- Founded: November 1945; 81 years ago
- Founder: Cho Choong-hoon
- Headquarters: Seoul, South Korea
- Key people: Walter Cho (chairman and CEO); Ryu Kyeong-Pyo (president)
- Owner: Hoban Group (18.46%); Delta Air Lines (14.90%); Korea Development Bank (10.58%); Estate of Walter Cho (5.78%); Estate of Emily Lee Cho (5.73%); others
- Subsidiaries: Korean Air, Jin Air
- Website: hanjinkal.co.kr

The Hanjin Group (Korean: 한진 그룹; Hanja: 韓進 그룹; RR: Hanjin Geurup) is a South Korean chaebol. The group has various industries covered from transportation and airlines to hotels, tourism, and airport businesses, and is one of the largest chaebols in Korea. The group includes Korean Air (KAL), which was acquired by the founder Cho Choong-hoon in 1969, and was the owner of Hanjin Shipping (once the largest shipping company in Korea) before its bankruptcy. In 2013, Hanjin Group officially switched from cross ownership to a holding company structure with the establishment of Hanjin KAL Corporation. The group is controlled by descendants of Cho Choong-hoon, and many construction chaebols are the major shareholders of Hanjin KAL.

== History ==
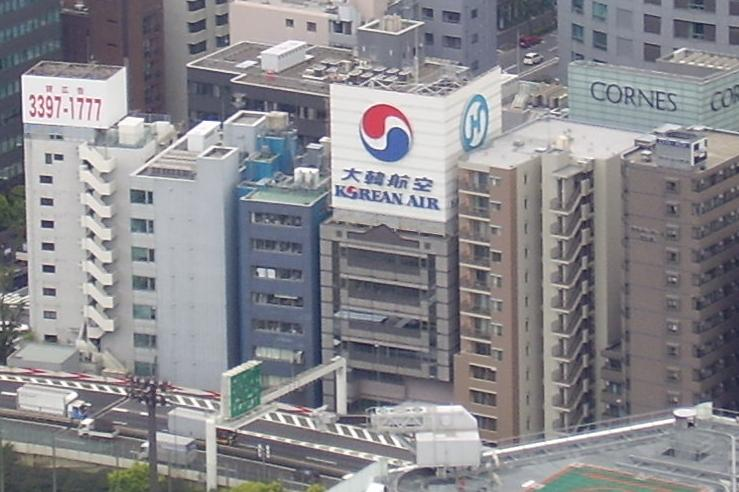
Korean Air/Hanjin Office in Minato, Tokyo, Japan as seen from the Tokyo Tower

Hanjin started at the end of World War II, in November 1945. Early on, its biggest customer was the U.S. Army, providing the transportation of material to both Korea and Vietnam. The company signed a major contract with the US 8th Army in November 1956, and another contract in March 1966, with all of the U.S. armed forces in Vietnam, including the Army, Navy, and Air Force with cumulative profits reaching at the $150 million mark over a 5-year period [1966-1971]. In November 1969, Hanjin made its entry into the containerized shipping business signing a deal with Sea-Land Service, Inc. Hanjin during that same time period [March 1, 1969] had taken over the "loss-making" state-owned Korean Air Corporation. In September 1970, the company opened its first container yard at the port of Busan.

The late 1970s saw a major push into the Middle East with contracts signed to Kuwait at the port of Shuwaik (September 1977), Saudi Arabia at the port of Dammam (March 1979), and at the port of Jeddah (May 1980).

Former Hanjin logo, used until 23 October 2025

In March 1990, Hanjin branched out into trucking and warehousing with the purchase of Korea Freight Transport Company. In June 1992, Hanjin Express was introduced to deliver small packages and provide courier service. The company started to load and unload cargo at the ports of Long Beach and Seattle with the joint venture Total Terminals International LLC., in August 1992. In January 1993, they initiated container rail service between Busan and Uiwang. In May 1995, Hanjin hauled grain to North Korea. The Hanjin-Senator once was the seventh largest container transportation and shipping company in the world (operations ceased February 2009).

After Hanjin's founder, Cho Choong-hoon, died in 2002, his eldest son, Cho Yang-ho, inherited KAL, when his third son, Cho Soo-ho, was handed Hanjin Shipping. Cho Soo-ho died from lung cancer in 2006 and his widow, Choi Eun-young, became the chairwoman of Hanjin Shipping in the following year. KAL acquired 33.2 percent of Hanjin Shipping in June 2014.

On 31 August 2016, Hanjin Shipping filed for bankruptcy. Hanjin Shipping's creditors withdrew their support after deeming a funding plan by parent company Hanjin inadequate.

== Affiliates ==
Hanjin Group manages the basis of its holding company Hanjin-KAL which was established in August 2013.

=== Aviation ===
- Air Korea
- Incheon Aviation Technology
- Jin Air
- Korean Air
- Korea Airport Service

=== Foreign corporations ===
- Hanjin International Corporation
- Waikiki Resort Hotel

=== Ground transportation ===
- Hanjin Busan Newport Co.
- Hanjin Incheon Container Terminal Co, Ltd
- Hanjin Transportation Co, Ltd
- Seoul Integrated Freight Terminal

=== Information services ===
- CyberSky
- Global Logistics System Korea
- Hanjin Information Systems & Telecommunication
- TOPAS

=== Nonprofit corporations ===
- Il Woo Foundation
- Inha Technical College
- Inha University
- Inha University Hospital
- Jungseok Logistics Fondation
- Jungseok-Inha Educational Foundation
- Korea Aerospace University

=== Tourism, leisure, and real estate ===
- Air Total Service
- Hanjin Travel
- Jungseok Enterprise Co., Ltd
- KAL Hotel Network
- Wangsan Marina

== Other subsidiaries ==
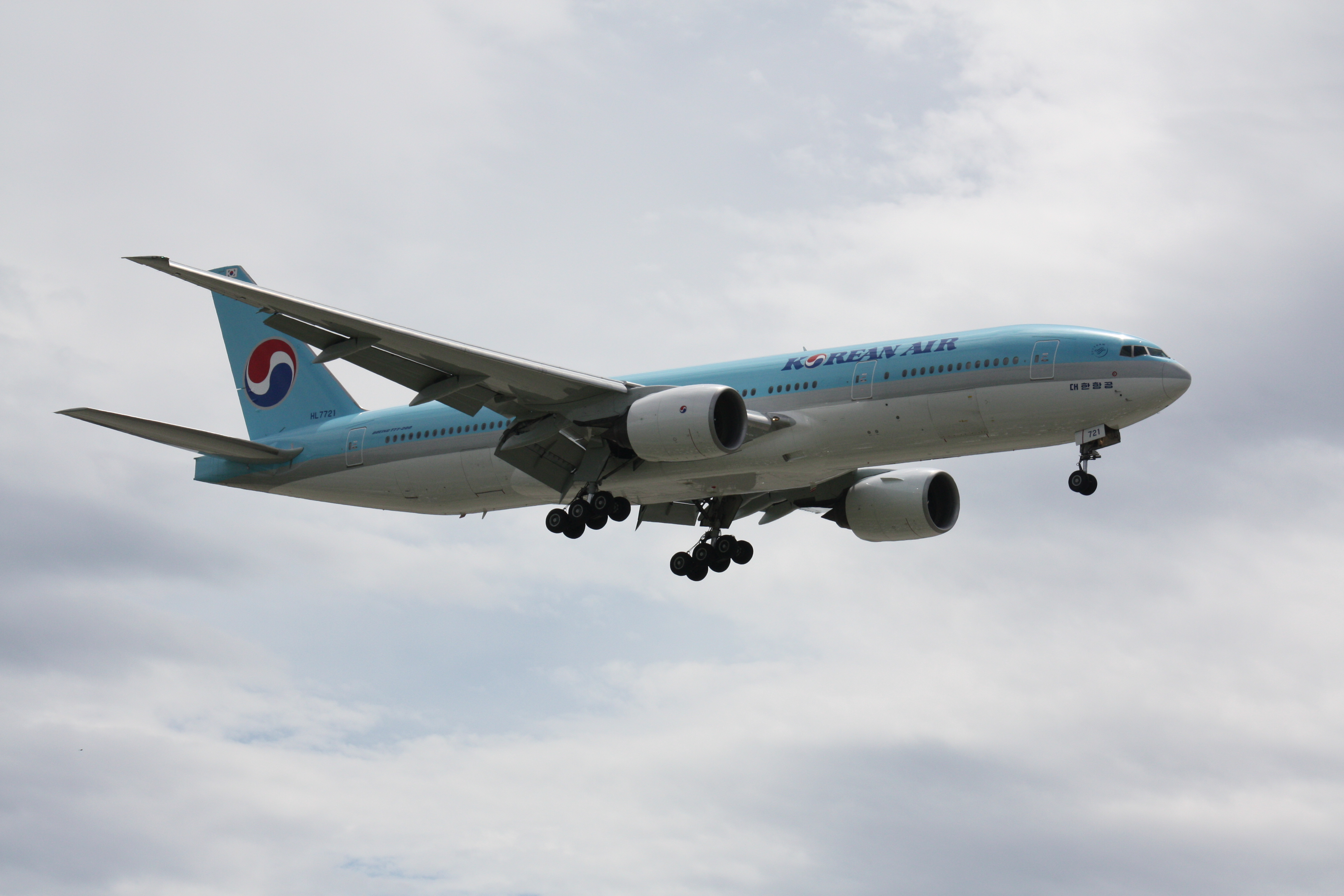
A Korean Air Boeing 777-200ER landing at Vancouver International Airport

- Homeo Therapy
- Uniconverse Co., Ltd

== Executive leadership ==
=== Pre-incorporation period ===
- Cho Joong-hoon (1945–1958)

=== Post-incorporation period ===
==== Chairman & CEO ====
- Cho Joong-hoon (1972–2002)
- Cho Yang-ho (2002–2019)
- Cho Won-tae (2019–Present)

==== Vice Chairman ====
- Kim Hyung-bae (1983–1988)
- Hwang Chang-hak (1996–2002)
- Cho Yang-ho (2002)

==== President & CEO ====
- Cho Joong-hoon (1958–1972)
- Jeon Yoon-jin (1972–1973)
- Kim Hyung-bae (1973–1983)
- Kim Geon-bae & Heo Gi (1983–1988)
- Hwang Chang-hak (1988–1996)
- Lee Tae-won (1996–2000)
- Kim In-jin (2000–2004)
- Lee Won-young (2004–2008)
- Seo Yong-won (2014–2019)
- Noh Sam-seok (2022–Present)

==== President ====
- Emily Lee Cho (2022–Present)

==== Executive Vice President ====
- Seok Tae-soo (2009–2013)
- Ryu Kyung-pyo (2019–2022)
- Noh Sam-seok (2020–2022)

==== Managing Director ====
- Seok Tae-soo (2008–2009)

== See also ==
- List of largest companies of South Korea
