= Sumi Hwang =

South Korean soprano (born 1986)

- Born: January 25, 1986 (age 40); Yecheon, North Gyeongsang
- Education: Seoul National University
- Occupation: Soprano

Sumi Hwang (Korean: 황수미; born 25 January 1986) is a South Korean soprano.

== Early life and education ==
Hwang was born in Yecheon, South Korea. She studied at the Seoul National University where she received both her bachelor's and master's degrees in music. In 2011 she moved to Europe and completed the postgraduate course at the Hochschule für Musik und Theater München.

== Career ==
Her singing talent was recognized in a church choir and she was encouraged to take singing lessons. In 2012, Hwang won second prize in the ARD International Music Competition in Munich, Germany. That year, Hwang also was award first prize at the Grandi Voci in Salzburg. In 2013, she also received first prize at the Anneliese Rothenberger Competition.

In May 2014, Sumi Hwang won the first prize in the Queen Elisabeth Competition in Belgium. Later that year, she made her United States debut at the Phillips Collection.

She joined the ensemble of Theater Bonn since September 2014.

She performed the Olympic Hymn, singing in Greek, at the opening ceremony of the 2018 Winter Olympics in Pyeongchang
