= Olympic Hymn =

Official anthem for the Olympic Games

Olympic Anthem
- Olympic Hymn
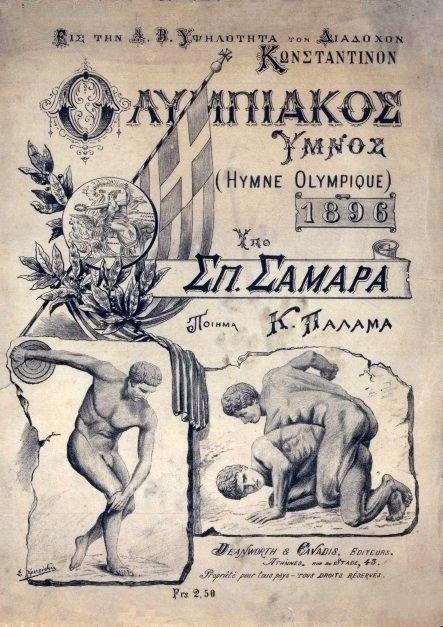
- Official anthem of the Olympic Games and the International Olympic Committee
- Also known as: Ολυμπιακός Ύμνος (Greek); Hymne Olympique (French)
- Lyrics: Kostis Palamas
- Music: Spyridon Samaras, 1896
- Adopted: 1958

The Olympic Hymn (Greek: Ολυμπιακός Ύμνος, pronounced [oli(m)bi̯aˈkos ˈimnos]), also known as the Olympic Anthem, is a choral cantata by opera composer Spyridon Samaras (1861–1917), with Demotic Greek lyrics by Greek poet Kostis Palamas. Both poet and composer were the choice of the Greek Demetrius Vikelas, who was the first President of the International Olympic Committee.

== History ==
The anthem was performed for the first time for the ceremony of opening of the first edition at the 1896 Summer Olympics in Athens, Greece. In the following years, every hosting nation commissioned to various musicians the composition of a specific Olympic hymn for their own edition of the Games.

The anthem by Samaras and Palamas was declared the official Olympic Anthem by the International Olympic Committee in 1958 at the 54th Session of the IOC in Tokyo, Japan. The anthem was performed in English at the 1960 Winter Olympics in Squaw Valley and since then it has been played at each Olympic Games: during the opening ceremony when the Olympic flag is hoisted, and during the closing ceremony when the Olympic flag is lowered. The hymn was also sung during the Olympic flame lighting ceremony before the national anthems were sung.

The Olympic Hymn was also used, along with the Olympic flag, to represent the Unified Team of former Soviet states at the 1992 Winter and 1992 Summer Olympics.

== Lyrics ==
=== Greek original ===
Greek script

Αρχαίο Πνεύμα αθάνατο, αγνέ πατέρα
του ωραίου, του μεγάλου και του αληθινού,
Κατέβα, φανερώσου κι άστραψε εδώ πέρα
στη δόξα της δικής σου γης και τ' ουρανού.

Στο δρόμο και στο πάλεμα και στο λιθάρι
Στων ευγενών αγώνων λάμψε την ορμή
Και με το αμάραντο στεφάνωσε κλωνάρι
𝄆 και σιδερένιο πλάσε και άξιο το κορμί. 𝄇

Κάμποι, βουνά και θάλασσες φέγγουνε μαζί σου
σαν ένας λευκοπόρφυρος μέγας ναός.
𝄆 Και τρέχει στο ναό εδώ προσκυνητής σου 𝄇
𝄆 Αρχαίο Πνεύμα αθάνατο, κάθε λαός. 𝄇

Latin script

Archaeo Pneuma athanato, agne patera
tū oraeū, tū megalū, cae tū alēthinū
Cateba, phanerōsū ci astrapse edō pera
stē doxa tēs dicēs sū gēs cae t' ūranū.

Sto dromo cae sto palema cae sto lithari
Stōn eugenōn agōnōn lampse tēn ormē
Cae me to amaranto stephanōse clōnari
𝄆 cae siderenio plase ci axio to cormi. 𝄇

Campoe, būna cae thalasses pheghūne mazi sū
san enas leucoporphyros megas naos
𝄆 Cae trechī sto nao edō proscynētēs sū 𝄇
𝄆 Archaeo Pneuma athanato, cathe laos. 𝄇

IPA transcription (Note: See Help:IPA/Greek and Modern Greek phonology.)

[aɾˈçe.o ˈpnev.ma‿aˈθa.na.to | aɣˈne paˈte.ɾa |]
[tu‿oˈɾe.u | tu meˈɣa.lu | ce tu‿a.li.θiˈnu ǁ]
[kaˈte.va fa.neˈɾo.su | c‿ˈa.stɾa.pse‿eˈðo ˈpe.ɾa |]
[sti ˈðo.ksa tiz‿ðiˈcis su | ʝis ce t‿u.ra.ˈnu ǁ]

[sto ˈðɾo.mo ce sto ˈpa.le.ma | ce sto liˈθa.ɾi |]
[ston ev.ʝeˈnon aˈɣo.non | ˈla(m).pse tin oɾˈmi ǁ]
[ce me to‿aˈma.ɾan.do steˈfa.no.se kloˈna.ɾi |]
𝄆 [ce si.ðeˈɾe.ɲo ˈpla.se ce‿ˈa.ksi̯o to koɾˈmi ǁ] 𝄇

[ˈka.(m)bi vuˈna ce ˈθa.la.ses ˈfe.gu.ne maˈzi su |]
[san ˈe.naz‿lef.koˈpoɾ.fi.ɾos | ˈme.ɣaz‿naˈos ǁ]
𝄆 [ce ˈtɾe.çi sto naˈo eˈðo | pɾo.sci.niˈtis su |] 𝄇
𝄆 [aɾˈçe.o ˈpnev.ma‿aˈθa.na.to | 𝄆 ˈka.θe laˈos ǁ] 𝄇

Literal translation

O Ancient Spirit immortal, pure father
of the beautiful, the great and the true,
Descend, appear, and sparkle over here
to the glory of thine own earth and heaven.

At running and at wrestling and at throwing,
shine in the momentum of noble contests,
and crown with the unfading branch,
𝄆 and make the body worthy and ironlike. 𝄇

Plains, mountains and seas shine with thee
like a great white-purple temple.
𝄆 And thy pilgrim is running to this here temple, 𝄇
𝄆 O Ancient Spirit immortal, of every people. 𝄇

=== English version ===
Olympian flame immortal
Whose beacon lights our way
Emblaze our hearts with the fires of hope
On this momentous day
As now we come across the world
To share these Games of old
Let all the flags of every land
In brotherhood unfold
Sing out each nation, voices strong
Rise up in harmony
All hail our brave Olympians
With strains of victory
Olympic light burn on and on
O'er seas and mountains and plains
Unite, inspire, bring honor
To these ascending games

May valor reign victorious
Along the path of golden way
As tomorrow's new champions now come forth
Rising to the fervent spirit of the game
Let splendour pervade each noble deed
Crowned with glory and fame
And let fraternity and fellowship
Surround the soul of every nation
Oh flame, eternal in your firmament so bright
Illuminate us with your everlasting light
That grace and beauty and magnificence
Shine like the sun
Blazing above
Bestow on us your honor, truth and love (Note: This version, although often performed at opening and closing ceremonies, appears to enjoy far less exposure than the original. Hence its words may be determined only by listening to performances; correspondents will most probably disagree on the correct form. An alternate ending to the lyrics (used at the opening ceremony of the Los Angeles Olympics) was, "Bestow on us the wondrous prize of honor, truth and love.")

== List of performances at the Olympics ==
Before 2016, the anthem had been recorded and performed in many different languages, usually as a result of the hosting of either form of the Games in various countries. However, in the 2008 and 2022 Olympic opening and closing ceremonies, in Beijing, China, Greek was sung instead of the host country's official language, Mandarin. Also in the 2016 Olympic opening and closing ceremonies in Rio de Janeiro, Brazil, English was sung instead of host country's official language, Brazilian Portuguese. Since 2018, the IOC requires that the anthem be performed in either English, Greek or instrumentally (although this is optional depending on the organizer of an Olympics).

Olympics	City	Language performed	Notes
1896 Summer	Athens, Greece	Greek	The anthem was performed for the first time at the opening ceremony.
1960 Winter	Squaw Valley, United States	English	This was the first time that the Olympic Hymn was performed since the Athens 1896 games.
1960 Summer	Rome, Italy	Italian	
1964 Winter	Innsbruck, Austria	German	
1964 Summer	Tokyo, Japan	Japanese	The anthem was sung in Japanese.
1968 Winter	Grenoble, France	French	
1968 Summer	Mexico City, Mexico	Spanish	
1972 Winter	Sapporo, Japan	Japanese	
1972 Summer	Munich, West Germany	Instrumental	An instrumental arrangement was used during the opening and closing ceremonies.
1976 Winter	Innsbruck, Austria	Greek (opening); Instrumental (closing)	In the opening ceremony, the anthem was sung in Greek. In the closing ceremony, an instrumental arrangement was used. In both cases, instead of the third verse, the first verse was performed once again.
1976 Summer	Montreal, Canada	Greek	The anthem was sung in Greek.
1980 Winter	Lake Placid, United States	English	
1980 Summer	Moscow, Soviet Union	Russian (opening); Greek (closing)	The anthem was sung in Russian at the opening ceremony then in Greek at the closing ceremony. The anthem was performed by the Red Army Choir and Bolshoi Theater Chorus.
1984 Winter	Sarajevo, Yugoslavia	Serbo-Croatian	
1984 Summer	Los Angeles, United States	English	
1988 Winter	Calgary, Canada	Greek	The anthem was sung in Greek.
1988 Summer	Seoul, Republic of Korea	Korean	The anthem was performed in Korean.
1992 Winter	Albertville, France	Instrumental	The anthem was performed instrumentally.
1992 Summer	Barcelona, Spain	Catalan, Spanish, and French (opening); Spanish and English (closing)	At the opening ceremony, Alfredo Kraus sang the anthem's first two stanzas in Catalan and the rest of the anthem in Spanish and French. At the closing ceremony, Plácido Domingo sang it in both Spanish and English lyrics.
1994 Winter	Lillehammer, Norway	Norwegian	Sung by Sissel Kyrkjebø with the children's choir.
1996 Summer	Atlanta, United States	English	Performed at the opening ceremony by the 300 voices of the Centennial Olympic Choir with the Atlanta Symphony Orchestra and at the closing ceremony by Jennifer Larmore and the Morehouse College Glee Club with the Atlanta Symphony Youth Orchestra.
1998 Winter	Nagano, Japan	Japanese	Performed by the Nagano Festival Orchestra and sung by the Nagano City Children's Chorus Group in Japanese.
2000 Summer	Sydney, Australia	Greek (opening) English (closing)	These were the first Olympics in which the anthem was conducted in both languages the IOC require it be performed in. At the opening ceremony, performed in Greek by the Millennium Choir of the Greek Orthodox Archdiocese of Australia with the Sydney Symphony Orchestra in recognition of the substantial Greek population of Australia. At closing ceremony, performed in English by Australian soprano Yvonne Kenny.
2002 Winter	Salt Lake City, United States	English	Sung by the Mormon Tabernacle Choir at the opening ceremony and by Laura Garff-Lewis at the closing ceremony.
2004 Summer	Athens, Greece	Greek	In Greek; sung to the arrangement of John Psathas.
2006 Winter	Turin, Italy	Instrumental	At these Olympics, an abbreviated version was performed instrumentally.
2008 Summer	Beijing, China	Greek	The anthem was sung in Greek by the children's choir.
2010 Winter	Vancouver, Canada	English and French	These were the first Olympics that the anthem was performed in both of its official languages. This was done to reflect the official bilingualism in Canada. Measha Brueggergosman at the opening ceremony and Ben Heppner at the closing ceremony sang the first two, the fourth, and sixth stanzas in English and the remainder in French.
2010 Youth	Singapore	Greek	The anthem was sung in Greek.
2012 Youth	Innsbruck, Austria	Instrumental	The anthem was performed instrumentally.
2012 Summer	London, United Kingdom	Instrumental (opening); English (closing)	Performed instrumentally in the opening ceremony by the London Symphony Orchestra and the Grimethorpe Colliery Band. During the closing ceremony, it was performed in English by the London Welsh Male Voice and Rugby Club choirs.
2014 Winter	Sochi, Russia	Russian (opening); Instrumental (closing)	Sung in Russian in the same translation as in the 1980 Summer Olympics in Moscow, by Anna Netrebko with the Sretensky Monastery Men's Choir at the opening ceremony. The Instrumental version which also played at the London 2012 Opening Ceremony by the London Symphony Orchestra and the Grimethorpe Colliery Band was used at the closing ceremony.
2014 Youth	Nanjing, China	Instrumental	Performed instrumentally (at the London 2012 Opening Ceremony by the London Symphony Orchestra and the Grimethorpe Colliery Band) at both the opening and closing ceremonies.
2016 Youth	Lillehammer, Norway	Norwegian	A choral version was sung in Norwegian using the same lyrics from the 1994 Winter Olympics.
2016 Summer	Rio de Janeiro, Brazil	English	The anthem was sung in English by the More Project Youth Choir from Niterói, a city from the Rio de Janeiro Metropolitan Area.
2018 Winter	Pyeongchang, South Korea	Greek (Opening); English (Closing)	The first Winter Olympics in which the anthem was performed in both of the languages the IOC requires it be performed in. It was performed in Greek by Hwang Su-mi at the opening ceremony and in English by then 11-year-old Oh Yeon-joon at the closing ceremony.
2018 Youth	Buenos Aires, Argentina	English	Performed by Luna Sujatovich and Melina Moguilevsky respectively at the opening and closing ceremonies.
2020 Youth	Lausanne, Switzerland	English and French (opening); Instrumental (closing)	A bilingual version was sung at the opening ceremony by the children's choir "Les Petits Chanteurs de Lausanne". These were the second Olympics (first Youth Olympics) that the anthem was performed in both of its official languages.
2020 Summer	Tokyo, Japan	English	Sung in English at the opening ceremony by both the students of Fukushima Koriyama and Toshimagaoka Girls' high schools and by Tomotaka Okamoto at the closing ceremony.
2022 Winter	Beijing, China	Greek	The anthem was sung in Greek by 40 children from Malanhua'er Children's Choir from Hebei Province.
2024 Youth	Gangwon, South Korea	English	Performed by the Gangneung Junior Choir at the opening and closing ceremony, with 5 alumni of the original choir at the closing ceremony.
2024 Summer	Paris, France	Greek (opening); English (closing)	The second Summer Olympics in which the anthem was conducted in both languages the IOC require it be performed in. Performed in Greek by the Radio France Choir and the Maîtrise de Radio France at the opening ceremony, and in English by the Maîtrise de Fontainebleau at the closing ceremony.
2026 Winter	Milan–Cortina d'Ampezzo, Italy	English (opening); Greek (closing)	The second Winter Olympics in which the anthem was performed in both of the languages the IOC requires it be performed in.
2026 Youth	Dakar, Senegal	Instrumental	
2028 Youth	Dolomites–Valtellina, Italy		
2028 Summer	Los Angeles, United States		
2030 Winter	French Alps, France		
2032 Summer	Brisbane, Australia		
2034 Winter	Utah, United States		

== See also ==
- Olympic symbols
- List of Olympic songs and anthems
- Anthems of international organizations
- Earth anthem
