= Nut rage incident =

2014 air rage incident in New York City

Coordinates: 40.6413°N 73.7782°W

Nut rage incident Korean Air Flight 086
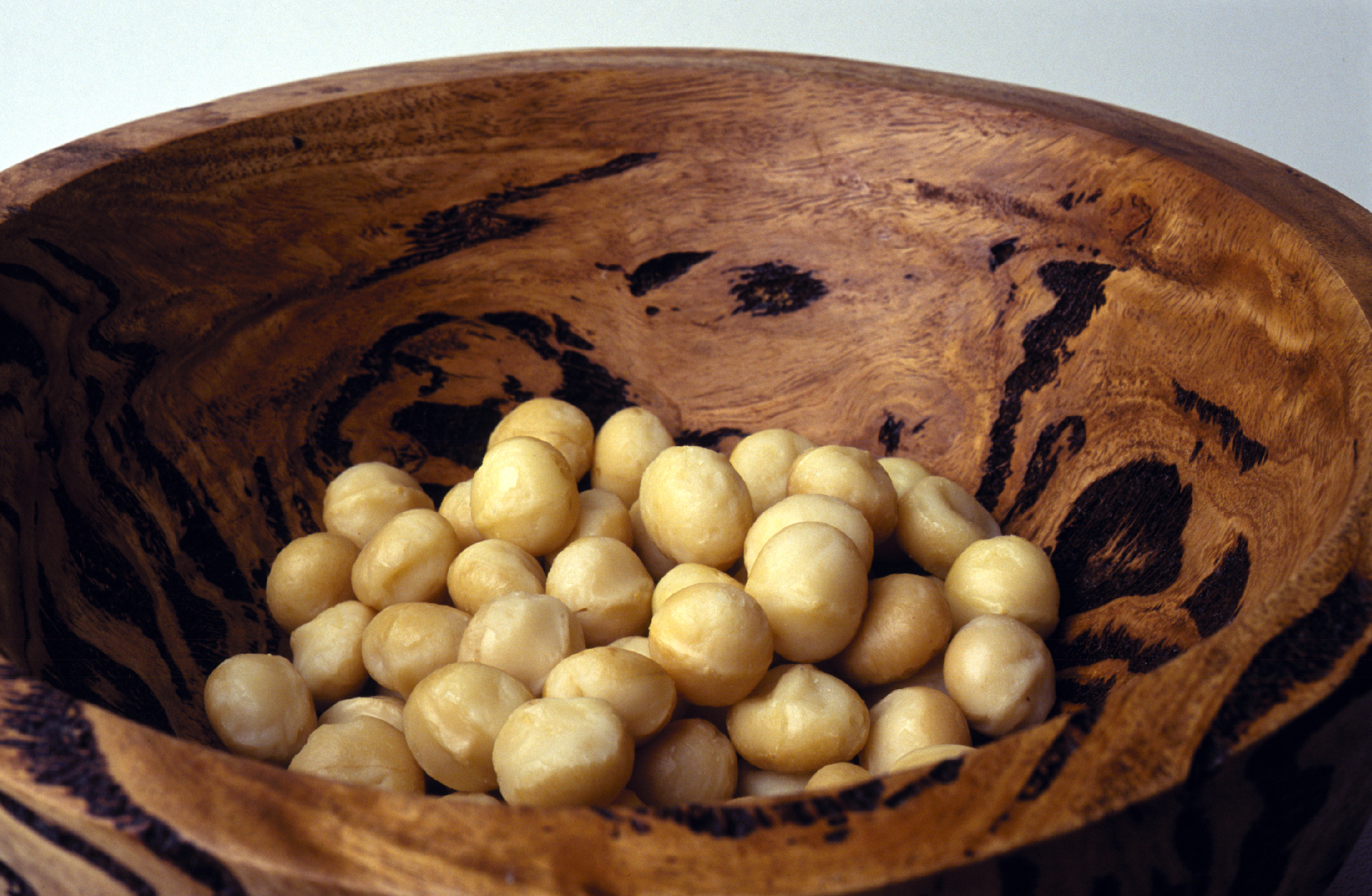
- Macadamia nuts in a bowl

Incident
- Date: December 5, 2014
- Summary: Air rage incident
- Site: John F. Kennedy Airport, New York

Aircraft
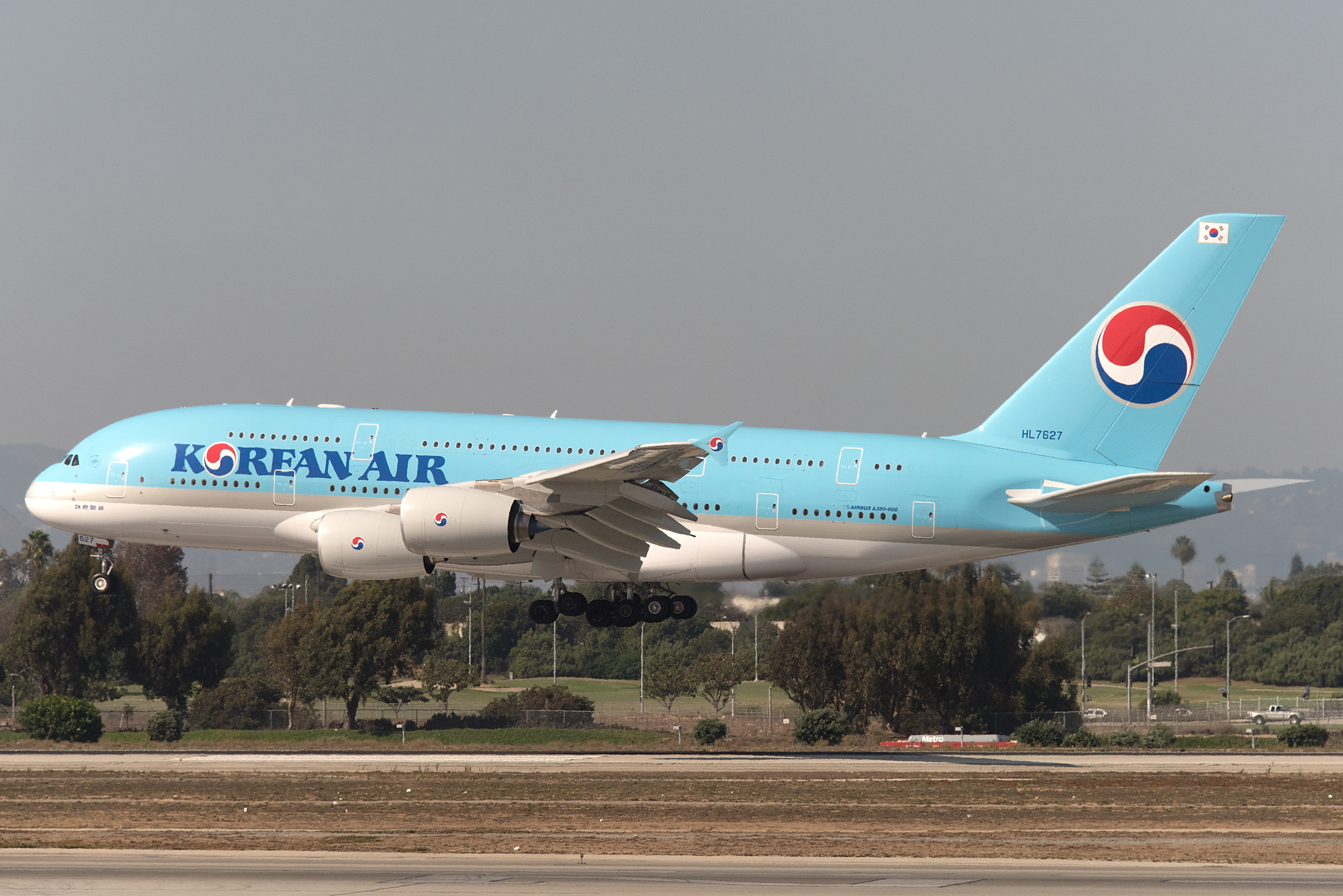
- HL7627, the aircraft involved in the incident, pictured in October 2014
- Aircraft type: Airbus A380-861
- Operator: Korean Air
- IATA flight No.: KE086
- ICAO flight No.: KAL086
- Call sign: KOREAN AIR 086
- Registration: HL7627
- Flight origin: John F. Kennedy International Airport, New York, United States
- Destination: Incheon International Airport, South Korea
- Occupants: 273
- Passengers: 250
- Crew: 23
- Fatalities: 0
- Injuries: 1
- Survivors: 273

The nut rage incident, colloquially referred to as "nutgate", (Korean: 땅콩 회항, romanized: Ttangkong hoehang) was an air rage incident that occurred on December 5, 2014, at John F. Kennedy International Airport in New York City onboard Korean Air Flight 086. Heather Cho (Korean name: Cho Hyun-ah; later changed to Cho Seung-yeon), a vice president of Korean Air and daughter of CEO Cho Yang-ho, was dissatisfied with the way a flight attendant served macadamia nuts on the plane, and ordered the aircraft to return to the airport gate before takeoff.

The incident began when all first class passengers, including Cho, were given nut snacks bagged in their original packaging, in keeping with the airline's procedures. However, Cho had expected them to be served on a plate in first class, so she verbally abused the serving flight attendant and questioned the cabin crew chief about the standard procedure of serving the nuts. After a heated confrontation, where Cho publicly humiliated both the cabin crew chief and the flight attendant by ordering them to kneel in front of everyone, she physically assaulted the two crew members and then ordered the chief to be expelled off the plane, forcing the captain to request the already taxiing aircraft be allowed to return to the gate, thus delaying the flight for about 20 minutes.

When the incident became public, Cho and Korean Air were heavily criticized, and in the aftermath, Cho resigned from one of her several executive positions at Korean Air. She was subsequently found guilty in a South Korean court of obstructing aviation safety and given a twelve-month prison sentence, of which she served five months. The flight attendant and cabin crew chief had returned to their positions by April 2016.

== Initial incident and official report ==
On December 5, 2014, Heather Cho (Korean name: Cho Hyun-ah; Korean: 조현아), a businesswoman and daughter of the then Korean Air chairman and CEO, Cho Yang-ho, boarded Korean Air Flight 086, an Airbus A380 registered as HL7627, at John F. Kennedy International Airport, destined for Incheon International Airport near Seoul. Prior to takeoff, she was served macadamia nuts in a closed bag rather than on a plate.

Upon being served the nuts in a sack, Cho rebuked flight attendant Kim Do-hee and called over cabin crew chief Park Chang-jin to complain because they were not served on a plate. It was alleged that, under Cho's orders, the chief was forced to kneel down before her and beg for forgiveness. Cho repeatedly struck Park's knuckles with the edge of a digital tablet, and summarily dismissed him. Cho ordered the chief to get off the plane, requiring it to taxi back to the airport's gate. The incident created a delay of approximately 20 minutes for the flight with 250 people on board. The chief allegedly initially agreed with executives to refrain from making public statements and disclosing the incident to officials, but when he and the flight attendant heard about Cho's apparent attempts to spread false rumors of sexual relations between the flight attendant and chief, he decided to file an official complaint.

Korean Air issued an apology to passengers, but attempted to justify Cho's action, saying it was in accordance with her job of inspecting in-flight service and airplane safety. They apologized for the inconvenience. Initially, the Ministry of Land, Infrastructure and Transport said that the Aviation and Railway Accident Investigation Board was investigating the case. An aggrieved first class passenger contacted the airline about the incident she observed, and received a model airplane and a calendar in the mail by way of apology.

== Controversy ==
Following Park's ejection from the flight and subsequent demotion, the airline contacted him over a dozen times, pressuring him to tell the South Korean transport authorities that he had voluntarily resigned. Two members of the investigative team assigned to the incident were former Korean Air employees. Transport Minister Suh Seoung-hwan expressed confidence that the team would conduct their investigation independently and fairly. The flight attendant, however, believed that the government investigation would be unjust, and instead reported the incident directly to the media, initiating a public furor. Suh pledged to refer the matter to prosecutors and request "strict penalties" if the investigation showed collusion with the airline. Lawmakers were skeptical and wanted the Board of Audit and Inspection to intervene.

After the incident was made public, it was revealed that Cho had attacked a flight attendant in 2013 after being served improperly cooked ramen noodles. This incident had been covered up by the airline, which found no wrongdoing. According to the police, a company executive ordered employees to delete records of the nut rage incident. It was also known that Heather Cho's representative, Korean Air, pressured the victims (flight attendant and the chief) to lie about the incident, and downplay what happened while being publicly questioned. But unaffiliated witnesses (including a first-class passenger) corroborated the victims' accounts by describing how Cho threw the packet of nuts and physically attacked the employees, and the plan was leaked, stirring the controversy even further. Cho herself denied any such actions despite widespread skepticism.

When the incident became public, there was popular indignation against Cho and Korean Air. Korean Air responded to public outrage by forcing Cho to resign from her job as vice-president. She initially said she would resign from all positions, but actually kept her positions as chairperson of Korean Air and president of KAL Hotel Network and Hanjin Tour. Despite the early cover-up, criminal charges were later brought against her. It was thought that Korean Air could be fined around US$2 million. Cho attended the Aviation and Railway Accident Investigation Board's investigation on December 12, saying she would issue an apology to the cabin crew chief and flight attendant in question. Cho's father, Korean Air chairman Cho Yang-ho, also apologized for his daughter's "foolish act". Heather Cho visited the homes of the cabin crew chief and flight attendant to apologize in person, but left them notes because they were not at home.

One of the reasons for the widespread press coverage of the incident, particularly in South Korea, was that it illustrated the apparent widespread power (and abuse of it) held by the members of South Korean family businesses (chaebols). Passenger rates on Korean Air domestic flights dropped 6.6% in December 2014, compared to the previous year.

== Litigation ==
=== Trial ===
On January 12, 2015, a member of the National Assembly of South Korea released papers from Cho's indictment which showed for the first time that macadamia nuts were properly served in a bag, according to the airline's manual. Furthermore, Cho had been informed of this, and the specific reason she gave for the cabin crew chief's firing was that he had not informed her earlier.

The trial began on January 19 in the Seoul Western District Court with the defendant denying all charges. When Cho's father appeared in court, he asserted that the chief could work with no disadvantages. Despite a court summons, the chief did not appear in court. The flight attendant who served the nuts appeared, and testified that Cho had pushed her and made her kneel. She also said that she had been offered a teaching position at a KAL-affiliated college.

On February 12, 2015, Cho was given a one-year prison sentence for obstructing aviation safety. The Seoul Western District Court handed the sentence to Cho during a hearing, saying she was guilty of changing the flight plan, an offense that carries the penalty of up to ten years in prison.

On May 22, 2015, in Seoul High Court, she was found not guilty of changing the aircraft's route. The sentence was reduced to ten months and suspended for two years. Cho was released immediately, having served five months in prison.

=== Civil suits ===
The flight attendant, Kim Do-hee, and the cabin crew chief, Park Chang-jin, filed a civil lawsuit in the Supreme Court of the State of New York in March 2015 against both Cho and the airline, seeking compensation for an alleged verbal and physical attack by Cho. They were represented by two law firms and were seeking unspecified compensatory and punitive damages. Kim also alleged that she was pressured by the airline to lie to government investigators in a bid to cover up the incident as well as appear in public with Cho to help "rehabilitate Cho's public image". Both cases were dismissed as "all parties (concerned), evidences, and witnesses" were in South Korea.

In a separate suit, the Seoul Western District Court ordered that Korean Air pay the flight attendant 20 million KRW (about 18,000 USD) for attempting to coerce him to drop the case. He is also entitled to another 30 million KRW (about 27,000 USD) as compensation for Cho's assaults and insults.

== Aftermath ==
=== Increase of macadamia sales volume ===
The sales of macadamia nuts in South Korea rose nearly 250 percent shortly after the incident.

=== Television parody ===
On December 14 and 28, Korean Sunday comedy show Gag Concert aired a parody on its sketch comedy television program. As a guest of Radio Star and other TV shows, Kang Kyun-sung, a singer in South Korea, gained popularity by imitating the facial expressions Cho showed while being tried in court. The South Korean drama Persevere, Goo Hae-Ra on the Mnet channel included a filmed parody of the incident but, for unknown reasons, it was not broadcast. There were suspicions that pressure had been applied from the chaebol (Korean family owned business) to stop the broadcast, but the producers denied this.

=== Gapjil ===
The incident helped popularize the Korean neologism gapjil (갑질; lit. 'bad superior'), referring to the arrogant and authoritarian attitude or actions of people who have positions of power over others.

== See also ==
- Gapjil
- Workplace bullying
- 2014 in aviation
- List of air rage incidents
- List of -gate scandals and controversies
