= Sochi 2014 Olympic and Paralympic Organizing Committee =

Organizing Committee of the XXII Olympic Winter Games and XI Paralympic Winter Games of 2014 in Sochi Организационный комитет XXII Олимпийских зимних игр и XI Паралимпийских зимних игр 2014 года в г. Сочи
- Website: sochi2014.com

The Organizing Committee of the XXII Olympic Winter Games and XI Paralympic Winter Games of 2014 in Sochi is the organization responsible for the 2014 Winter Olympics and 2014 Winter Paralympics in Sochi, Russia. It was established on 2 October 2007 by the Russian Olympic Committee, the Federal Agency for Physical Culture and Sports, and the Administration of the City of Sochi.

== Chief Executive Officer ==
- Dmitry Chernyshenko

== Supervisory Board ==
- Alexander Zhukov - First Deputy Chairman of the State Duma of the Russian Federation, President of the ROC (Chairman of the Supervisory Board)
- Dmitry Chernyshenko - President of the Sochi 2014 Organizing Committee
- Alexey Gromov - Deputy Chief of Staff of the Presidential Administration of the Russian Federation
- Vitaly Mutko - Minister of Sports of the Russian Federation
- Sergey Gaplikov - President of the State Corporation Olympstroy
- Tatiana Dobrokhvalova - First Vice President of the Sochi 2014 Organizing Committee, Secretary of the Supervisory Board
- Alexandr Tkachyov - Head of the Administration of Krasnodar Krai
- Vladimir Lukin - Commissioner for Human Rights in the Russian Federation, President of the Russian Paralympic Committee
- Viacheslav Fetisov - Chairman of the Federal Council Commission on Physical Culture, Sports and Development of the Olympic Movement
- Leonid Tyagachyov
- Vladimir Kozhin - Chief of Staff of the President of the Russian Federation
- Dmitry Peskov - Press Secretary of the President of the Russian Federation
- Vitali Smirnov - Honorary President of the Russian Olympic Committee, member of the International Olympic Committee
- Shamil Tarpishchev - President of the Russian Tennis Federation, member of the International Olympic Committee
- Alexandr Popov - member of the International Olympic Committee
- Mikhail Terentyev - Secretary General of the Russian Paralympic Committee
- Anatoly Pakhomov - Mayor of Sochi
- Vladimir Potanin - CEO, Chairman of the Board of Directors of Interros
- Alexei Kudrin
- Dmitry Kozak
- Semyon Vainshtok
- Viktor Khotochkin
- Viktor Kolodyazhny
