= Lee Hee-beom =

South Korean politician

Lee Hee-beom Olympic Order
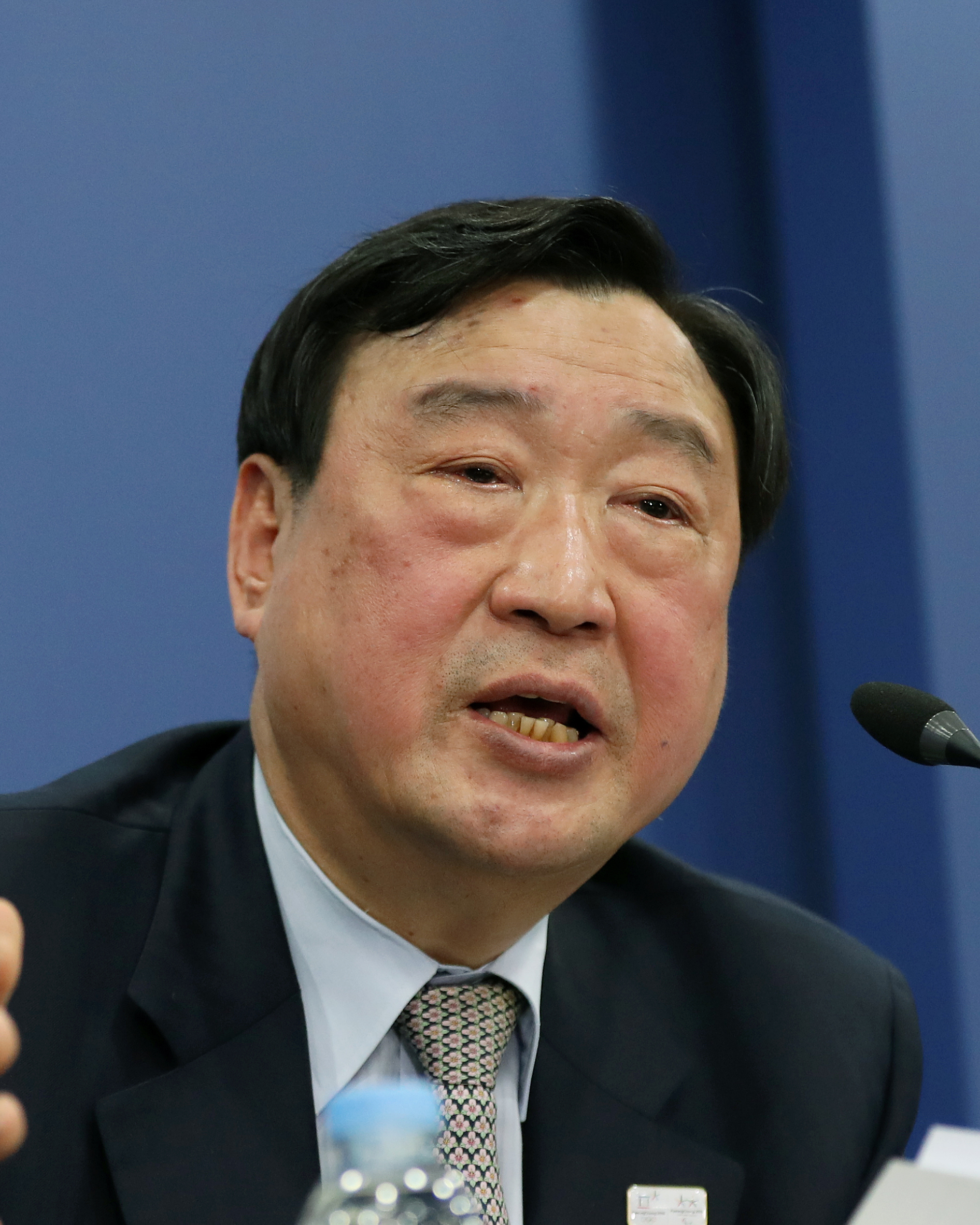
- Lee in 2017

President & CEO of the PyeongChang Organizing Committee for the 2018 Olympic & Paralympic Winter Games
- In office May 4, 2016 – March 25, 2018
- IOC President: Thomas Bach
- Preceded by: Cho Yang-ho
- Succeeded by: Cai Qi

Chair of the PyeongChang Organizing Committee for the 2018 Olympic & Paralympic Winter Games
- In office May 4, 2016 – March 31, 2019
- Preceded by: Cho Yang-ho
- Succeeded by: Position dissolved

8th Minister of Commerce, Industry and Energy
- In office December 17, 2003 – February 10, 2006
- President: Roh Moo-hyun
- Preceded by: Yoon Jin-shik
- Succeeded by: Chung Sye-kyun

Personal details
- Born: 23 March 1949 (age 77) Chilgok, North Gyeongsang Province, South Korea

Korean name
- Hangul: 이희범
- Hanja: 李熙範
- RR: I Huibeom
- MR: I Hŭibŏm

Lee Hee-beom (Korean: 이희범; born March 23, 1949) is a South Korean politician. He took over as President of the Pyeongchang Organizing Committee for the 2018 Winter Olympics to succeed Cho Yang-ho after his resignation.

== Early life ==
Lee Hee-beom was born on March 23, 1949, in Andong, South Korea.

== Education ==
Lee graduated from Seoul National University High School, Seoul National University, BS Seoul National University Graduate School of Public Administration, George Washington University Master of Business Administration, Kyunghee University, Graduate School, Doctor of Business Administration Hoseo University Honorary Doctorate.

== Sports career ==
On May 4, 2016, he was nominated as President & CEO of the Pyeongchang Organizing Committee for XXIII Olympic Winter Games to replace Cho Yang-ho since stepping down on May 3.

In 2018, he was given the gold Olympic Order award and the Paralympic Order award after his efforts in coordinating the 2018 Winter Olympics and Paralympics in Pyeongchang.

Sporting positions
Preceded by (South Korea) Cho Yang-ho	President of Organizing Committee for Winter Olympic Games; 2018	Succeeded by (China) Cai Qi
Political offices
Preceded by Yoon Jin-shik	Minister of Trade, Industry and Energy; 2003–2006	Succeeded by Chung Sye-kyun
Preceded by		Succeeded by
