= PyeongChang Organizing Committee for the 2018 Olympic & Paralympic Winter Games =

2018 Olympics local organizing committee

The PyeongChang Organizing Committee for the 2018 Olympic & Paralympic Winter Games (POCOG) is an organisation that oversees the planning and development of the 2018 Winter Olympic and Paralympic Games. POCOG's headquarters is located in the host city of PyeongChang with two offices in Gangneung and Seoul.

== Leadership ==
Kim Jin-sun was appointed as the first president of POCOG. A former Governor of the Gangwon Province, he was Special Ambassador for the Pyeongchang's Olympic Bid.

The second president of POCOG, Cho Yang-ho, is Chairman of Hanjin Group. President Cho had enjoyed a long-standing relationship with the Olympic movement and was active in Pyeongchang's bid for the Olympic Winter Games. On May 3, 2016, President Cho resigned on the ground of returning to focus on his company, Hanjin Group.

On May 3, 2016, the government announced Lee Hee-beom, a former Minister of Trade, Industry, and Energy, as the third president to head POCOG. Last October, with the consideration of lack of promotion and ticket sales of Winter Olympic Games, Organizing Committee nominated Kim Joo-ho, President of Collabo K and Master at Cheil Worldwide (Samsung), as Executive Vice President of Games Planning and Communications. Kim Jae-youl, President of the Korea Skating Union (KSU) and President of Cheil Industries, joined POCOG as Executive Vice President of International Relations.

== Organizational structure ==
POCOG comprises Advisory Committee, whose members include the Prime Minister, Chairman of the National Assembly, IOC Member Lee Kun-hee, Chairman of the Federation of the Korean Industries, six Vice Chairmen, Executive Board, and Advisory Group. The Secretariat is led by Secretary-General and three Vice Secretaries-General.
