= Willi Daume =

German athlete

Willi Daume (24 May 1913 – 20 May 1996) was a German businessman, athlete and sports administrator. He was president of the Deutscher Sportbund from 1950 to 1970 and of the National Olympic Committee for Germany from 1961 to 1992.

A member of the International Olympic Committee (IOC) from 1956 to 1991, he served as its vice-president from 1972 to 1976 and chaired the organising committee for the 1972 Summer Olympics in Munich.

== Early life and sport ==
Daume was born in Hückeswagen and owned an iron foundry in Dortmund. He studied business administration, economics and law, but left without a degree in 1938 after his father's death to take over the foundry.

At Eintracht Dortmund, Daume took part principally in athletics and handball. He was retrained as a basketball player and was a reserve on Germany's basketball team at the 1936 Summer Olympics in Berlin, but did not play in the tournament.

== Nazi period ==
Daume joined the Nazi Party in 1937. During the Second World War, his iron foundry used 65 forced labourers. From 1943, he worked as an informant for the SS Sicherheitsdienst (SD), preparing reports for the organisation. He later said that he had done so to avoid service at the front and claimed that his reports were so nonsensical that the SD lost interest in his cooperation.

== Postwar sports administration ==
After the war, Daume became involved in rebuilding sports organisations at regional level. He served as president of the German Handball Association from 1949 to 1955. In 1950 he was elected president of the Deutscher Sportbund, initially as a compromise candidate, and remained in office until 1970.

Daume joined the IOC in 1956 and subsequently headed several of its commissions. He helped bring the 1972 Summer Olympics to Munich and chaired their organising committee. His plans connected the sporting events with architecture, art and culture.

In 1980, Daume opposed West Germany's boycott of the Moscow Olympics, but failed to prevent it. He also stood unsuccessfully for the IOC presidency that year; Juan Antonio Samaranch was elected. At the Olympic Congress in Baden-Baden in 1981, which he helped organise, Daume contributed to changes in the Olympic movement and the relaxation of its amateur eligibility rules.

Daume resigned from the IOC in 1991 and became an honorary member. He remained president of Germany's National Olympic Committee until 1992.

He also helped establish the Deutsche Sporthilfe foundation and later chaired it.

== Doping ==
Daume's response to doping came under renewed scrutiny in the 2010s. In 2011, sports historian Giselher Spitzer reported a longstanding relationship of trust between Daume and sports physician Joseph Keul, who had provided Daume with inside information about anabolic steroid use. The researchers interpreted Daume's failure to intervene as knowing acquiescence.

In a report commissioned by the University of Freiburg, Andreas Singler and Gerhard Treutlein described Daume as aware of widespread doping in West Germany, while also being opposed in principle to manipulation in elite sport. They cautioned that his knowledge should not be taken to mean that he had been part of an active conspiracy to promote doping.

In July 1991, Daume wrote to Samaranch proposing stricter Olympic eligibility requirements. Under his proposal, athletes would be admitted only from countries that permitted doping tests during competition and training.

== Later life and commemoration ==
Daume's company encountered financial difficulties in 1993. He spent his final years in modest circumstances in a small apartment in Munich's former Olympic Village. He died of cancer in Munich on 20 May 1996, aged 82, and was buried in Dortmund.

A square in Munich's Olympiapark has been named Willi-Daume-Platz since 1998. Daume was inducted into the Hall of Fame of German Sports in 2006.
