= President of the Organising Committee for the Olympic Games =

The president of the Organising Committee for the Olympic Games is the individual who is in charge of leading the Organising Committee for each Olympic Games. Starting after 1988, the Paralympic Games began occurring after the conclusion of the Olympic Games, organised by the same committee. During the opening and closing ceremonies, the president gives a speech before the IOC and IPC president.

== Lists of presidents ==
=== Summer Olympic Games ===
President	Game	Host city	Host country	Year
Prince Constantine of Greece	I	Athens	Kingdom of Greece	1896
Pierre de Coubertin	II	Paris	France	1900
David R. Francis	III	St. Louis	United States	1904
William Grenfell, 1st Baron Desborough	IV	London	United Kingdom	1908
Sigfrid Edström	V	Stockholm	Sweden	1912
Henri de Baillet-Latour	VII	Antwerp	Belgium	1920
Pierre de Coubertin	VIII	Paris	France	1924
Solko van den Bergh	IX	Amsterdam	Netherlands	1928
William May Garland	X	Los Angeles	United States	1932
Joseph Goebbels; Karl Ritter von Halt	XI	Berlin	Nazi Germany	1936
Lord Burghley	XIV	London	United Kingdom	1948
Erik von Frenckell	XV	Helsinki	Finland	1952
Wilfrid Kent Hughes	XVI	Melbourne	Australia	1956
Giulio Andreotti	XVII	Rome	Italy	1960
Juichi Tsushima; Daigoro Yasukawa	XVIII	Tokyo	Japan	1964
Pedro Ramírez Vázquez	XIX	Mexico City	Mexico	1968
Willi Daume	XX	Munich	West Germany	1972
Roger Rousseau	XXI	Montreal	Canada	1976
Konstantin Chernenko; Ignati Novikov	XXII	Moscow	Soviet Union	1980
Peter Ueberroth	XXIII	Los Angeles	United States	1984
Kim Yong-shik; Roh Tae-woo; Park Seh-jik	XXIV	Seoul	South Korea	1988
Pasqual Maragall	XXV	Barcelona	Spain	1992
Billy Payne	XXVI	Atlanta	United States	1996
Gary Pemberton; John Iliffe; Michael Knight	XXVII	Sydney	Australia	2000
Efstratios Stratigis; Panayiotis Thomopoulos; Gianna Angelopoulos-Daskalaki	XXVIII	Athens	Greece	2004
Liu Qi	XXIX	Beijing	China	2008
Lord Sebastian Coe	XXX	London	United Kingdom	2012
Carlos Arthur Nuzman	XXXI	Rio de Janeiro	Brazil	2016
Yoshirō Mori; Seiko Hashimoto	XXXII	Tokyo	Japan	2021
Tony Estanguet	XXXIII	Paris	France	2024
Casey Wasserman	XXXIV	Los Angeles	United States	2028
Andrew Liveris	XXXV	Brisbane	Australia	2032

=== Winter Olympic Games ===
President	Game	Host city	Host country	Year
Pierre de Coubertin	I	Chamonix	France	1924
Edmund Schulthess	II	St Moritz	Switzerland	1928
Godfrey Dewey	III	Lake Placid	United States	1932
Joseph Goebbels; Karl Ritter von Halt	IV	Garmisch-Partenkirchen	Nazi Germany	1936
Alfred Schläppi; Heinrich Schläppi	V	St. Moritz	Switzerland	1948
Haakon VII of Norway; Princess Astrid of Norway; Olaf Helset	VI	Oslo	Norway	1952
Paolo Ignazio Maria Thaon di Revel	VII	Cortina d'Ampezzo	Italy	1956
Prentis Cobb Hale	VIII	Squaw Valley	United States	1960
Bruno Kreisky	IX	Innsbruck	Austria	1964
Albert Michallon	X	Grenoble	France	1968
Kōgorō Uemura	XI	Sapporo	Japan	1972
Bruno Kreisky	XII	Innsbruck	Austria	1976
Ron MacKenzie; Rev. J. Bernard Fell	XIII	Lake Placid	United States	1980
Branko Mikulić	XIV	Sarajevo	Yugoslavia	1984
Frank King	XV	Calgary	Canada	1988
Jean-Claude Killy; Michel Barnier	XVI	Albertville	France	1992
Gerhard Heiberg	XVII	Lillehammer	Norway	1994
Eishiro Saito	XVIII	Nagano	Japan	1998
Robert H. Garff; Frank Joklik; Mitt Romney	XIX	Salt Lake City	United States	2002
Valentino Castellani	XX	Turin	Italy	2006
John Furlong	XXI	Vancouver	Canada	2010
Dmitry Chernyshenko	XXII	Sochi	Russia	2014
Kim Jin-sun; Cho Yang-ho; Lee Hee-beom	XXIII	Pyeongchang	South Korea	2018
Guo Jinlong; Cai Qi	XXIV	Beijing	China	2022
Giovanni Malagò	XXV	Milan and Cortina d'Ampezzo	Italy	2026
Edgar Grospiron	XXVI	French Alps	France	2030
Fraser Bullock	XXVII	Utah	United States	2034

=== Summer Youth Olympic Games ===
President	Game	Host city	Host country	Year
Ng Ser Miang	I	Singapore	Singapore	2010
Li Xueyong	II	Nanjing	China	2014
Gerardo Werthein	III	Buenos Aires	Argentina	2018
Mamadou Ndiaye	IV	Dakar	Senegal	2026

=== Winter Youth Olympic Games ===
President	Game	Host city	Host country	Year
Richard Rubatscher	I	Innsbruck	Austria	2012
Siri Hatlen	II	Lillehammer	Norway	2016
Patrick Baumann; Ira Logan; Virginie Faivre	III	Lausanne	Switzerland	2020
Choi Moon-soon; Choi Jong-gu	IV	Gangwon	South Korea	2024
Manuela Di Centa	V	Dolomites and Valtellina	Italy	2028

== Notable presidents ==
Presidents of the Olympic Organising Committee have been business executives, athletes, bureaucrats, politicians, and more. Some have gone on to or have served in other high offices:

- Constantine I of Greece, who headed the organising committee for the 1896 Summer Olympics, later served as the King of Greece.
- Pierre de Coubertin, who headed the organising committees for the 1900 and 1924 Summer Olympics as well as the 1924 Winter Olympics, was the founder of the modern Olympic movement and International Olympic Committee. He served as President of the International Olympic Committee from 1896 to 1925.
- David R. Francis, who headed the organising committee for the 1904 Summer Olympics, served as Governor of Missouri before heading the organising committee. He later briefly served as the United States Ambassador to Russia.
- Joseph Goebbels, who headed the organising committees for the 1936 Winter Olympics and 1936 Summer Olympics, served as Chancellor of Germany for one day in 1945 before committing suicide.
- Haakon VII, who headed the organising committee for the 1952 Winter Olympics, also served as the King of Norway. His daughter, Princess Astrid, Mrs. Ferner, also served as the president of the organising committee, becoming the first woman to ever hold the title (Gianna Angelopoulos-Daskalaki would do the same in 2004).
- Giulio Andreotti, who headed the organising committee for the 1960 Summer Olympics, later served as the Prime Minister of Italy.
- Bruno Kreisky, who headed the organising committee for the 1964 Winter Olympics, later served as the Chancellor of Austria.
- Konstantin Chernenko was the leader of the Soviet Union while also being the president of the 1980 Summer Olympics organising committee.
- Branko Mikulić, who headed the organising committee for the 1984 Winter Olympics, later served as the Prime Minister of Yugoslavia.
- Peter Ueberroth, who headed the organising committee for the 1984 Summer Olympics in Los Angeles, went on to serve as the Commissioner of Baseball from 1984 to 1989.
- Roh Tae-woo, who headed the organising committee for the 1988 Summer Olympics, later served as the President of South Korea.
- Michel Barnier, who headed of the organising committee for the 1992 Winter Olympics in Albertville, served as the Prime Minister of France in 2024.
- Following the 2002 Winter Olympics in Salt Lake City, Mitt Romney ran for Governor of Massachusetts and was elected Governor with nearly 50% of the vote in the election. He served one term as governor. He was the Republican nominee for President of the United States in the 2012 Presidential Election but lost to then-incumbent President Barack Obama. Sixteen years after the Winter Olympics, Romney would go on to be elected Senator for the state of Utah following the 2018 midterm elections.
- Sebastian Coe, who headed the organising committee for the 2012 Summer Olympics in London, is now serving as the President of the International Association of Athletics Federations. He also served as the Chairman of the British Olympic Association from 2012 to 2016.
- Yoshirō Mori, who headed the organising committee for the 2020 Summer Olympics in Tokyo until 2021, previously served as Prime Minister of Japan from 2000 to 2001.
