= Cho Yang-ho =

South Korean businessman (1949–2019)

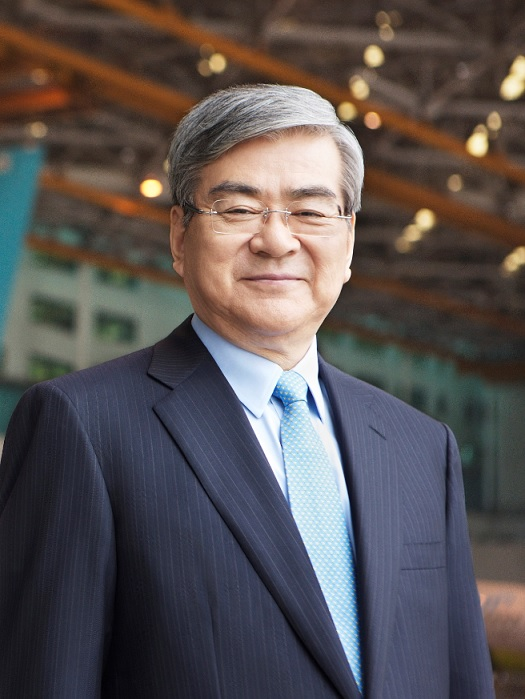

President of the PyeongChang Organizing Committee for the 2018 Olympic & Paralympic Winter Games
- In office July 31, 2014 – May 3, 2016
- IOC President: Thomas Bach
- Preceded by: Kim Jin-sun
- Succeeded by: Lee Hee-beom

Chair of the PyeongChang Organizing Committee for the 2018 Olympic & Paralympic Winter Games
- In office July 31, 2014 – May 3, 2016; Chair of the PyeongChang bid: September 14, 2009 – October 5, 2011
- Preceded by: Kim Jin-sun
- Succeeded by: Lee Hee-beom

Personal details
- Born: 8 March 1949 Seoul, South Korea
- Died: 8 April 2019 (aged 70) Los Angeles, California, U.S.
- Children: 3

Korean name
- Hangul: 조양호
- Hanja: 趙亮鎬
- RR: Jo Yangho
- MR: Cho Yangho

Cho Yang-ho (Korean: 조양호; sometimes written Y. H. Cho; 8 March 1949 – 8 April 2019) was a South Korean businessman who was the chairman and chief executive officer of Korean Air and chairman of the Hanjin Group.

== Career ==
Born in Seoul, Cho received a bachelor's degree in industrial engineering from Inha University in 1975, an MBA from the University of Southern California in 1979, and a doctoral degree in business administration from Inha University in 1988. Additionally in 1998, he received an honorary doctorate degree in aviation business administration from Embry-Riddle Aeronautical University, Florida.

Cho was the chairman of the Hanjin Group, a transportation conglomerate. He was named to this post in February 2003 after having served as the Group's vice chairman since 1996. He was also the Director and CEO of various subsidiary companies including Hanjin Shipping, Korea Airport Service (KAS), JungSeok Enterprise Co. and Hanjin Information Systems & Telecommunications (HIST).

Cho was elected vice-chairman of The Federation of Korean Industries (FKI) in 1996, and held the title of honorary consul-general to Ireland in South Korea from 1995 until his death in 2019. He was named Chairman of the Korea-French High Level Businessmen's Club in October 2000 and also served on the Board of Governors for the International Air Transport Association (IATA) after being elected in May 2001. In addition, he became chairman of the Korea-Canada Business Council in 1993 and, from 2004 to 2019, served as Chairman of the Korea Defense Industry Association. Cho formerly sat on the University of Southern California (USC) Board of Trustees for a span beginning in 1997. In addition, he served as the chairman of the board of directors at both Inha and Hankuk Aviation University.

In 2000, he was convicted of tax evasion.

He was appointed the head of the Pyeong Chang 2018 Bid Committee, which won the bid to host the Olympic and Paralympic Winter Games in 2018. He later served as the president and CEO of the Pyeong Chang 2018 Organizing Committee from 2014 to 2016.

In May 2018, a protest rally called for Cho to step down as chairman of Korean Air. In March 2019, under the support of NPS, he was ousted from the board by shareholders amid various scandals involving him and his family members, including the nut rage incident. This was the first time that a founding member of a major South Korean family was forced from the board and it is considered to have been a victory for those working to restrict the powers of the chaebols.

== Personal life and death ==
Cho was the son of Cho Choong-hoon, the founder of Hanjin Group and head of Korean Air.

Cho was married, with a son, Cho Won-tae, and two daughters: Cho Seung-yeon (also known as Heather Cho and formerly Cho Hyeon-ah) and Cho Hyeon-min (also known as Emily Cho). All three children are graduates of the University of Southern California. His 9th great grandfather, Jo Tae-chae, is a Right State Councilor (known as Uuijeong (우의정)) during the reign of King Sukjong.

On 8 April 2019, Cho died at a hospital in Los Angeles County, California, US, at the age of 70. He had been at the hospital since December 2018 receiving treatment for pulmonary fibrosis.

== Awards ==
- April 2005: Order of the Polar Star (highest civilian honor awarded by Mongolia to foreign citizens)
- October 2005: Moran Medal of the Order of Civil Merit (South Korea)
- January 2012: Grand Order of Mugunghwa (South Korea)
- November 2015: Grand Officier in the Legion of Honour (France)

Preceded by (South Korea) Kim Jin-sun	President of Organizing Committee for 2018 Winter Olympics; 2014–2016	Succeeded by (South Korea) Lee Hee-beom
