= List of recipients of the Paralympic Order =

The following is a list of recipients of the Paralympic Order.

The Paralympic Order is the highest award of the Paralympic Movement, since 1994. The recipients get a medal with the IPC logo on it. The Paralympic Order is awarded to individuals for particularly distinguished contribution to the Paralympic Movement.

Before 2003, the Paralympic Order was given out in three categories: Gold, Silver and Bronze.

== Recipients ==
=== 1990s ===
Year	Name	Title	NPC	Lvl.
1994	Gerhard Heiberg	President of the Lillehammer 1994 Winter Olympic Games Organizing Committee and (LOCOG) Lillehammer 1994 Paralympic Games Organizing Committee (LPOC)	Norway	
1994	John Magdal	Managing director of LPOC	Norway	
1994	Lill-Unni Østern	Office Manager of LPOC	Norway	
1994	Rolf Jenssen	Venues Consultant of LPOC	Norway	
1996	Juan Antonio Samaranch	President of the International Olympic Committee IOC	Spain	
1996	Andrew Fleming	President of the Atlanta 1996 Paralympic Games Organizing Committee (APOC)	United States	Gold medal
1998	Goro Yoshimura	President of the Nagano 1998 Paralympic Games Organizing Committee (NAPOC)	Japan	
1998	Tasuku Tsukada	Mayor of Nagano	Japan	
1998	Yoshifumi Ihara	Deputy Secretary General of NAPOC	Japan	
1999	Joan Scruton	Past Secretary General of the International Stoke Mandeville Wheelchair Sports Federation (ISMWSF)	Great Britain	

=== 2000s ===
Year	Name	Title	NPC	Lvl.
2000	John Grant	President of the Sydney 2000 Paralympic Games Organizing Committee (SPOC)	Australia	
2001	Robert Steadward	First President of the International Paralympic Committee (IPC)	Canada	
2001	Michael Riding	Past IPC Medical Officer		
2001	André Auberger	Past IPC Treasurer		
2001	Elisabeth Dendy	Past President of the Cerebral Palsy International Sports and Recreation Association (CPISRA)	Great Britain	
2001	Lina Faria	Past President of CPISRA		
2001	Enrique Sanz	Past President of the International Blind Sports Federation (IBSA)		
2001	Guillermo Cabezas	Past President of the International Sports Organization for the Disabled (ISOD)		
2001	Harry Fang	Founding Father of the Far East and South Pacific Games for the Disabled (FESPIC)	China	
2001	Walter Tröger	International Olympic Committee (IOC) Delegate Member for Disabled Sport		
2001	George Dunstan	Past International Paralympic Committee (IPC) Regional Representative South Pacific	Australia	
2001	Gilbert Felli	IOC Sports Director		
2002	Bob Garff	Chairman of the Board of Trustees, Salt Lake 2002 Organizing Committee (SLOC)		Gold medal
2002	Mitt Romney	Chief executive Officer and President of SLOC	United States	Gold medal
2002	Fraser Bullock	Executive Vice-President and Chief Operating Officer of SLOC	United States	Gold medal
2002	Bob McCullough	Past president of the International Stoke Mandeville Wheelchair Sports Federation (ISMWSF)	Australia	Silver medal
2002	Gudrun Doll-Tepper	Past IPC chairperson of the science committee and president of the International Council of Sport Science and Physical Education (ICSSPE)		Silver medal
2002	Gertrude Krombholz	Past IPC chairperson Wheelchair Dance Sport		Silver medal
2002	Hans Lindström	Past IPC technical officer and regional representative Europe		Silver medal
2003	Yasuhiro Hatsuyama	Former IPC Executive Committee member and East Asia Representative		
2003	Colin Rains	President of the Cerebral Palsy International Sports and Recreation Association (CPISRA)		
2003	Hector Ramirez	Past President of the Pan American Wheelchair Sport Federation, President of the Argentine Paralympic Committee (COPAR)		
2003	Donald Royer	President of the Canadian Wheelchair Sports Association		
2003	Jean Stone	Technical Secretary to the IPC Sports Council, Women in Sport Committee		
2003	Carl Wang	Chairperson of the Norwegian Sports Organization for the Disabled and President of the European Paralympic Committee	Norway	
2003	Xavier Gonzalez	Paralympic Games Liaison Director and interim COO		
2004	Gianna Angelopoulos-Daskalaki	President of the Athens Organizing Committee for the Olympic Games (ATHOC)	Greece	
2004	Ioannis Spanudakis	Managing director of ATHOC		
2004	Ioanna Karyofylli	General Manager of ATHOC		
2004	Ludwig Guttmann	Pioneer of sport for persons with a disability and founder of the Paralympic Movement	Germany	
2004	Organizacion Nacional de Ciegos (ONCE)	For their involvement in the Barcelona 1992 Paralympic Games, their support of the Paralympic Movement in Spain and their contributions to the International Blind Sports Federation (IBSA)	Spain	
2005	Jack Benedick	Former athlete; World Championship and Paralympic Games Technical Delegate. Chairperson of IPC Alpine Skiing. Board of Directors of the US Ski and Snowboard Association		
2005	Birgitta Blomquist	Past representative to a variety of sport federations (Swimming Committee Chairperson 1984-1992 and Wintersport Committee Chairperson 1986–1992)		
2005	Chris Cohen	Chairperson of the IPC Athletics Executive Committee		
2005	Leen Coudenys	IPC Executive Assistant		
2005	Ian Harrison, MBE	President of the International Foundation for Disabled Sailing (IFDS)		
2005	Robert Jackson	Past director, vice-president and president of the International Stoke Mandeville Games Federation from 1972 until 1984		
2005	Carol Mushett	Past IPC Technical Officer of the IPC Executive Committee		
2005	Enrique Perez	Past President of the International Blind Sports Federation (IBSA) and President of the World Blind Union		
2005	Deng Pufang	President of the National Paralympic Committee of China, the China Disabled Persons’ Federation (CDPF) and Executive President of the Beijing 2008 Organizing Committee (BOCOG)	China	
2005	Albert Tricot	Founder of the Belgian Paralympic Committee		
2005	Whang Youn Dai	Vice-president of the Korea Sports Association for the Disabled (KOSAD) and founder of the ‘Whang Youn Dai Prize’		
2006	York Chow	Member of the international task force that formed the International Paralympic Committee (IPC) in 1989; former Vice President Policy and Planning on the IPC Executive Committee/Governing Board until 2005		
2006	Giuseppe Ferrari	Secretary General of the Organizing Committee for the Paralympic Winter Games of Torino 2006 (ComParTo)		
2006	Björn Hedman	Current member of the IPC Medical and Anti-Doping Committee; IPC Medical Officer and member of the IPC Executive Committee/Governing Board (2001 to 2005)		
2006	Fred Jansen	Current Chairperson of the IPC Sports Council; former member of the IPC Executive Committee/Governing Board (1998 to 2005). Co-opted as a member of the IPC GB in March 2006		
2006	Tiziana Nasi	President of the Organizing Committee for the Paralympic Winter Games of Torino 2006 (ComParTo)		
2006	Juan Palau	Former President of the International Sports Organisation for the Disabled (ISOD) and IOSD Representative on the IPC Executive Committee/Governing Board from (1993 to 2005)		
2006	Bob Price	Former Chairperson of the British Paralympic Association. President of the European Paralympic Committee (2001 to 2005) and former member of the IPC Executive Committee/ Governing Board (2001 to 2005)		
2006	François Terranova	Former Chairperson of the Paralympic Games Liaison Committee since 1997; former Vice President of Paralympic Games on the IPC Executive Committee/Governing Board (1997 to 2005)		
2006	Cesare Vaciago	Chief executive Officer of the Organizing Committee for the XX Olympic Winter Games (TOROC)		
2007	Silas Chiang	Former Secretary General of the Hong Kong Disabled Sports Association and involved in the organization of the FESPIC Games for over 25 years		
2007	Spyros Stavrianopoulos	First president of the Hellenic Paralympic Committee and promoter of sports for persons with a disability in Greece.		
2008	Liu Qi	Former mayor of Beijing, resident of the Beijing 2008 Organizing Committee (BOCOG), Member of the Political Bureau of the CPC Central Committee, Secretary of the CPC Beijing Committee		
2008	Hui Liangyu	Vice Premier of the State Council, Member of the Political Bureau of the CPC Central Committee		
2008	Liu Yandong	Vice-president of BOCOG, Member of the Political Bureau of the CPC Central Committee, State Councilor		
2008	Chen Zhili	Vice-president of BOCOG, Vice Chairperson of the Standing Committee of the National People's Congress		
2008	Deng Pufang	President of the China Disabled Persons’ Federation (CDPF), Executive President of BOCOG, Vice Chairperson of the National Committee of the Chinese People's Political Consultative Conference (CPPCC)		
2008	Liu Peng	Executive President of BOCOG, Minister of the General Administration of Sport of China, President of the Chinese Olympic Committee		
2008	Guo Jinlong	Mayor of Beijing, Executive President of BOCOG	China	
2008	Tang Xiaoquan	President of the Executive Board and Vice President of the China Disabled Persons’ Federation, Executive Vice President of BOCOG		
2008	Zhao Wenshi	Deputy of Paralympic Games Command Center, Vice Chairperson of CPPCC Beijing Committee		
2008	Manolo Romero	Managing director of Olympic Broadcasting Services (OBS)		
2008	Anne Ebbs	Former Secretary General of the Paralympic Council of Ireland (PCI)		
2009	Valeriy Sushkevych	President of the National Paralympic Committee of Ukraine		
2009	Maura Strange	Executive Director and Secretary General of the International Wheelchair and Amputee Sports Federation (IWAS)		
2009	Pol Wautermartens	Former Chairperson of the IPC Powerlifting Sport Technical Committee		
2009	Tony Sainsbury	Former Vice-President of IWBF Europe and five-time Chef de Mission of the British Team for the Paralympics		
2009	Jerry Johnston	Founder of the Canadian Association for Disabled Skiing (CADS)		
2009	Jens Bromann	Former President of the International Blind Sports Federation (IBSA)		
2009	Bob Fisher	Former Chairperson of the Football 7-a-Side Committee of the Cerebral Palsy International Sports and Recreation Association (CPISRA)		

=== 2010s ===
While Paralympic Orders were presented to Dmitry Chernyshenko, President of Sochi 2014 Organising Committee, Dmitry Kozak, Prime Minister of Russia, Oleg Syromolotov, Chief of Interagency Security Command Centre Sochi 2014, and Alexander Gorovoy, Chief of Interagency Security Command Centre Sochi 2014 following their roles in the Sochi 2014 Paralympic Winter Games, the IPC withdrew their awards in March 2022 following the Russian invasion of Ukraine.

Year	Name	Title	NPC
2010	John Furlong	CEO of the Vancouver 2010 Organizing Committee (VANOC)	
2010	Dena Coward	VANOC Paralympic Games Director	
2010	Jack Poole	VANOC Chairman of the Board of Directors (posthumous award)	
2010	Rusty Goepel	VANOC Chairman of the Board of Directors	
2011	Matthias Berg	Seven-time Paralympian. Member of the National Paralympic Committee of Germany (2011).	
2011	Luca Pancalli	President of the National Paralympic Committee of Italy (2011). Eight-time Paralympian. Commissioner of the Italian Football Federation (2011).	
2011	Nabil Salem	Former president of the National Paralympic Committee of Egypt; former president of the African Paralympic Committee; former vice president of the International Paralympic Committee.	
2011	Randy Snow	Three-time Paralympian and first Paralympian to be inducted into the United States Olympic Hall of Fame (2004).	
2012	Sebastian Coe	Chair of London Organising Committee of the Olympic and Paralympic Games (LOCOG)	
2012	Paul Deighton	CEO of LOCOG	
2012	Chris Holmes	Director of Paralmypic Integration of LOCOG	
2012	Boris Johnson	Mayor of London during the 2012 Summer Paralympics.	
2012	Keith Mills	Deputy chair of LOCOG	
2013	Bob Balk	Former Chairman of the IPC Athletes’ Council	
2013	Michael Barredo	Former president of International Blind Sports Federation	Philippines
2013	Duncan Campbell	Wheelchair rugby inventor	
2013	Jonquil Solt	Former chairwoman of the Equestrian Committee of the International Paralympic Committee	
2014	Vladimir Lukin	President of Russia Paralympic Committee	
2014	Anatoly Pakhomov	Mayor of Sochi	
2014	Alexander Tkachov	Governor of Krasnodar Krai	
2015	Dr. Axel Bolsinger	Ophthalmologist for the National Paralympic Committee Germany	
2015	Georgios Fountoulakis	President of Hellenic Paralympic Committee	
2015	Sylvana Mestre	Former chairwoman of the alpine skiing IPC committee	
2016	The citizens of Rio de Janeiro and Brazil	For "outstanding support" of the 2016 Summer Paralympics.	Brazil
2016	The people of the Rio de Janeiro government		
2016	The volunteers and staff of the 2016 Summer Olympics		
2017	Ann Cody		United States
2017	Sir Philip Craven		United Kingdom
2017	Paul DePace		United States
2017	Gerard Masson		France
2017	Karl Vilhelm Nielsen		Denmark
2017	Jacques Rogge		Belgium
2017	Miguel Sagarra		Spain
2018	Patrick Jarvis		Canada
2018	Lee Hee-beom		South Korea
2018	Choi Moon-soon		South Korea
2018	Yeo Hyungkoo		South Korea
2018	Kim Jooho		South Korea
2018	Kim Jaeyoul		South Korea
2018	Kim Kihong		South Korea
2019	Jose Luis Campo		
2019	Greg Hartung		Australia
2019	Alan Dickson		
2019	Rudi van den Abbeele		
2019	Bassam Qasrawi		
2019	Mahmoud Khosravi Vafa		
2019	Georg Schlachtenberger		

=== 2020s ===
Year	Name	Title	NPC
2021	Paul Bird	President of the Oceania Paralympic Committee	
2021	Rita van Driel	IPC Governing Board Member at Large	
2021	Greg Nugent	London 2012 Paralympic Games marketer and filmmaker behind the Paralympic documentary Rising Phoenix	
2021	Yasushi Yamawaki	Vice President, Tokyo 2020 Organising Committee and IPC Governing Board Member at Large	
2023	David Hadfield	Former President of World Boccia	
2023	Jin-owan Jung	President of the Korean Paralympic Committee	
2023	Jorge Ochoa	President of NPC El Salvador	
2025	Tim Reddish CBE	Former Chair of the British Paralympic Association, IPC Governing Board Member at Large	
2025	Prof. Anne Hart	Former Chair of the IPC Classification Committee	
2025	Duane Kale	IPC Vice President	

== See also ==
- List of recipients of the Olympic Order
