= 2000 Summer Olympics closing ceremony =

- Part of 2000 Summer Olympics
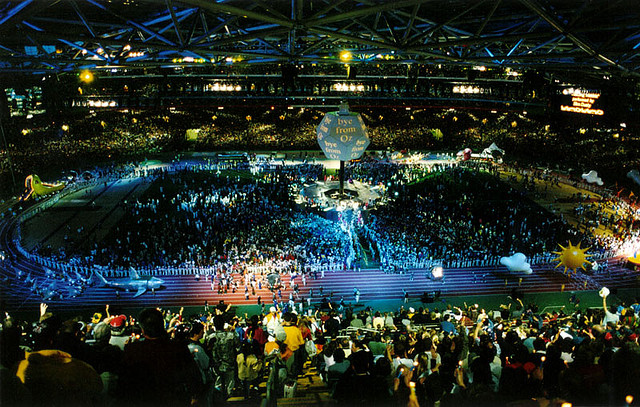
- Date: 1 October 2000
- Time: 19:00 to 22:01 AEDT (UTC+11)
- Venue: Stadium Australia
- Location: Sydney, New South Wales, Australia; 33°50′50″S 151°03′48″E
- Filmed by: Sydney Olympic Broadcasting Organisation
- Participants: 114,714 in attendance
- Footage: Sydney 2000 Closing Ceremony - Full Length on YouTube

The 2000 Summer Olympics closing ceremony was held on 1 October 2000 in Stadium Australia. As with the opening ceremony, the closing ceremony was directed by Ric Birch as director of ceremonies while David Atkins was the artistic director and producer. The closing ceremony was attended by 114,714 people which, until the 2024 Summer Olympics opening ceremony, was the largest attendance in modern Olympic history. Called "Let's Party", the ceremony celebrated Australiana; Australian cultural celebrities, icons, media, and music, with floats designed in the style of Reg Mombassa. Around 2.4 billion watched the telecast of the closing ceremony.

Then IOC president Juan Antonio Samaranch declared in his concluding remarks (and his last remarks at an Olympic Games) that the 2000 Olympic games were the "best Summer Olympics ever".

== Attending heads of state and heads of government ==
- IOC
  - IOC President Juan Antonio Samaranch and Members of the International Olympic Committee

Host nation

- Australia
  - Governor-General of Australia William Deane and wife Helen Deane
  - Prime Minister of Australia John Howard and wife Janette Howard
  - Premier of New South Wales Bob Carr
  - SOCOG President Michael Knight
  - Lord Mayor of Sydney Frank Sartor

Next Host nation

- Greece
  - Dimitris Avramopoulos Mayor of Athens
  - Gianna Angelopoulos-Daskalaki President of the Athens Organizing Committee for the Olympic Games

Foreign dignitaries

- United States
  - Henry Kissinger former Secretary of State

== Segments ==
=== Prelude ===
Compared to the opening ceremony, the stadium showed the track and field ground as is. The main stage was called the Geodome Stage and was in the center of the stadium. The Prelude segment was hosted by Roy and HG.

Just before the closing ceremony, the Men's Marathon finished in Stadium Australia. Ethiopian runner Gezahegne Abera won the Gold, Kenya's Erick Wainaina took the silver, while Gezahegne's countryman Tesfaye Tola took bronze.

=== Welcome & Countdown ===
Just before the Countdown, a slapstick skit was performed just before the countdown showing what could have gone wrong in the opening ceremony. A groundskeeper loses control of his buggy and causes havoc over the stadium and the pomp and ceremony. In one scene, Birch appears on a bike with an inflatable kangaroo that was featured in the handover segment of the 1996 closing ceremony. He even runs into the mascots of the games in the stadium in their only appearance in the ceremony. Finally his vehicle is dismantled in a comedic way.

A recording of the countdown composed by Richard Mills performed by Sydney Symphony Orchestra that was played before the beginning of the Opening Ceremony played again for the closing ceremony. The large screens counted down from 60 to 1. Starting at 23, footage from previous games appeared. On 0, footage of fireworks was shown followed by an image of a Ken Done drawing with the phrase "Let's Party!"

=== Protocol Section ===
==== My Island Home ====
After a brief fanfare composed by David Stanhope, Christine Anu performed with Torres Strait Island dancers her rendition of the Warumpi Band's song "My Island Home" written by Neil Murray. She performed on the Geodome Stage, with several Aboriginal dancers atop the stage, around which several hundred kids holding umbrellas and lampboxes created images of Aboriginal Dreamtime. The song version who was performed was the recently released Earth Beat mix, which is a rerecorded version who had the some parts of the lyrics altered so to evoke that the island sung about is Australia itself. Near the end of the song, Anu was hoisted on part of the stage, which was folded into a giant 8-sided octagonal figure called The Geode, which had the globe projected on it. Audience members were encouraged to wave their flashlights.

==== Entrance of the Athletes ====
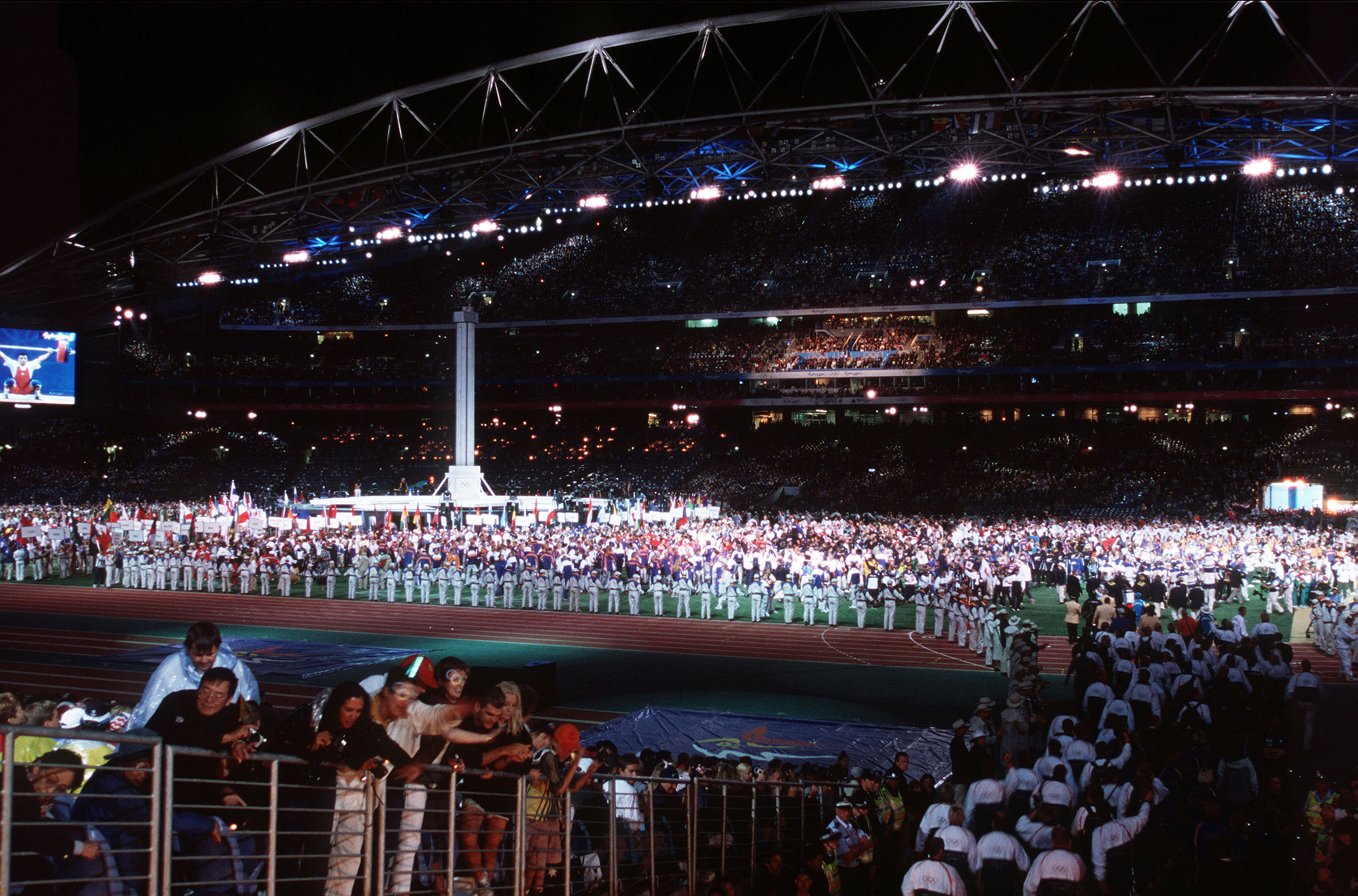
Athletes arrive into the stadium

The flags from all countries entered with their flag bearers before placing their flags on the Geode stage. Then, after the flags all entered, athletes ran in from all entrances onto the field, while the fanfare "Olympic Fireworks" by David Stanhope and orchestral piece "Journey of Angels" by Chong Lim played. Savage Garden performed their hit song "Affirmation" on the Geode stage while wearing indigenous flag t-shirts. The Geode stage was projected different words relating to what people might affirm about their beliefs. One of the words included Sydney's famous graffiti, Eternity.

The last time Australia hosted the Olympic Games in 1956, a young man from Melbourne, John Ian Wing, suggested that during the closing ceremony, instead of marching as separate teams, behind their national flags, the athletes mingled together as they paraded into and around the arena for a final appearance before the spectators. It was implemented then and has been an Olympic tradition that has been followed ever since.

==== Anthems ====
Children from both the Millennium Choir of the Greek Orthodox Archdiocese of Australia and Sing 2001 Choir stepped and spread themselves on the Geode stage in white and cream attires. The Millennium Children's Choir performed "Hymn to Liberty", as the National Anthem of Greece, conducted by George Ellis .

Two Greek flags were raised; one as protocol to recognise the birthplace of the Olympic Games, and the other to recognise Athens as the next host city. Afterwards, with the raising of the Australian flag the Sing 2001 Children's Choir performed "Advance Australia Fair", the national anthem of Australia, conducted by George Torbay.

- (Greece) Hymn to Liberty - Music by Nikolaos Mantzaros, Lyrics by Dionysios Solomos
- The National Anthem of Australia – Music & Lyrics by Peter Dodds McCormick

==== Closing Addresses ====
President of the Sydney Organising Committee for the Olympic Games (SOCOG), Michael Knight, made a closing address thanking the volunteers, the organising committee and the people of the City of Sydney. He stated:

"All Australians are entitled to feel proud of our athletes, our country and themselves for what our nation has achieved during this period."

As he was introducing Juan Antonio Samaranch, he noted that this would be his last Olympics as President of the International Olympic Committee (IOC), and would be a special night for him, although his experience of the games came amid personal tragedy.

Juan Antonio Samaranch gave a speech echoing Knight's thanks to all those who helped organised the games. He then declared:

"These are my last Games as President of the International Olympic Committee. They could not have been better. Therefore, I am proud and happy to proclaim that you have presented to the world, the best Olympic Games ever."

Subsequent Summer Olympics held in Athens, Beijing and London have been described by Samaranch's successor Jacques Rogge as "unforgettable, dream Games", "truly exceptional" and "happy and glorious games" respectively – the practice of declaring games the "best ever" having been retired after the 2000 Games.

Samaranch then awarded the on behalf of the IOC the Gold Olympic Order to both Michael Knight, as an expression of gratitude for a perfect organisation, and John Coates, president of the Australian Olympic Committee for fulfilling the promise of making these games the athletes games. In addition, he also gave on behalf of the IOC, the Olympic Cup to the people of Sydney for their enthusiastic and unpartisan support of athletes from all countries.

Samaranch then announced the newly elected members of the International Olympic Committee Athletes' Commission:

- Sergei Bubka (athletics, Ukraine)
- Charmaine Crooks (athletics, Canada)
- Bob Ctvrtlik (volleyball, United States of America)
- Manuel Estiarte (water polo, Spain)
- Susan O'Neill (swimming, Australia)
- Alexander Popov (swimming, Russian Federation)
- Jan Železný (athletics, Czech Republic)
- Roland Baar (rowing, Germany)

==== Welcome Home, Olympics: Athens 2004 ====
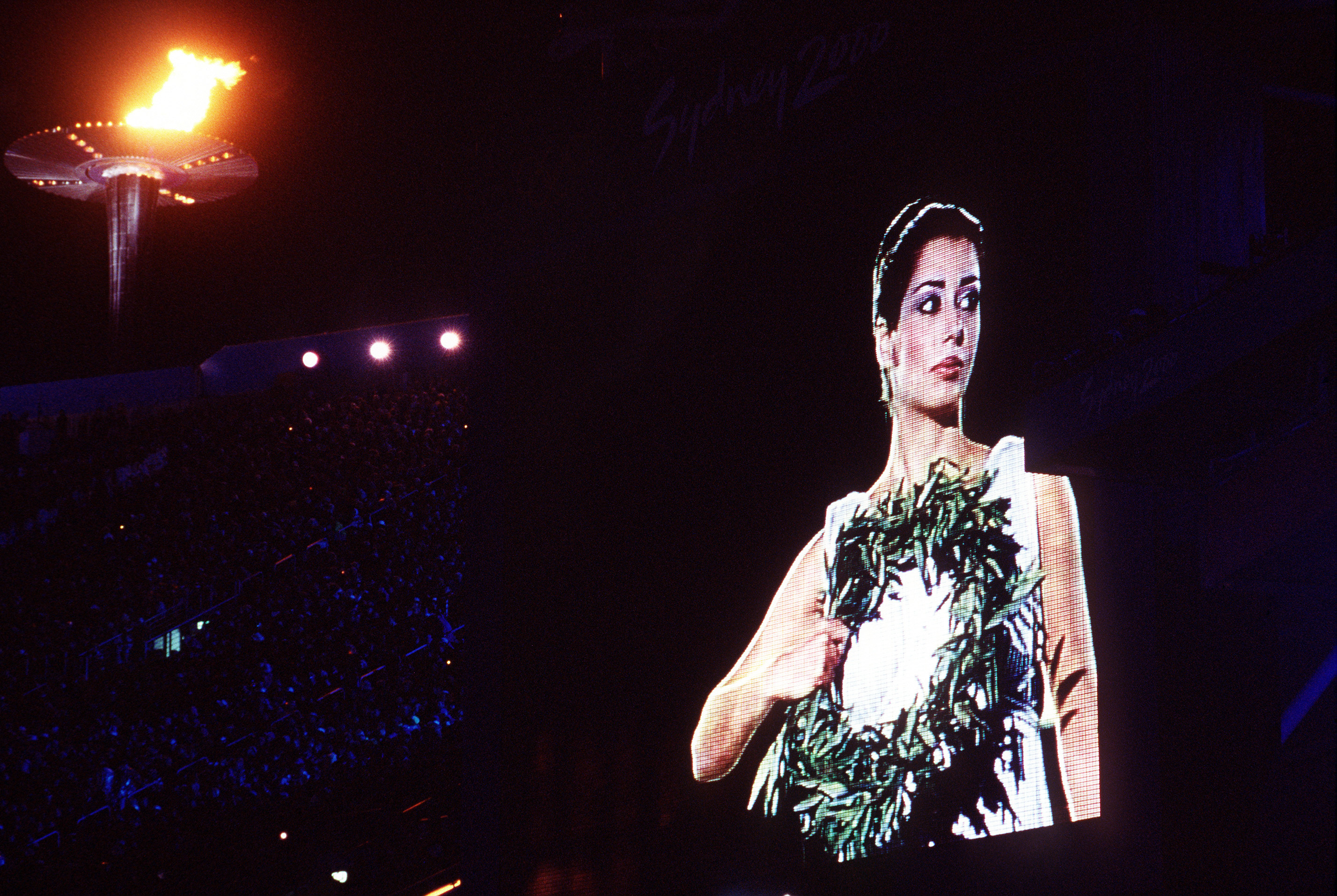
A priestess performing a rite

This segment was conceptualised, crafted, produced and directed by Greek artist Vangelis. Given the importance of returning the Games to their spiritual home, Vangelis decided to include the Antwerp Ceremony (the flag handover ceremony). As a feature during the Antwerp Ceremony, Mayor of Athens Dimitris Avramopoulos and Gianna Angelopoulos-Daskalaki, President of the Athens 2004 Olympic Games Committee entered the main stage. They entered paired with the priestesses of Olympia, as a sign of protection, as they were responsible for receiving the Olympic flag and taking the Games back to their spiritual home. After the flag was passed to the Greek delegates, they performed a special sending ritual as an Athens cultural presentation. After their performance, the Lord Mayor of Sydney, Frank Sartor arrives with the Seoul Olympic flag to begin the ceremony. He hands it to Samaranch, who hands it over to Avramopoulos. After the ceremony, the priestesses look around the flag, took the flag off its pole, threw laurel olive branches on top and carried the flag out of the stadium to Athens. The New York Times said that this was a moment of contrast between the approach of the two host cities to the Olympic Games.

Samaranch then officially called the games to its close, calling upon the youth of the world in four years to assemble in Athens, Greece - "the birthplace of Olympism". He ended his last Games as IOC president by saying thank you, and goodbye in the 4 languages he spoke (English, French, Spanish and Catalan).

==== Olympic Flag and Hymn ====
As the Olympic Flag raised during the opening ceremonies was lowered, on a separate stage near the flagpole, Australian soprano Yvonne Kenny performed a softer version of the Olympic Hymn in English, composed by Spyridon Samaras with lyrics by Kostis Palamas. Given it was sung in Greek in the opening ceremony, the Sydney Olympics was the first time the hymn was performed in both the IOC's preferred languages.

Chong Lim's "Journey of Angels" was then played. The final flag bearers were 8 young Australian sporting champions:

- Lori Munz (swimming; Commonwealth Games gold medalist and police officer)
- Melissa Rippon (water polo; bronze medalist in Beijing 2008 and London 2012)
- Anna Mcllwaine (diving; Diving Grand Prix gold medalist)
- Mathew Belcher (sailing; Olympic champion in London 2012 and Tokyo 2020; silver medalist in Rio 2016)
- Neil Dennis (rowing; World Rowing Championship representative)
- Stefan Szscurowski (rowing, Olympian at Athens 2004)
- Kerrie Meares (cycling; Anna Meares older sister)
- Mark Renshaw (cycling; Commonwealth Games gold medalist)

The Olympic flag was raised again at the upcoming Winter Olympics in Salt Lake City, Utah in the United States; the opening ceremony there took place on 8 February 2002.

==== Extinguishing the Olympic Flame - We'll Be One ====
‘We'll Be One’ was performed by Nikki Webster and the Sing 2001 Choir where she performed the song on a high platform underneath the Olympic Cauldron while wearing a white Greek dress. The song is about all of humanity coming together and becoming one. The Olympic Flame was then captured by an F-111 Jet of the Royal Australian Air Force which flew away from Olympic Park, representing the start of its long journey back to Athens. This effect was created by the aircraft jettisoning fuel from its tanks and igniting it with its afterburner, a manoeuvre called a dump-and-burn.

=== Let's Party! ===
The ceremony ended with an hour long party and dance mix, featuring well known culture of Australia icons.

Vanessa Amorosi arrived to perform a special extended remix of her hit Absolutely Everybody while dancers performed in sci-fi europop attire. Then ballroom dancers appears while Love Is in the Air was performed by John Paul Young. This was a reference to the Baz Luhrmann film Strictly Ballroom. Both performed on the Geode stage.

- "Absolutely Everybody (Sydney 2000 Version)" – Performed by Vanessa Amorosi
- "Love is in the Air (Olympic Samba Mix)" – Performed by John Paul Young

==== Heroes Medley ====
This medley was a collection of Australian rock songs, performed on two custom stages on the left and right of the stadium, as well as the Geode stage. The stages were designed and influenced by the work of Reg Mombassa, a key Mambo artist.

- "(Back on the) Terra Firma" – Performed by Phil & Tommy Emmanuel
- "What You Need" – Performed by INXS with Jon Stevens
- "Working Class Man" – Performed by Jimmy Barnes
- "Beds Are Burning" – Performed by Midnight Oil
- "Treaty" – Performed by Yothu Yindi

The Midnight Oil performance of Beds Are Burning was a second choice for organisers, as the slot was originally meant to be given to The Seekers to perform The Carnival is Over. However, lead vocalist Judith Durham broke her hip and was unable to perform on the night. The Seekers instead performed the song during the 2000 Paralympics closing ceremony a few weeks after, with Durham performing from a wheelchair.

==== Parade of Icons ====
This section of the dance mix began with a callback to the beginning of the opening ceremony, where the hero girl (Nikki Webster) took a day off at the beach. A large number of Surf Life Savers arrive with Kylie Minogue, playing the same character, but as an adult woman on a giant thong (Australian slang for a flip-flop) with a brief appearance of the 1989–2002 stinger for Triple J before singing her Intimate and Live Tour cover of the ABBA song "Dancing Queen" on the Geodome stage.

Then, surrounding athletes, the parade of icons began, showing pop cultural icons that demonstrated Australiana. Each celebrity arrived on a float which was decorated in character to the icon. The chosen icons were Greg Norman, Bananas in Pyjamas, Elle Macpherson, Paul Hogan as Crocodile Dundee, and the Drag Queens and the bus from The Adventures of Priscilla, Queen of the Desert. Nicole Kidman and Bjorn Again were both also invited to march in the icons parade, but neither could attend due to other commitments.

The remix track during the parade included samples from:

- "Theme from Jaws" - John Williams
- "Howzat" - Sherbet
- Bananas in Pyjamas theme song (Dance Mix)
- "Don't Call Me Baby" - Madison Avenue
- "Great Southern Land" - Icehouse
- "Shout" - Johnny O'Keefe
- "Finally" - Cece Peniston.

Minogue then performed along her crew from the Geodome her recently released single "On a Night Like This".

==== Bye from Oz, see ya in Athens ====
The show ended with the whole cast performing on the Geodome Stage with Men at Work the Australian classic, "Down Under". Finally to end off the 2000 Summer Olympics, Slim Dusty with a guitar in hand performed an acoustic version of "Waltzing Matilda" as a singalong with the cast, athletes, and crowd joining in. The Geode had projected two lines, Bye from Oz, and see ya in Athens. After the song, the last words spoken at the 2000 Summer Olympics were:

"Ladies and gentlemen, this concludes the Closing Ceremony of the Games of the XXVII Olympiad. On behalf of everyone here tonight, we congratulate the athletes. Thank you and goodnight. See you in Athens!"

=== Closing Night Harbour Spectacular ===
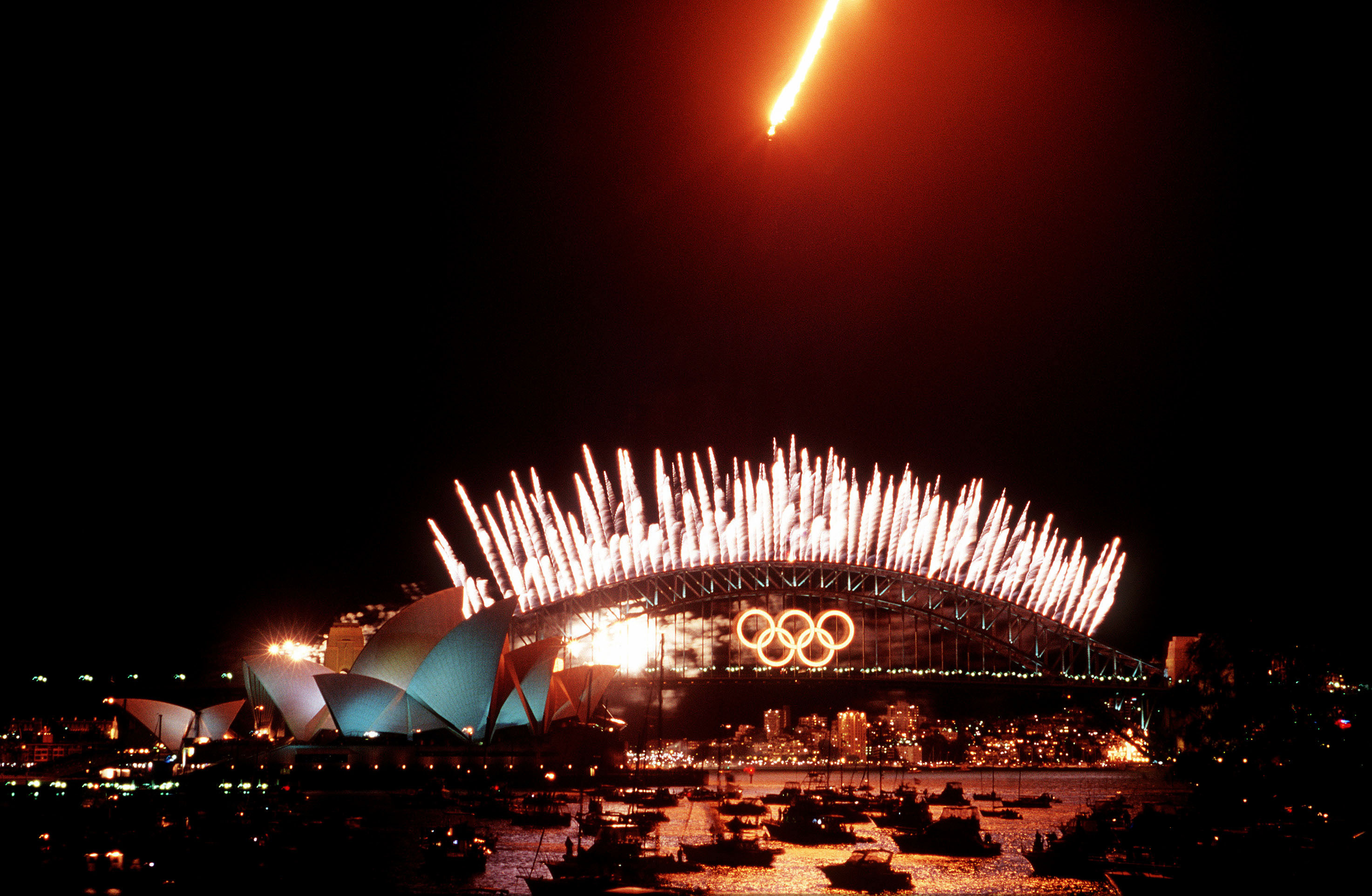
The spirit of the flame begins the Harbour Spectacular

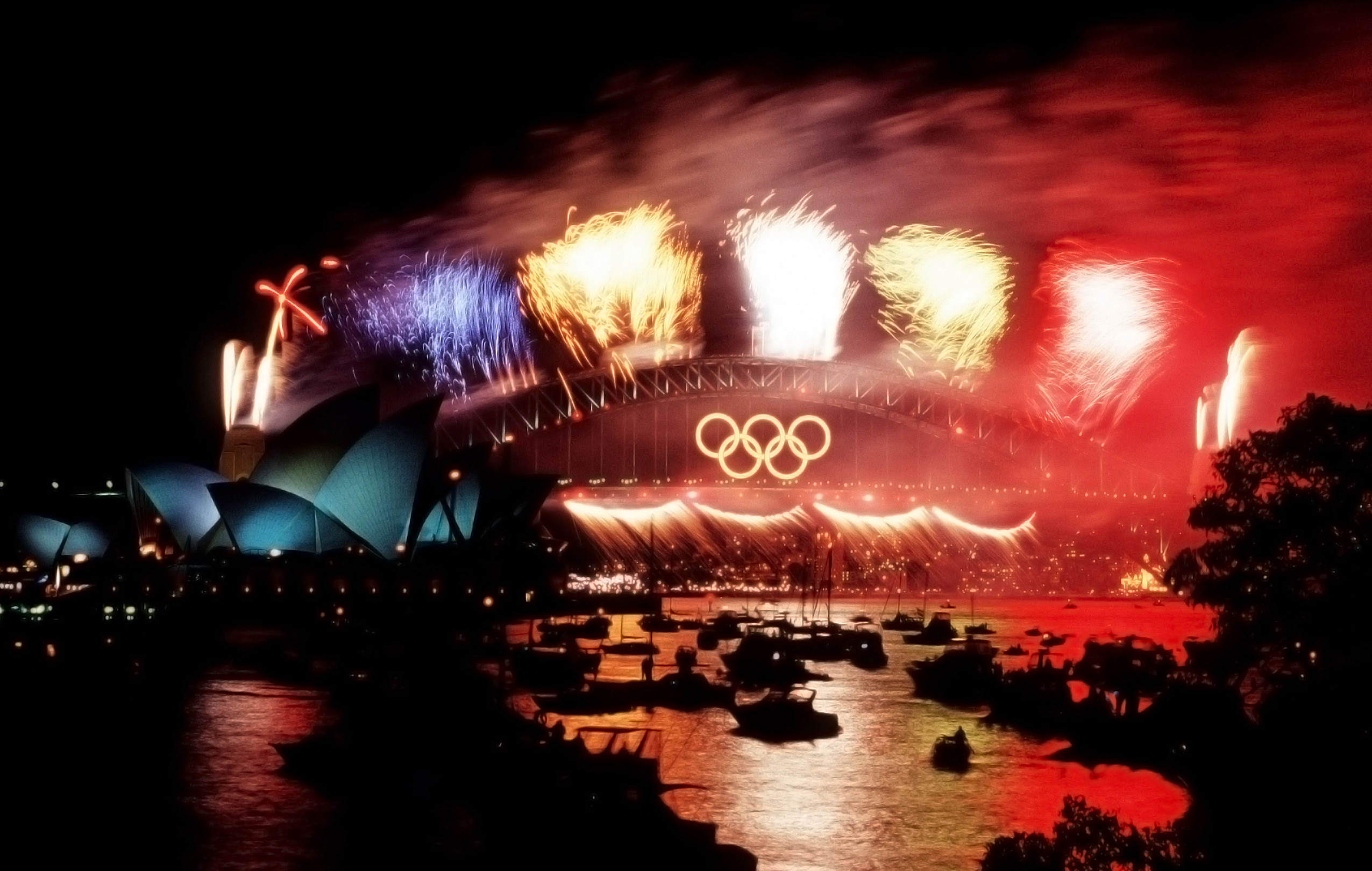
Olympic colours on the Sydney Harbour Bridge.

The "Closing Night Harbour Spectacular" marked the end of the ceremony, with a 25-minute fireworks display starting at Homebush Bay following the Parramatta River eastward, before reaching the Sydney Harbour Bridge. After the spirit of the flame (a F-111 from earlier with the Olympic flame) flew over the Harbour Bridge, the harbour erupts with fireworks. It was the largest fireworks display staged in the world at that time, and required the work of five different pyrotechnic companies, headed by Foti Pyrotechnics.

Soundtrack:

- Olympic Fireworks - David Stanhope
- Overture to Tannhäuser - Richard Wagner
- Arrivals: Movements I to V - Peewee Ferris
- Symphony of a Thousand - Gustav Mahler

== Legacy ==
A major political undertone of the Sydney Olympic ceremonies was of reconciliation between Australia and the Australian Indigenous peoples. In the years leading up to the Olympics, Indigenous reconciliation was becoming a central social and political issue after the release of the Bringing Them Home report. These themes were most evident by having both Torres Strait islander and Indigenous performers for both Anu's performance of "My Island Home" and Yothu Yindi's performance of "Treaty", Savage Garden wearing the Australian Aboriginal flag on their shirts while they performed, and including Midnight Oil's anthem "Beds Are Burning" while the band members performed with outfits which had the word "Sorry" (something that the then government would not apologise for).

== Television coverage ==
Host broadcaster: Sydney Olympic Broadcast Organisation, with director Peter Faiman

Rightsholders:

- Australia - Seven Network
- United Kingdom - BBC
- United States - NBC

== See also ==
- 2000 Summer Olympics opening ceremony
- 2004 Summer Olympics closing ceremony
