= Michael Palmer =

Michael or Mick Palmer may refer to:

- Michael Palmer (American football) (born 1988), American football tight end
- Michael Palmer (athlete) (born 1935), British Olympic athlete
- Michael Palmer (British Army officer) (1928–2017), British Defence Services Secretary
- Michael Palmer (Canadian football) (born 1980), wide receiver in the Canadian Football League
- Michael Palmer (conductor) (born 1945), American orchestral conductor
- Michael Palmer (cricketer) (born 2005), West Indian cricketer
- Michael Palmer (musician) (born 1960), Jamaican reggae musician
- Michael Palmer (novelist) (1942–2013), American novelist and author of Extreme Measures
- Michael Palmer (philosopher) (born 1945), English philosopher
- Michael Palmer (poet) (born 1943), American poet and translator
- Michael Palmer (politician) (born 1968), former Singaporean politician
- Mick Palmer (police commissioner) (born 1941), former Australian Federal Police commissioner
- Mick Palmer (Australian politician) (born 1953), former Australian politician

== See also ==
- Mike Palmer, American football player
