= List of most watched Canadian television broadcasts of 1996 =

The following is a list of most watched Canadian television broadcasts of 1996 (single-network only) according to Nielsen Media Research.

== Most watched by week ==
Most watched television broadcasts by week
Week of	Title	Network	Viewers (millions)	Ref.
January 1	ER	CTV	3.38	
January 8	Unknown	Unknown	Unknown	—
January 15	America's Funniest Home Videos	CTV	2.61	
January 22	Unknown	Unknown	Unknown	—
January 29	ER	CTV	3.32	
February 5	ER	CTV	3.46	
February 12	ER	CTV	3.31	
February 19	ER	CTV	3.63	
February 26	America's Funniest Home Videos	CTV	2.51	
March 4	Juno Awards of 1996	CBC	2.28	
March 11	America's Funniest Home Videos	CTV	1.94	
March 18	Unknown	Unknown	Unknown	—
March 25	Unknown	Unknown	Unknown	—
April 1	ER	CTV	3.18	
April 8	America's Funniest Home Videos	CTV	1.94	
April 15	1996 Stanley Cup playoffs (Sun)	CBC	2.45	
April 22	ER	CTV	2.71	
April 29	ER	CTV	3.11	
May 6	ER	CTV	2.78	
May 13	ER	CTV	2.91	
May 20	Roseanne	CTV	1.80	
May 27	1996 Stanley Cup playoffs (Wed)	CBC	1.95	
June 3	1996 Stanley Cup Finals (Game 1)	CBC	1.87	
June 10	1996 Stanley Cup Finals (Game 4)	CBC	2.14	
June 17	ER	CTV	1.60	
June 24	Law & Order	CTV	1.30	
July 1	ER	CTV	1.38	
July 8	Cybill	CTV	1.25	
July 15	1996 Summer Olympics opening ceremony	CBC	2.89	
July 22	Olympic Prime	CBC	2.09	
July 29	1996 Summer Olympics closing ceremony	CBC	2.01	
August 5	Unknown	Unknown	Unknown	—
August 12	Law & Order	CTV	1.29	
August 19	The Three Musketeers	CBC	1.53	
August 26	1996 World Cup of Hockey	CBC	1.58	
September 2	48th Primetime Emmy Awards	CTV	2.56	
September 9	1996 World Cup of Hockey	CBC	3.11	
September 16	Spin City	CTV	2.70	
September 23	ER	CTV	3.46	
September 30	ER	CTV	2.95	
October 7	Unknown	Unknown	Unknown	—
October 14	ER	CTV	3.66	
October 21	The Magical World of Disney	CBC	2.40	
October 28	Unknown	Unknown	Unknown	—
November 4	ER	CTV	3.77	
November 11	ER	CTV	3.58	
November 18	Unknown	Unknown	Unknown	—
November 25	ER	CTV	2.35	
December 2	Unknown	Unknown	Unknown	—
December 9	ER	CTV	3.16	
December 16	Unknown	Unknown	Unknown	—
December 23	CTV Sunday Movie	CTV	1.49	
December 30	Royal Canadian Air Farce	CBC	2.27	
