= 2004 Summer Olympics closing ceremony =

- Part of 2004 Summer Olympics
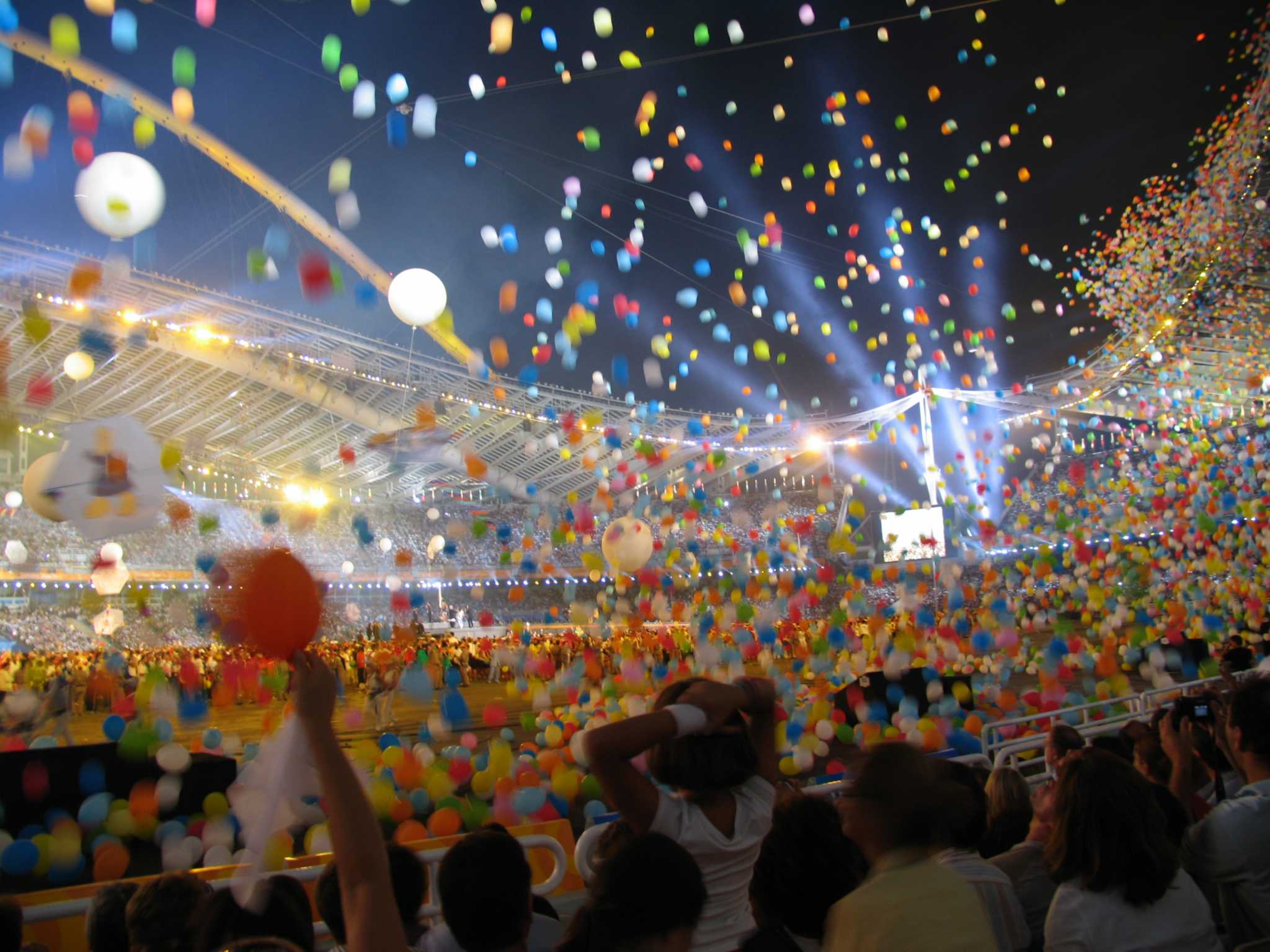
- 2004 Summer Olympics closing ceremony
- Date: 29 August 2004; 21 years ago
- Time: 21:15 - 0:00 EEST (UTC+3)
- Venue: Olympic Stadium
- Location: Maroussi, Athens, Greece; 38°2′10″N 23°47′15″E
- Also known as: May The Dances Last Forever
- Filmed by: Athens Olympic Broadcasting (AOB)
- Footage: Athens 2004 Closing Ceremony - Full Length on YouTube

The closing ceremony of the 2004 Summer Olympics was held on August 29, 2004, at 21:15 EEST (UTC+3) at the Olympic Stadium, in Marousi, Greece, a suburb of Athens.

== Proceedings ==
=== Victory ceremony ===
The medals for the competition were presented by Jacques Rogge, IOC President; Belgium, and the medalists' bouquets were presented by Lamine Diack, IAAF President; Senegal.

The final victory ceremony was held to the three Men's marathon medallists :

Stefano Baldini - Gold
Mebrahtom Keflezighi - Silver
Vanderlei de Lima - Bronze

=== Parade of Nations ===
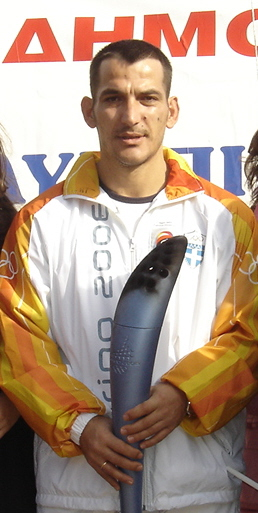
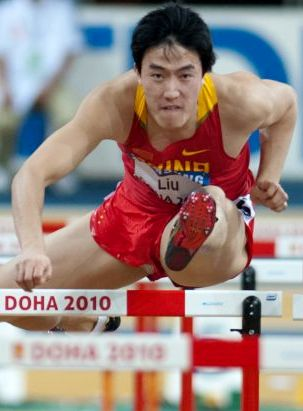
Greek weightlifter Pyrros Dimas (left) and Chinese hurdler Liu Xiang leading the flagbearers during the closing ceremony

The flag bearers of 202 National Olympic Committees entered the stadium in a single file in Greek alphabetical order, followed by the athletes. The Greek and Chinese flag bearers, weightlifter Pyrros Dimas and Chinese hurdler Liu Xiang, entered first as they were the current and next host nation.

=== Speeches and Games declares closed ===
ATHOC President Gianna Angelopoulos-Daskalaki, IOC President Jacques Rogge delivered their speeches, the latter in Greek, French, and English. IOC President Rogge declared the closing of the Games of the XXVIII Olympiad in Athens, thanking Athens ("Ευχαριστούμε, Αθήνα. Ευχαριστούμε, Ελλάδα." - "Thank you, Athens. Thank you, Greece.") and calling upon the youth of the world to assemble 4 years from now in Beijing in accordance with tradition. He also awarded the Olympic Order in Gold to Gianna Angelopoulos-Daskalki, President of the Athens Organizing Committee.

=== Newly elected athlete members of the International Olympic Committee ===
The four athlete members who were elected are:

1. Frankie Fredericks (athletics, Namibia)
2. Jan Železný (athletics, Czech Republic)
3. Hicham El Guerrouj (athletics, Morocco)
4. Rania Elwani (swimming, Egypt)

=== Handover of the Olympic flag ===
Mayor of Athens Dora Bakoyannis, handed over the Olympic flag as the representative of Athens 2004 to the IOC President Jacques Rogge. The flag was then passed to the Mayor of Beijing Wang Qishan, who represented the committee members of the next host city, Beijing 2008, led by Liu Qi.

Both Greek and Chinese flags were raised following the handover.

=== Lowering the Olympic flag ===
The Olympic flag was lowered, while the Greek choirs sang the Olympic Anthem in Greek. The flag was raised again in Turin, Italy during the opening ceremony at Stadio Olimpico Grande Torino on the evening of 10 February 2006.

=== Extinguishing of the Olympic flame ===
The cauldron of the Olympic flame was lowered, followed by the Greek 10-year-old girl Fotini Papaleonidopoulou from SOS Children's Villages lighting a lantern with the Olympic flame with the help of sailing gold medalists Sofia Bekatorou and Emilia Tsoulfa. The lantern was then passed onto other children from around the world, before the flame in the cauldron was blown out.

== Dignitaries in attendance ==
=== Dignitaries from International organizations ===
- International Olympic Committee –
  - IOC President Jacques Rogge and wife Anne Rogge
  - IOC Vice-President Thomas Bach and wife Claudia Bach
  - IOC Vice-President James L. Easton and wife Phyllis Easton
  - IOC Member Sergey Bubka and wife Lilia Tutunik
  - Honorary IOC President for Life Juan Antonio Samaranch
  - and Members of the International Olympic Committee

=== Host country dignitaries ===
- Greece –
  - President of the Hellenic Republic Konstantinos Stephanopoulos
  - Adjutant to the President of the Hellenic Republic Air Force Colonel Georgios Dritsakos
  - ATHOC President Gianna Angelopoulos-Daskalaki & husband Theodore Angelopoulos
  - ATHOC Vice-President and former president of the Hellenic Olympic Committee Lambis Nikolaou and wife Tonia Nikolaou
  - Prime Minister of Greece and Minister for Culture Kostas Karamanlis & wife Natasa Pazaïti
  - Ex-Prime Minister Costas Simitis
  - Ex-Prime Minister of Greece Konstantinos Mitsotakis
  - President of the Panhellenic Socialist Movement and Leader of the Opposition George Papandreou
  - Mayor Dora Bakoyannis

=== Foreign Dignitaries from abroad ===
- Spain –
  - Queen Sofía of Spain
  - Infanta Elena, Duchess of Lugo
  - Infanta Cristina of Spain
  - Crown Prince Felipe and wife Princess Letizia
- Belgium –
  - Prince Philippe and wife Princess Mathilde
- Sweden –
  - King of Sweden Carl XVI Gustaf and wife Queen Silvia of Sweden
- Estonia –
  - President of Estonia Arnold Rüütel and First Lady of Estonia Ingrid Rüütel
- Denmark –
  - Queen Margrethe II of Denmark and Prince Henrik of Denmark
- China – Wang Qishan, mayor of Beijing, represents the government of the People's Republic of China and the 2008 Olympics committee members

== Anthems ==
- National Anthem of Greece
- National Anthem of the People's Republic of China
- (International Olympic Committee) Olympic Hymn (Greek)

=== Victory ceremonies ===
- National Anthem of Italy (Note: Anthem played as part of the Men's marathon victory ceremony.)

== Music performances ==
Various music performances by Greek singers were featured in the Athens Olympic Stadium:

- Dinata — Elefteria Arvanitaki
- San ton Karagiozi — Dionysis Savvopoulos

Other Greek singers featured include:

- Antonis Remos
- Alkistis Protopsalti
- Mihalis Hatzigiannis
- Giannis Parios
- Anna Vissi
- Sakis Rouvas
