= Gilad Karni =

Israeli musical artist

Gilad Karni גלעד קרני
- Genre: classical music
- Occupation: violist
- Instrument: viola
- Label: Naxos Records
- Website: Gilad Karni's homepage

Gilad Karni (Hebrew: גלעד קרני) is an Israeli violist who has played in the New York Philharmonic and is currently principal viola in the Tonhalle Orchestra Zurich as well as a soloist and player in chamber ensembles. A founder member of the Huberman Quartet, with which he made his debut at Carnegie Hall, he has since appeared there with the Guarneri Quartet.

== Early life ==
Born in Israel, Gilad Karni was the attendee of the Thelma Yellin High School of the Arts in Givatayim. From 1985 to 1991 he attended Manhattan School of Music where he was under guidance from Paul Neubauer, Chaim Taub and Gad Lewertoff and was a scholarship recipient from the America-Israel Cultural Foundation.

== Career ==
=== Principal violist ===
In 1991, Karni, at the invitation from maestro Claudio Abbado became a guest principal violinist with the Orchestra of a United Europe. In 1992 Gilad became the youngest member of the New York Philharmonic Orchestra and between 1996 and 2000 was a principal violinist with the Israel Symphony Orchestra Rishon LeZion and the Bamberg Symphony Orchestra. Recently, Mr. Karni had been appointed principal violist of the Tonhalle Orchester Zürich, after serving as Principal for the past 2 years at the Deutsche Oper Berlin.

In Berlin, Mr. Karni is in demand as guest principal at orchestras such as the Staatskapelle Berlin under Daniel Barenboim, Berlin Symphony Orchestra, and Stuttgart Radio Symphony Orchestra, among other European orchestras.

In 2018 Karni had joined Heifetz Institute and since that year is performing with the Ra’anana Symphonette Orchestra.

=== Chamber musician ===
As an avid chamber musician, Mr. Karni has been a member of several chamber music ensembles, including the Huberman Quartet, of which he was a founding member. In 2000 the quartet had its Carnegie Hall debut. His participation in national chamber music festivals include the Jerusalem Chamber Music and the Kfar Bloom festivals while his international chamber music performances span through continents. In Europe, Gilad had played at the Nordic Academy of Denmark, Dubrovnik and Lapland Fests in Sweden, the Swiss Davos Music Festival, the Orchestra Sinfonica di Roma, and the German Festival PRO - Bahnhoff Rolandsek and Neustadt Festival, while in Asia he participated with the Malaysian Philharmonic Orchestra and Georgian Chamber Orchestra.

In the United States Galid became noticed for being a member of the Bangor Symphony Orchestra, and appeared on various music festivals throughout the country, including Aspen, Bellingham and Newport and participated with the Hartford, Santa Barbara, Santa Fe and La Jolla Chamber Music Orchestras. Special events in which he has appeared include Isaac Stern's 70th birthday celebration in Tel-Aviv and a performance with the Guarneri String Quartet in Carnegie Hall. In addition, he has been heard on radio broadcasts in Israel, Germany, France, Switzerland, South Africa and the USA (WQXR and NPR.)

=== Solo appearances ===
In 2006 he had performed Hector Berlioz's Symphonie fantastique and Wolfgang Amadeus Mozart's Sinfonia Concertante with the Bartek Niziol and Hartford Symphony Orchestra.

In May 2009 Gilad Karni had a solo appearance at the Sergei Prokofiev's Romeo and Juliet with the Berliner Symphoniker at the renowned Berlin Philharmonic and during the same year performed Viola Concerto by Béla Bartók in Germany, Switzerland and Poland. He also known for along had solo recitals and chamber concerts in London's Wigmore Hall and Paris's Louvre and played Mozart's Sinfonia Concertante with Israel Sinfonietta, Wuppertal Symphony and the Berlin Symphony Orchestra. Mr. Karni was also engaged in solo performances debuts with the Leipzig Gewandhaus Orchestra and the Deutsches Nationaltheater and Staatskapelle Weimar at which he performed plays by Felix Mendelssohn, and was a founder of the Mendelssohn Players.

Between 2009 and 2010 Karni had worked with the Tonhalle and Biel Symphony Orchestras to produce a Gideon Lewensohn's recording ViolAlive as well as Dmitri Shostakovich's Viola Sonata.

In 2016 Gilad had held a viola mini recital class at the Lynn University.

In May 2017 Gilad Karni performed at the Cornell University.

=== Collaborations ===
Artists that he has collaborated with include musicians such as Isaac Stern, Yefim Bronfman, Mischa Maisky, Julian Rachlin, Itamar Golan, Tabea Zimmermann, Leonidas Kavakos, Nikolaj Znaider and Gerard Causse and many more.

Future engagements for the coming season will include solo appearances alongside world-renowned cellists Yo Yo Ma and Lynn Harrell and the Tonhalle Orchestra Zurich. Return concerts at the Bellingham Festival in Washington-USA and solos in Italy, Germany and Israel are planned during 2006-2008 as well as chamber music performances throughout Europe.

== Awards ==
Violist Gilad Karni, has been praised for his tone and interpretation throughout the world. He is a violist that has left his trade-mark in many international viola competitions, as First Prize Winner of the Lionel Tertis International Viola Competition 1994, and Third Prize Winner (1993) of the ARD Munich International Music Competition. He has performed as a soloist with orchestras in Austria, Denmark, France, Germany, Israel, South Africa, Switzerland, and the USA. Other awards include the Third Prize in the 1992 Bryan International String Competition (USA), First Prize in the Israeli Broadcasting Authority Competition for Best Performance of 1991, the Peter Schidlof Prize for the Most Beautiful Tone in the 1991 Lionel Tertis International Viola Competition (England), and the Best Interpretation Prize for the commissioned concerto (by C. He. Joubert) in the 1989 Third Maurice Vieux International Viola Competition in France.
