= Rudi van den Abbeele =

French Paralympic athlete

Personal information
- Born: 13 November 1952 (age 73) Belgium

Sport
- Country: France
- Sport: Para-athletics
Medal record
Paralympic athletics
Representing France
Paralympic Games
Gold medal – first place	1988 Seoul	Pentathlon 5
Bronze medal – third place	1988 Seoul	Discus throw 5
Bronze medal – third place	1988 Seoul	Shot put 5

Rudi van den Abbeele (born 13 November 1952) is a French former Paralympic athlete. He won several medals in para-athletics at the 1988 Summer Paralympics held in Seoul, South Korea.

In 2017, he was elected president of the International Wheelchair and Amputee Sports Federation (IWAS). He is also a recipient of the Paralympic Order.
