= Dinah Lee Küng =

American-born Swiss journalist and novelist

Dinah Lee Küng is an American-born Swiss journalist and novelist. She reported from East Asia for 20 years for Business Week, The Economist, International Herald Tribune, and The Washington Post. She has been active in international human rights work. She has also written a number of novels, short stories, and radio plays.

== Career ==
Küng was a news reporter on East Asian affairs for 20 years, serving as Bureau Chief for Business Week in Hong Kong; China Bureau Chief for The Economist; and Special Correspondent in Hong Kong for The Economist, International Herald Tribune, and the Washington Post. Her team's reporting for Business Week, on Chinese prison labor, won the Best international reporting in the broadcast media dealing with human rights from the Overseas Press Club of America in 1991.

Küng played a role in the Council on Foreign Relations task force on emerging power in Asia. She is the co-author of a 1997 research report How Can the United States Cope with the Emerging Power of Asia? and served as a member of the Geneva International Committee of the Human Rights Watch.

She has written a number of novels, short stories, and radio plays. She was nominated for the Orange Prize for her 2004 novel, A Visit from Voltaire.

== Biography ==
Dinah Claire Lee studied Chinese at the University of California, Santa Cruz and the University of California, Berkeley. She first traveled to China in 1972, and began working in Hong Kong in 1974. While employed in Hong Kong, she married International Committee of the Red Cross administrator Peter Küng. They have three children. Küng now resides in Switzerland and is a Swiss national.

== Selected publications ==
=== Reporting ===
Dinah Lee. 1982. “Singapore breaks into arms trade with inexpensive assault rifles.” The Washington Post.

Dinah Lee. 1983. “Exxon, China Said to Agree on Oil Accord.” The Washington Post, August 17, 1983, p. Al, 1983.

Dinah Lee, Rose Brady. 1988. “Long Hours--At Pennies and Hour--Chinese Teenagers Are Toiling in the Foreign-Owned Sweatshops of the Special Economic Zones”. 1988-10-31; Business Week; pages 46–47.

P Engardio, T Vogel, Dinah Lee. 1988. Companies are knocking off the knockoff outfits. Business Week.

Dinah Lee. Amy Borrus, Joyce Barnathan. China's Ugly Export Secret: Prison Labor Business Week. April 21, 1991.

Dinah Lee-Küng and Samuel R. Berger. How Can the United States Cope with the Emerging Power of Asia: Report on the Second Annual National Conference of the Council on Foreign Relations: Harold Pratt House, New York, June 6–7, 1997. National Conference of the Council on Foreign Relations, 1997.

=== Novels ===
- Left in the Care Of. Carroll & Graf Publishers. 1998.
- A Visit from Voltaire. 2004.
- Under Their Skin. Halban Publishers, 2006.
- Love and the Art of War. Eyes and Ears Editions, 2012.

Her first novel was later republished as part of the trilogy The Handover Mysteries, under the pen name D.L. Kung.

- The Wardens of Punyu. 2011. (The Handover Mysteries #1)
- The End of May Road. 2011. (The Handover Mysteries #2)
- The Shadows of Shigatse. 2011. (The Handover Mysteries #3)

=== Short stories ===
- On the Back Lot of Life. Eyes and Ears Editions, 2014.

=== Plays ===
- Dear Mr. Rogge (A Play about the Olympics and the Power of Truth). 2012.

== Reception ==
Kung's first novel was reviewed in the Chicago Tribune as being “an unusual debut— lyrical and suspenseful.” The Buffalo News review of the book noted that the "Far East mystery is as notable for its portrayal of Hong Kong while being returned to Communist China as it is for its intimate study of maternal love. Dinah Küng proves an expert storyteller."

Novelist Laila Lalami, discussing the limited exposure of new authors, noted that after the hardcover of Küng's A Visit from Voltaire sold out, since the paperback was published by London publisher Peter Halban, it was not available in the US, but could only through be ordered through the British Amazon site. Lalami urged readers to seek it out. This cross-Atlantic publishing barrier is also mentioned in a profile of the Hablan publishing company, including their difficulty marketing the "scabrous, funny" novel in America.
