= Paul Neubauer =

American violist (born 1962)

Paul Neubauer (born in Encino, California, in 1962) is an American violist. Neubauer was a student of Paul Doktor, Alan de Veritch and William Primrose. In 1980, aged 17, he won the Lionel Tertis International Viola Competition and Workshop on the Isle of Man, which had commissioned Gordon Jacob's Viola Concerto No 2 as a test piece. He gave the first public performance in 1981 as part of his prize. Neubauer attended the Juilliard School, where he received his B.M. in 1982 and his M.M. in 1983. In 1984, at age 21, Neubauer became the principal violist of the New York Philharmonic, the youngest principal string player in the philharmonic's history, a position he held for six years. He became an Artist Member of the Chamber Music Society of Lincoln Center in 1989.

Neubauer has appeared as soloist with orchestras throughout the U.S., Europe, and Asia. He has been featured on Live from Lincoln Center, CBS's Sunday Morning, A Prairie Home Companion, and in Strad, Strings and People magazines. He has been heard on St. Paul Sunday Morning, Morning Edition and Performance Today and appeared in Dark Side, a film starring Edoardo Ballerini and Ali Ahn. In 1989 he became the first violist to receive an Avery Fisher Career Grant. As well as the 1980 Lionel Tertis International Viola Competition prize, Neubauer was the first prize winner of the Whitaker and D'Angelo prizes.

A two-time Grammy nominee, he has recorded on numerous record labels including Decca, Deutsche Grammophon, RCA Red Seal and Sony Classical. He has appeared at the Verbier, Ravinia, Stavanger, Hollywood Bowl, Lincoln Center, Mostly Mozart, and Marlboro festivals, and has collaborated with Itzhak Perlman, Joshua Bell, Pinchas Zukerman, Vladimir Spivakov, Gil Shaham, Isaac Stern, Yo-Yo Ma, Steven Isserlis, James Galway, Yefim Bronfman, Emanuel Ax, Alicia de Larrocha, Andre Watts, Evgeny Kissin, Leon Fleisher and Rudolf Firkušný. He performs with SPA, a trio with soprano Susanna Phillips and pianist Anne-Marie McDermott, with a wide range of repertoire including salon style songs.

Neubauer teaches at the Juilliard School, and Mannes School of Music. Among his students are Richard O’Neill, Gilad Karni, Scott Lee, and Che-Yen Chen. His students have become members of the Chamber Music Society of Lincoln Center, the Miami, Formosa, Ehnes, and Calder quartets, the New York Philharmonic, and the Chicago Symphony Orchestra. He has edited works for Boosey & Hawkes, Universal Edition, and International Music Company. Neubauer is the artistic director of the Mostly Music Series and has been music director of the OK Mozart Festival, the Chamber Music Extravaganza in Curaçao, and at Bargemusic.
