= Michael Palmer (philosopher) =

English philosopher (born 1945)

Michael Palmer (born 1945) is an English philosopher, whose work has been translated into many languages. His primary field of interest is The Philosophy of Religion. More recently, however, his work has concentrated on the philosophy of atheism, culminating in his authorship of The Atheist's Creed (2010), The Atheist's Primer (2012) and the projected Atheism for Beginners (due 2013).

Michael Palmer was educated at Lancing College (1958–1963), St John's College, Durham University (1964–67, 70-72), and McMaster University in Canada (1970–71). His doctorate - on the Theology of Paul Tillich - was supervised at Durham by a Tillich pupil, Professor John Heywood Thomas. After leaving university, Palmer taught for three years at Marlborough College in Wiltshire (1974–77) and it was here that he introduced Philosophy as a Sixth Form subject. 1977 Palmer was the recipient of the prestigious Alexander von Humboldt Fellowship, which enabled him to study at the University of Marburg in Germany. Here Palmer studied with Professor Carl Heinz Ratschow - a friend of Tillich's - and it was he who saw to the publication of Palmer's first book, published by De Gruyter of Berlin: Paul Tillich's Philosophy of Art. Palmer's distinction as a Tillich scholar was crowned by his selection as the only English editor of the comprehensive six-volumed edition of Tillich's Main Works, published by de Gruyter in 1990.

On his return to England in 1980 Palmer became the founding Head of the Department of Religion and Philosophy at The Manchester Grammar School, the first Department of its kind in the country. Here Palmer initiated a compulsory Philosophy course for all Sixth Formers. This course was subsequently published by The Lutterworth Press in 1991 as Moral Problems, and it remains the most successful School philosophy textbook since the War, still widely in use. Its companion volume, Moral Problems in Medicine, was published in 1999.

From 1991-1995 Palmer taught at the University of Bristol. Two sets of his lectures - Freud and Jung on Religion (1997) and The Question of God (2001) - were subsequently published by Routledge. In 2008 The Lutterworth Press published Palmer's two volumed work The Philosophy of Religion. More recently Palmer has become best known for his work on Atheism, and in particular in 2010 for his book The Atheist's Creed. His Credo, which stands at the beginning of this book, has attracted considerable publicity. It reads:-

I believe that the cosmos is all that is or ever was or ever will be.

I believe that no other reality, divine or otherwise, exists. There is no life after death, no meaning to life apart from life, and no events or experiences, individuals or scriptures by which any supra-natural reality can be revealed. The cosmos forms the boundary of our experience.

I believe that human life has no meaning apart from itself: that while there is purpose in life, there is no purpose to life. There is no ultimate justice, no final act of grace and no salvation. This is not a providential universe.

I believe that not everything is permissible. For while that which increases happiness is not always a good, that which increases misery is always an evil.

I believe that by the deployment of reason and the acquisition of knowledge, by the development of moral law and the cultivation of compassion, the suffering of humanity can be alleviated and the condition of our lives improved.

I believe that the path to individual and collective happiness lies in being educated to reality, and in being thus released from the irresponsible and pernicious illusion of religion, for which there is neither evidence nor need.

An adapted edition of The Atheist's Creed, The Atheist's Primer has just been published by The Lutterworth Press (2012).

Another volume on atheism - Atheism for Beginners - is projected for 2013.

Dr Palmer is married with two grown-up children, and lives in Scotland and Italy.

== Bibliography ==
- Paul Tillich's Philosophy of Ar't, Berlin, De Gruyter, 1984
- Moral Problems, Cambridge, The Lutterworth Press, 1991; second edition, 2005 ISBN 9780718830519
- Paul Tillich: Main Works/Hauptwerke, Berlin, De Gruyter, 1990
- Freud and Jung on Religion, London, Routledge, 1997
- Moral Problems in Medicine, Cambridge, The Lutterworth Press, 1999 ISBN 9780718891787
- The Question of God, London, Routledge, 2001
