= Eleftheros Typos =

Newspaper

- Type: Daily newspaper
- Format: Tabloid
- Owner(s): SABD Ekdotiki SA
- Founded: 1916
- Political alignment: Liberalism; Pro-Europeanism; Pro-New Democracy
- Language: Greek
- City: Athens
- Country: Greece

Eleftheros Typos (Greek: Ελεύθερος Τύπος, in English, "Free Press") is a daily newspaper published in Athens.

It was founded in 1916 by Andreas Kavafakis, a liberal Venizelist politician. Kavafakis was murdered in 1922 by anti-Venizelists (see National Schism) and the newspaper was closed in 1927.

It was republished temporarily in the 1960s by Tegopoulos/Kavafakis.

It was republished in 1983 by the Lilian Voudouri Press Foundation. Eminent in liberal and conservative circles, it vied for the top sales spot in the 1980s, but today trails its left-of-center competitors by a margin, though still retaining its influence. It is characterized by a pro-European Union, approach to foreign policy, and supports liberal reforms in the Greek economy. It was purchased by ship-owner and prominent businessman Theodore Angelopoulos, husband of Gianna Angelopoulos-Daskalaki.

On 22 June 2009, the shareholders' general meeting decided to cease operations of Free Press, Press Sunday and Radio City SA. The decision caused a number of media to go on strike for 24 hours. The newspaper permanently shut down all operations on 22 June 2009.

In 2009, SABD Ekdotiki SA obtained the rights to the newspaper title and the newspaper returned to the stands on November 9, 2009.
