= Dimitrios Diathessopoulos =

- Born: 1947 (age 78–79); Piraeus
- Occupations: Lawyer, Politician

Dimitrios Diathessopoulos is a Greek lawyer specializing in sports law, a politician and an important figure in the Greek Sports and International Swimming society. He is called the father of Greek water polo and he is the presently the longest serving president of an athletic federation in Europe.

== Early life ==
He was born in Piraeus in 1947 to a middle-class family. In 1965 he entered the NUOA Law School of Athens and immediately he registered in Center's Union Party Youth branch. Two years later he was elected president of the Law School Students Union, just days before the beginning of the Greek military junta of 1967–1974. During the seven years of the junta he was pursued due to his anti-dictatorship actions. By 1974 he became an early member of the Panhellenic Socialist Movement (PASOK) that some years later came to power in Greece.

== First contact with sports ==
From 1976 he started his career as a water polo referee. At that time water polo referees were paying their expenses out of their own pocket. From 1979 he started to work as a lawyer, while he continued his parallel career as a water polo referee, soon qualifying to work at the A1 Men's Category. He participated as a water polo referee at the 1984 Summer Olympics in Los Angeles. He continued as an active member of the Pan-Hellenic Socialist Party (PASOK).

== The road to presidency ==
In 1984 the PASOK government decided to introduce reforms in Greek sports organization, as part of their general program of reforms. Diathessopoulos was chosen to work with swimmers; he formed a team of competitors. Some months later he won the Hellenic Swimming Federation (KOE) elections and began serving as its President. He still holds this post today with a brief break during 1991-1994, when the New Democracy party was in power in Greece.

== His work ==
During Diathessopoulos' presidency, the Hellenic Swimming Federation developed rapidly and its sports (water polo, swimming, diving, and synchronized swimming) became popular among Greek youth. Successes include a silver medal that was won by women's water polo team at the 2004 Summer Olympics, which is the biggest Greek success in team sports, and a fourth-place finish by the men's water polo team at the Olympics, which is the biggest success of any Greek men's sports team. In 1987 Diathessopoulos was elected General Secretary of the Greek Olympic Committee (EOE), a position that he kept for over 17 years with brief breaks. He is a member of the administrative council of FINA, the international swimming federation. After many years as a member of their bureau, in 2008 he was elected vice-president of the European Swimming Federation (LEN). He was appointed as the highest officer for the development and administration of water polo in Europe.

During his presidency of the Hellenic Swimming Federation (KOE) he worked hard to prevent attempts by the government to reduce its economic and moral support of sports, and he is considered a key player in the struggle against doping in Greece. He was involved in a dispute with the former Minister of Sports, Andreas Fouras, when Fouras attempted to pass legislation that reduced the state's financing of sports and included provisions that would allow the cancellation of any developments in Greek athletics. The affair ended with Foura's expulsion from office; Diathessopoulos was widely recognized for his efforts, which have discouraged any further attempts by the state to cut sports financing. Diathessopoulos is renowned for his actions towards the development of mass sports in Greece. With his protests, political initiatives, work on sports law, and even lawsuits against the Greek state, he has made an important contribution to the enactment of pro-sports developmental legislation. Several times he was considered as the national voice of the Greek sports community. He was a key player in Greece's failed attempt to host the 1996 Summer Olympics, and one of the architects of the successful 2004 Summer Olympics bid. He played an important role as a member of the organizing committee for the event, in cooperation with Gianna Aggelopoulou-Daskalaki. His political activism has brought him the attention of the Greek press on many occasions.

== Other political work ==
Diathessopoulos has kept involved in the Greek political scene. He was elected as president of the Perfectorial Councilor of Athens District from 1994 to 1998. He holds several important offices within PASOK, as a member of its National Committee and a leading member of the committee that directs the party's sports policy. In 2000 he was proposed for the office of General Secretary of Sports in Greece under the Ministry of Culture, but he rejected the offer, as he preferred to pursue a career within international swimming organizations.

== Future plans ==
Dimitris Diathessopoulos was reelected recently to his offices and he is not planning to leave the KOE's Presidency soon. He was elected a member of the FINA Bureau and supreme officer for water polo throughout the world.

His son Michael (Michail) Diathessopoulos, also an attorney at law and a Cambridge scholar, follows the steps of his father, with involvement in politics. He is a member of the National Committee of PASOK and is a leader in PASOK's Youth Organization. Dimitrios Diathessopoulos hopes his son will one day follow in his footsteps as president of the Hellenic Swimming Federation.
