= Whang Youn Dai =

South Korean medical doctor

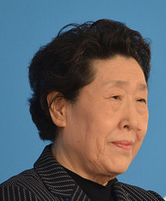
- Born: 12 December 1938 (age 87); Seoul, South Korea
- Education: Ewha Womans University
- Occupation: Medical doctor
- Known for: Advocacy of welfare of people with disabilities Whang Youn Dai Achievement Award
- Awards: Paralympic Order

Korean name
- Hangul: 황연대
- RR: Hwang Yeondae
- MR: Hwang Yŏndae

Whang Youn Dai (Korean: 황연대; born 12 December 1938) is a South Korean medical doctor known for her work on the welfare of people with disabilities and her advocacy of sports for those with disabilities. The Whang Youn Dai Achievement Award is named in recognition of her contributions to Paralympic sport.

== Early life and education ==
Whang was born on 12 December 1938 in Seoul, South Korea. At the age of three she contracted polio which greatly impaired her right leg. Following rehabilitation and surgical treatments, she was able to stand by the age of seven however, she continued to have a limp. As a result, she faced some hardships in her education, including being rejected from admission into an elementary school at the age of 8. Despite this, she was able to successfully complete her elementary and secondary education, and was admitted to Ewha Woman's University in 1957 where she studied medicine. She completed her medical degree in 1963.

== Career ==
After obtaining her medical degree, Whang undertook an internship at the Ewha Womans University Hospital between 1963 and 1964. She started working as a doctor in Severance Hospital in 1965, focusing on treating child polio patients. In 1966 she founded the Korean Polio Children's Special Education and Welfare Association when working at Severance Hospital.

She was awarded a Rotary Foundation Teacher of the Handicapped Educational Award in 1972, becoming the first Korean person to do so. This allowed her to study rehabilitation techniques at New York University Medical Center in 1974–1975. However, severe pains in her right leg required her to return to Korea cutting short her time in New York. Upon her return she founded the Jungnip Centre, the first social welfare centre in Korea to cater to disabled people (affected by polio). The centre provided training in skills and exercise to children and adult and included facilities such as a swimming centre. In addition to founding the centre, Whang also served as its director.

Over the next decade, Whang continued her extensive work in the medical profession, particularly focusing on improving experiences for people with polio. She served as director of public relations of the Korean Medical Women's Association and as editor of the Woman Doctor's News between 1987 and 1980. Since then she has served as Director or been a member of many associations and committees dedicated to improving welfare and promoting sports for disabled people, including being Director and later President of the Korea Employment Promotion Agency for the Disabled Person from 1991 to 1993. She also worked as a member of the Comprehensive Welfare Policy for the Disabled Person (Ministry of Health and Social Affair, South Korea). Her work was recognized by Citi-YWCA Women's Leadership Awards in 2009.

=== Work on Paralympic Sports ===
In 1988, Whang served on the Seoul Paralympic Organizing Committee. She was awarded the 5th "Prize of Today's Woman" by the Wife's Life Magazine and donated her prize money to the International Paralympic Committee. In her honour, the IPC established the Whang Youn Dai Overcome Prize (called the Whang Youn Dai Achievement Award since 2006) to recognise athletes who exemplify the values of the Paralympics. Since 2008, it has been an official part of the closing ceremony. The prize has been awarded to athletes since 1988, the most recent recipients being skiers Sini Pyy and Adam Hall.

Whang has worked on sports for disabled people in numerous other ways: she was Director of the Korea Sports Association for the Disabled (KOSAD) from 1991 to 1998 (continuing as vice president until 2005), mayor of the athletes' village at the 2014 Asian Para Games, and part of the committees for the 2010 and 2014 Pyeongchang Olympic Winter Games bids. She has received multiple awards in recognition of her work, including the highest award of the Paralympics, the Paralympic Order. She was presented with a Plaque of Appreciation from at the closing ceremony of the 2018 Winter Paralympic Games in further recognition of her contributions to the games.

== Personal life ==
She is married to Chung Eun Bae who has also worked on improving the welfare of disabled people in Korea.

== Awards and honours ==
- Rotary Foundation Teacher of the Handicapped Educational Award (1972)
- 5th "Prize of Today's Woman", Wife's Life Magazine (1988)
- Paralympic Order (2005)
- Citi-YWCA Women's Leadership Awards (2009)
- Plaque of Appreciation, Paralympics (2018)
