= Carl Heinz Ratschow =

German theologian

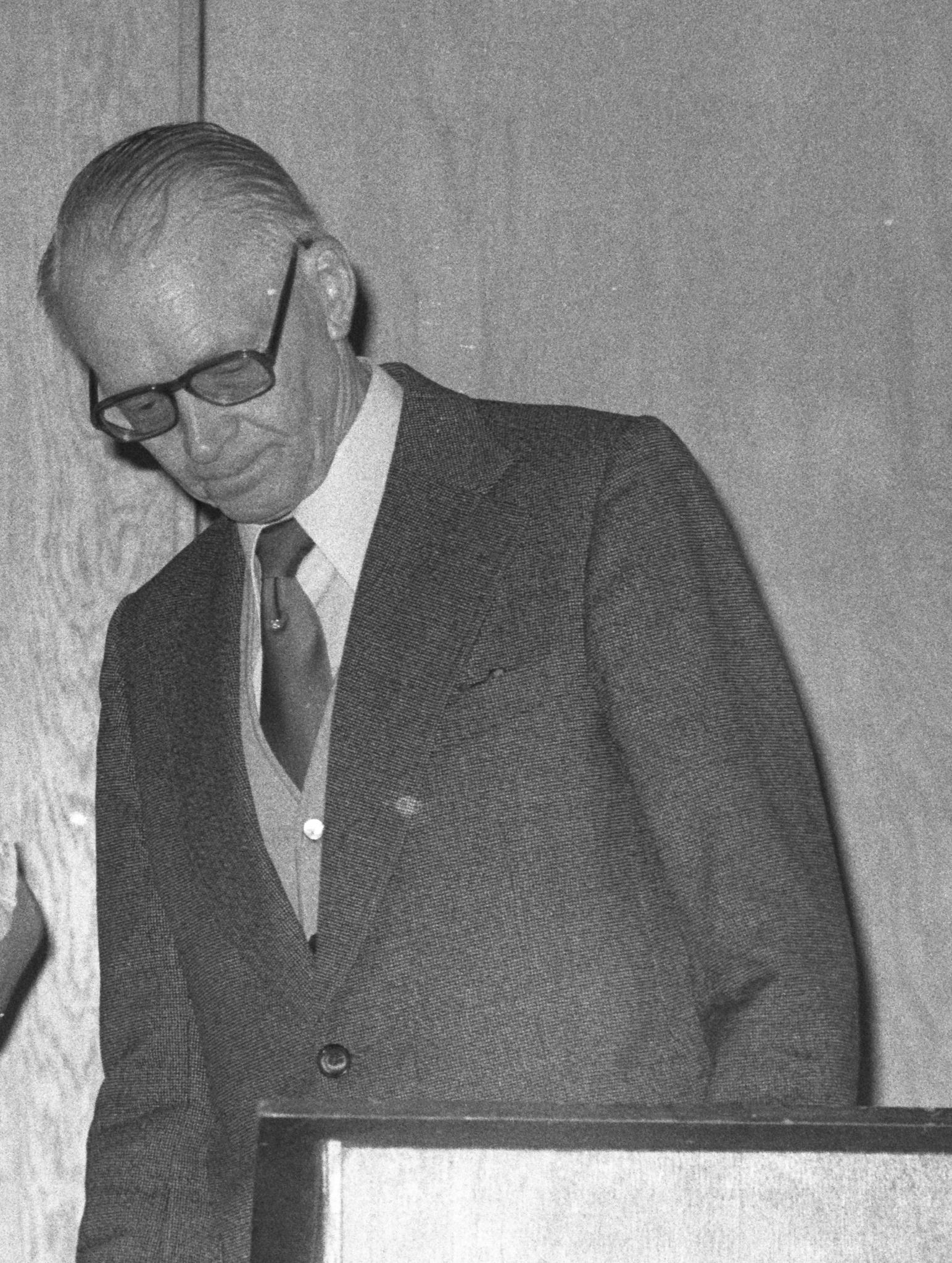
- Ratschow during a theological lecture in the Evangelical Student Community (ESG) Marburg, June 1979

Personal life
- Born: Carl Heinz Franz Johann Gustav Ratschow; 22 July 1911 Rostock, Germany
- Died: 10 November 1999 (aged 88) Marburg, Germany

Religious life
- Religion: Lutheranism

Carl Heinz Ratschow (22 July 1911 – 10 November 1999) was a German Lutheran theologian and philosopher of religion. Ratschow was one of five children of Ernst Ratschow (1865–1937), a businessman, and Clara Hoffschlaeger (1878–1956). Ratschow studied Oriental Studies in Leipzig and Göttingen. Under the influence of the Old Testament scholar Albrecht Alt (1883–1956), he later also studied Protestant theology. After moving to the University of Rostock in 1933, he passed his first theological examination in the Evangelical Lutheran Church of Mecklenburg.
