= Bellingham Festival of Music =

Classical music festival

Coordinates: 43.7382°N 122.4871°W

The Bellingham Festival of Music is the Pacific Northwest's summer orchestra music festival held annually in Bellingham, Washington, USA. It was established in 1993, with American orchestral conductor Michael Palmer as its co-founder and Artistic Director. Following Palmer's retirement in 2023, Marcelo Lehninger was appointed Artistic Director and conducted his first season in July 2024.

The festival's programming features orchestral and chamber music concerts which take place in the Performing Arts Center of Western Washington University. Guest artists appear as soloists in concertos and choral works.

The 60-member Bellingham Festival Orchestra is composed of musicians, many of them principals, from major North American orchestras. The musicians are housed in private homes hosted by local music lovers. Many of the players return year after year and stay with the same home hosts, forming lifelong friendships. There is also a Bellingham Festival Chorus, directed by Choirmistress Wendy Bloom, which performs regularly with the orchestra. It is composed of singers from surrounding Whatcom, Snohomish and Skagit counties who are selected by audition each year.

The Calidore String Quartet is the Festival's ensemble in residence and plays a full concert every season.

Marcelo Lehninger, Music Director of the Grand Rapids Symphony since 2016, is an active guest conductor in both the United States and internationally. Recent guest appearances have taken him from São Paulo in his native Brazil to Johannesburg in South Africa. In the US, he has led the orchestras in Chicago, Boston, Seattle, St. Louis, Houston and Baltimore.

During his first season with the Bellingham Festival of Music, Lehninger inaugurated the Conducting Institute, a program for emerging conductors that includes coaching and podium time for the Fellows.

For his 2025 BFM season, June 29-July 20, Maestro Lehninger has chosen the theme of musical world travel with repertory "stops" in Russia, London, Scotland, Vienna, and Paris. Guest artists will include Simon Trpčeski, cellist Sterling Elliott, violinist Simone Porter, flutist Christina Smith and harpist Sophie Baird-Daniel. The Calidore String Quartet will perform an all-American program. Conductor Laureate Michael Palmer will return to conduct one program.
