= Maura Strange =

Secretary General of International Stoke Mandeville Games Federation
- In office 1993–2012

Maura Strange is the former secretary-general of the International Wheelchair and Amputee Sports Federation from 1993 to 2012. She started her career in the 1970s volunteering with the Stoke Mandeville Hospital and remained working in disability sports until her retirement in 2012. Strange was awarded the Paralympic Order in 2009 and the International Wheelchair and Amputee Sports's Pursuit Trophy in 2013.

== Career ==
Strange began her career with the Stoke Mandeville Hospital as a fundraiser for the construction of the National Spinal Injuries Centre in the 1970s. She moved to become a part of the Stoke Mandeville Games as a volunteer administrator in the 1980s and became a member of Organisers of International Congresses on Disability Sport. While volunteering in wheelchair basketball, Strange joined the International Stoke Mandeville Games Federation in 1988. With the ISMGF, Strange continued administrating before being promoted to coordinator.

In 1993, Strange was named the Secretary General of the International Stoke Mandeville Wheelchair Sports Federation. Strange retired from her position of Secretary General in 2012. Outside of her administrating career, Strange was a flagbearer at the closing ceremony of the 2009 International Wheelchair and Amputee Sports World Games. Strange was also part of the European Paralympic Committee and a member of the EPC's Women in Sports group in 2012.

== Awards and honours ==
In 2009, Strange received the Paralympic Order. In 2013, Strange was awarded the Pursuit Trophy by the IWAS.
