= Ioanna Karyofylli =

- ιωάννα καρυοφύλλη

City councillor of Nea Smyrni
- Incumbent
- Assumed office 2014

President of the Hellenic Paralympic Committee
- In office 2000–2004

Personal details
- Profession: councillor

Ioanna Karyofylli is a city councillor of Nea Smyrni, Greece since 2014 and a former member of Greece's Ministry of Sport. Outside of politics, Karyofylli was the president of the Hellenic Paralympic Committee from 2000 to 2004 and general manager of the Athens Organizing Committee for the Olympic Games for the preparation of the 2004 Summer Olympics. After the Olympics, Karyofylli was awarded the Paralympic Order in 2004.

== Career ==
Karyofylli originally worked in finance for Greece's Ministry of Sport when she moved to the ministry's sports development section in 1999. The same year, Karyofylli was a representative for the Greek Ministry at the Salt Lake City General Assembly meeting held by the International Paralympic Committee. In 2000, Karyofylli was named president of the Hellenic Paralympic Committee and became the general manager for the preparation of the 2004 Summer Paralympics.

As a member of the Athens Organizing Committee for the Olympic Games, Karyofylli was a part of the planning to make transportation in Athens more accessible for Paralympic competitors. In 2005, Karyoflli was elected as a member of the European Paralympic Committee. In 2009, Karyofylli was nominated to be a member of the IPC, but she was not elected. Outside of her career in sports development, Karyofylli was the head of mission for Greece at the 2013 Mediterranean Games. In 2014, she was selected for a five year term as a city councillor for Nea Smyrni.

== Awards and honours ==
In 2004, Karyofylli was awarded the Paralympic Order.
