= Atlanta Symphony Youth Orchestra =

Youth Orchestra

The Atlanta Symphony Youth Orchestra, commonly known as the ASYO, is an organization featuring Atlanta's young instrumentalists, created in 1974. Each May, about 300 middle to high school instrumentalists go through one or more auditions for places in the ASYO (the minimum age requirement is 13, though exceptions are made). Only about 100 will be selected to participate in the season.

== The youth orchestra ==
In 1974, the Atlanta Symphony Youth Orchestra was created as a subsidiary of the Atlanta Symphony Orchestra, a practice that is relatively rare for American orchestras. However, this arrangement worked for the Atlanta Symphony Orchestra since it began as a youth ensemble itself, the Atlanta Youth Symphony of 1944–47.

Thirty years after the start of the Atlanta Youth Symphony, the Atlanta Symphony Youth Orchestra was formed, first directed under Michael Palmer, associate conductor of the ASO. Sung Kwak was the successor to Michael Palmer as conductor of the orchestra and conducted for two years. From 1979 to 2014, Jere Flint was the conductor of the orchestra. From 2014 to 2017, Joseph Young was the conductor. Stephen Mulligan was the conductor from 2017 to 2020, and Jerry Hou has been the conductor since 2020. Buddy Langeley will take over the position of music director beginning with the 2023–2024 season.

Members of the Atlanta Symphony Orchestra often work with members of the youth orchestra during Saturday rehearsals. This program has been in effect since orchestra was founded. More than 50 ASO players have served as ASYO coaches.

== Concerts ==
Each season, the youth orchestra performs at least three subscription concerts, in addition to annual Kids' Holiday concerts and a Family Concert. At least one concert each season features youth orchestra soloists selected through an annual Concerto Competition. Another annual competition, the Scholarship Auditions, reward the winners with scholarships which are used to further musical studies at summer camps, colleges and conservatories.

The Atlanta Symphony Youth Orchestra promotes the arts and arts education in the Atlanta community, and it performs an annual concert for the Atlanta Ministry with International Students. Occasionally, the youth orchestra performs large symphonic-choral works in concerts with local high school chorus members as a part of the Atlanta Symphony Youth Orchestra Chorus. As of the 2006–2007 season, the last time this occurred was May 2002. The ASYO also commissions works by local and national composers.

The ASYO has hosted or exchanged visits with youth orchestras from Great Britain, Australia, and Berlin, Germany.

During the 1996 Cultural Olympiad, the youth orchestra performed to sold-out audiences. The youth orchestra was also the featured orchestra at the closing ceremonies of the 1996 Olympic Games and broadcast worldwide. Four concerts of recent performances have been highlighted on National Public Radio's "Performance Today" series. In addition to that, ASYO concerts are replayed on local radio station WABE FM-90.1.

The youth orchestra was invited to perform for the Georgia Music Educators Association in January 2005. In April 2005, the youth orchestra performed and recorded two live concerts with Atlanta rock band Collective Soul. They are showcased in the DVD Home: A Live Concert Recording With The Atlanta Symphony Youth Orchestra.

Other guest artists including Jennifer Larmore, Jami Rogers, and Andrés Díaz have performed with the Atlanta Symphony Youth Orchestra. Guest conductors Robert Shaw, Yoel Levi, Mark Waters, Michael Kamen, Alexander Mickelthwate, Donald Runnicles, and Robert Spano have also conducted the youth orchestra.

A number of the youth orchestra's members have gone on to study music in conservatories and university music departments and pursue careers in music, as teachers and performers.
