= Michael Palmer (conductor) =

American orchestral conductor (born 1945)

Michael Palmer (born 8 May 1945, Indianapolis, Indiana) is an American orchestral conductor. Since 1993 he has served as Artistic Director of the annual Bellingham Festival of Music (Bellingham, Washington, United States).

After receiving his bachelor of music from Indiana University School of Music in Bloomington, Palmer began his professional career at age 21 when he became Assistant Conductor of the Atlanta Symphony Orchestra in 1967, for which he was later named Associate Conductor. In that capacity he also became the first director of the Atlanta Symphony Youth Orchestra in 1974. In 1975 he was one of the first young conductors to be selected as an EXXON/Arts Endowment Conductor by the National Endowment for the Arts.

He left the Atlanta Symphony Orchestra in 1977 to become Music Director of the Wichita Symphony Orchestra (1977–1990), followed by posts of Music Director of the New Haven Symphony Orchestra (1989–1997) and the American Sinfonietta (1991–2002).

Palmer also was Guest Conductor for three seasons for the Houston Symphony Orchestra (1978–1981) and a Co-Principal Guest Conductor of the Denver Symphony Orchestra (1979–1982). He has also held academic conducting posts as Director of Orchestras for Wichita State University (1999–2004) and Georgia State University (2004–present) where he is the Charles Worm Distinguished Professor of Orchestral Studies.
