= Whang Youn Dai Achievement Award =

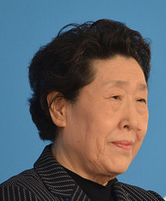
Whang Youn Dai

The Whang Youn Dai Achievement Award is named after South Korean medical doctor Whang Youn Dai, who contracted polio at the age of three. She devoted her life to the development of paralympic sport in Korea and around the world. At the 1988 Paralympic Summer Games in Seoul, South Korea, the International Paralympic Committee (IPC) recognized her lifelong contributions to the Paralympic Movement and established the Whang Youn Dai Achievement Award (formerly the Whang Youn Dai Overcome Prize). Since then, this award has been presented at every Paralympic Games to one male and one female athlete who each "best exemplify the spirit of the Games and inspire and excite the world".

According to the IPC, "the award is for someone who is fair, honest and is uncompromising in his or her values and prioritizes the promotion of the Paralympic Movement above personal recognition." Six finalists, three female and three male, are selected from participants at the Paralympic Games. Two winners are then selected as recipients of the prize and receive a gold medal at the closing ceremonies of the Games. South African sprint runner Oscar Pistorius was nominated for the award in 2012, but did not win. The IPC decided that from the 2020 Tokyo Paralympics, it will no longer be awarded in the closing ceremony for the Paralympics. Instead, it was replaced by the I'mPOSSIBLE Award, established by the Agitos Foundation and the International Paralympic Committee and supported by the Nippon Foundation Paralympic Support Centre.

== Winners ==
Year	Host	Season	Winner	NPC	Ref
1988	Seoul	Summer	Anne Trotman	Great Britain	
1988	Seoul	Summer	Pier Morten	Canada	
1992	Barcelona	Summer	Jacile Wolfgang	United States	
1992	Barcelona	Summer	Gabriel Angel	Chile	
1996	Atlanta	Summer	Beatriz Mendoza Rivero	Spain	
1996	Atlanta	Summer	David Lega	Sweden	
1998	Nagano	Winter	Kim Mi-Jeong	South Korea	
1998	Nagano	Winter	Marcin Kos	Poland	
2000	Sydney	Summer	Martina Willing	Germany	
2000	Sydney	Summer	Oumar B. Kone	Ivory Coast	
2002	Salt Lake City	Winter	Lauren Woolstencroft	Canada	
2002	Salt Lake City	Winter	Axel Hecker	Germany	
2004	Athens	Summer	Zanele Situ	South Africa	
2004	Athens	Summer	Rainer Schmidt	Germany	
2006	Turin	Winter	Olena Iurkovska	Ukraine	
2006	Turin	Winter	Lonnie Hannah	United States	
2008	Beijing	Summer	Natalie Du Toit	South Africa	
2008	Beijing	Summer	Said Gomez	Panama	
2010	Vancouver	Winter	Colette Bourgonje	Canada	
2010	Vancouver	Winter	Endo Takayuki	Japan	
2012	London	Summer	Mary Nakhumicha Zakayo	Kenya	
2012	London	Summer	Michael McKillop	Ireland	
2014	Sochi	Winter	Bibian Mentel-Spee	Netherlands	
2014	Sochi	Winter	Toby Kane	Australia	
2016	Rio de Janeiro	Summer	Tatyana McFadden	United States	
2016	Rio de Janeiro	Summer	Ibrahim Al Hussein	Individual Paralympic Athletes	
2018	Pyeongchang	Winter	Sini Pyy	Finland	
2018	Pyeongchang	Winter	Adam Hall	New Zealand	
