= Athens Organizing Committee for the Olympic Games =

2004 Olympics local organizing committee

Coordinates: 38.0415°N 23.76135°E

- Type: Company limited by guarantee
- Headquarters: Iolkou 8 and Filiki Eterias; 142 34 Nea Ionia, Greece
- President: Gianna Angelopoulos-Daskalaki
- Website: athens2004.com (archived)

The Athens 2004 Organising Committee for the Olympic Games (Greek: Οργανωτική Επιτροπή Ολυμπιακών Αγώνων Αθήνα 2004), commonly abbreviated to ATHOC, was the organising committee for the 2004 Summer Olympics and Paralympics.

Their headquarters was in Nea Ionia – about 7 km (4.3 mi) north of Athens, and 2.1 km (1.3 mi) west of the Athens Olympic Sports Complex (OAKA).

The President of ATHOC was Gianna Angelopoulos-Daskalaki.

== Board members ==
The members were:

- Gianna Angelopoulos-Daskalaki – President
- Lambis Nikolaou – Vice President
- Ioanna Karyofylli – General Manager
- Ioannis Spanudakis – Managing Director
- Yannis N. Pyrgiotis – Executive Director
- Marton Simitsek – Executive Director
- Theodore Papapetropoulos – Executive Director
- Dora Bakoyannis – Member
- Nikos Filaretos – Member
- Spyros Zannias – Member
- Dimitris Diathesopoulos – Member
- Nikolaos Exarchos – Member
- Panayiotis Tzanikos – Member
- Ioannis Manos – Member
- Kostas Georgiadis – Member
- Demetrios Glavas – Member
- Christos Polyzogopoulos – Member
- Pyrros Dimas – Member
