= Gianna Angelopoulos-Daskalaki =

Greek businesswoman

Gianna Angelopoulos–Daskalaki Olympic Order
- Γιάννα Αγγελοπούλου-Δασκαλάκη
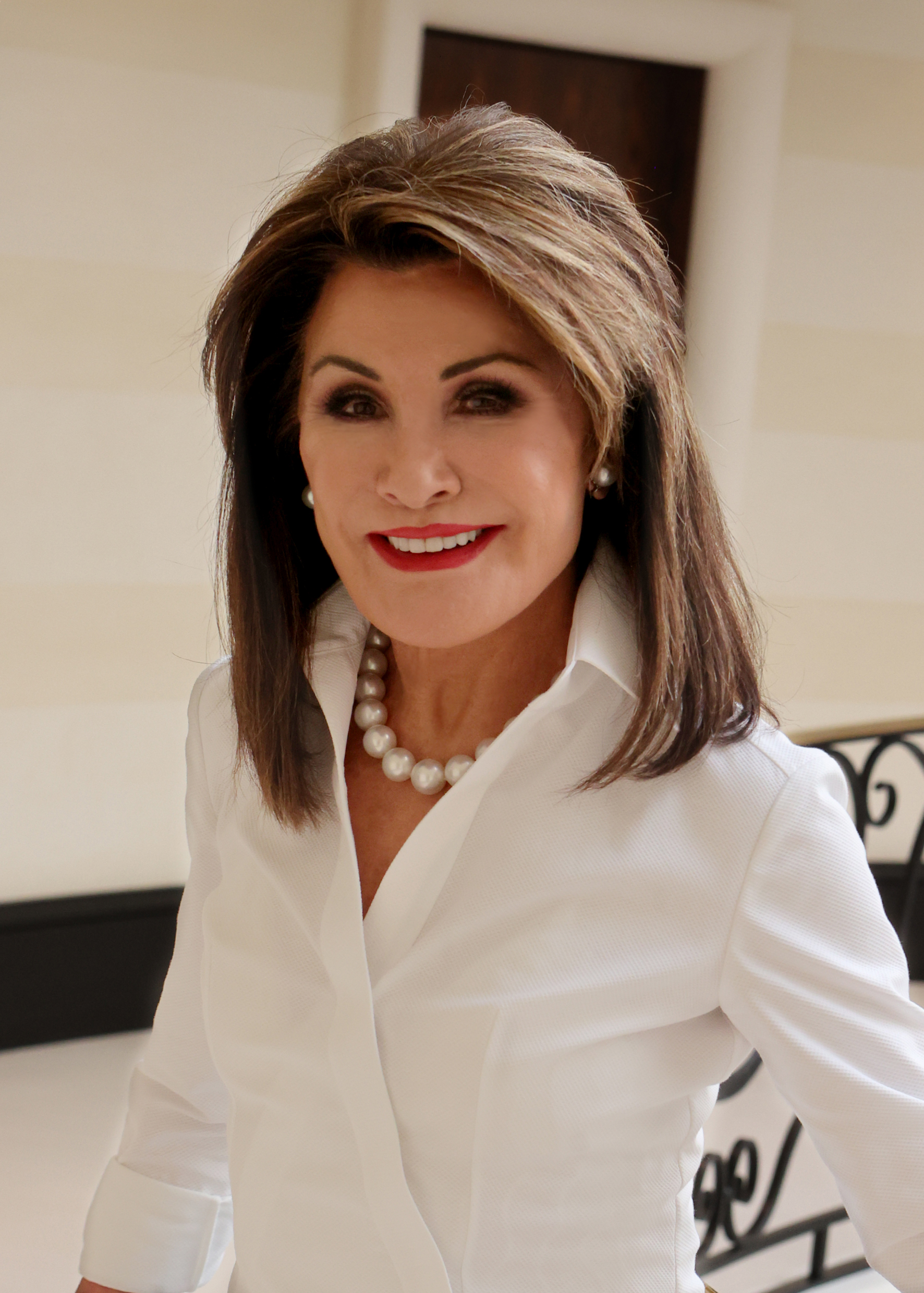

President “Greece 2021” National Committee
- In office 31 July 2019 – 31 December 2021

President of the Athens Organizing Committee for the Olympic Games
- In office 1 October 2000 – 29 August 2004
- IOC President: Juan Antonio Samaranch (2000–01); Jacques Rogge (2001–04)
- Preceded by: Michael Knight
- Succeeded by: Liu Qi

Chair of the Athens Organizing Committee for the Olympic Games
- In office 15 May 2000 – 8 July 2005; Chair of the Athens bid: 1996 – 1997
- Preceded by: Panagiotis Thomopoulos
- Succeeded by: Position dissolved

Convening Sponsor, Clinton Global Initiative Honorary Ambassador of the Greek State

Personal details
- Born: 12 December 1955 (age 70) Heraklion, Greece
- Party: New Democracy
- Spouse(s): George Parthenis (1979-1990); Theodoros Angelopoulos (m. 1990)
- Children: Carolina Partheni-Angelopoulos; Panagiotis Angelopoulos; Dimitris Angelopoulos
- Relatives: Frixos Daskalakis (father); Eleni Daskalaki (sister) (1958); Marika Daskalaki(mother) (1932)
- Education: Law School of the Aristotle University of Thessaloniki
- Occupation: Lawyer

Gianna Angelopoulos-Daskalaki (born Ioanna Daskalaki, December 12, 1955) is a Greek businesswoman and Ambassador-at-Large for the Hellenic Republic. She is best known for being the leader of the bidding and organizing committees for the 2004 Summer Olympics in Athens. In July 2019, she was appointed by Prime Minister Kyriakos Mitsotakis, to lead Greece 2021, a year-long initiative to both commemorate the 200th anniversary of the Greek War of Independence and to introduce to the world a new Greece of effort and optimism.

She was named one of the 50 most powerful women by Forbes magazine and is the author of the New York Times Bestseller My Greek Drama.

== Early life ==
Ioanna Daskalaki was born to a middle-class family in Heraklion, Crete. Daskalaki studied law in the Aristotle University of Thessaloniki.

== Personal life ==
In 1990, she married the Greek shipping and steel magnate Theodore Angelopoulos, and has since been involved in several aspects of Angelopoulos' business interests, mainly in shipping.

She is the mother of three children, Panagiotis, Dimitris, and Carolina Angelopoulos, and the grandmother of six grandchildren (3 boys and 3 girls).

== Political career ==
In the late 1980s, she became actively involved in politics in Athens. In 1986, she was elected to the Athens Municipal Council. In 1989, she was elected to the Greek Parliament, and won reelection the following year.

In 1998, she was appointed Ambassador at Large by the Greek government. She was paid for this appointment and donates the sums to several Greek charities each year.

In 2004 she was appointed Commander of the Order of Honour of the Hellenic Republic and in 2008, she was appointed Chevalier of the French Republic's National Order of the Legion of Honor.

== Involvement in the 2004 Summer Olympic Games ==
Disappointed over losing the bid for the centenary celebration of the revival of the Olympic Games in 1996, Greek officials decided to bid for the 2004 Summer bidding committee, making her the first female president of any summer Olympic or Paralympíc organizing committee, and succeeded in bringing the games to Athens. She was however excluded from the initial organization committee that would prepare for the games.

When the International Olympic Committee questioned Greece's commitment to the games and its ability to complete all preparations prior to the opening ceremony, Angelopoulos-Daskalaki was asked to return and was named president of the Olympic Organizing Committee in May 2000. She was the first woman to hold this position. Under her watch, competition facilities were completed and security issues were taken care of. International Olympic Committee presidents Juan Antonio Samaranch and Jacques Rogge both specifically credit Gianna Angelopoulos-Daskalaki for the success of the games. In his speech at the Closing Ceremony, Rogge said, "These Games were unforgettable, dream Games."

After the 2004 Olympic Games, Angelopoulos-Daskalaki bought the Eleftheros Typos newspaper ("Free Press”); the daily paper eventually was wound up, with its staff receiving on top of their severance pay the proceeds from the sale of the paper's title. She also attended the opening ceremony of the next Olympics, in Turin, Italy.

== Involvement in Greece 2021 ==
Greece 2021 was a multidimensional initiative that occurred at the time of the 200th Anniversary of the Greek Revolution. While honoring Greece's past, Greece 2021 primarily celebrated the skill and resilience of the Greek people and demonstrated its confidence in the future. Specific emphasis on entrepreneurship, science and innovation, will highlighted the opportunities found in the modern Greece.

In 2019, the Greek Government appointed Mrs Angelopoulos as President of the "Greece 2021" National Committee.

== Post-political career ==
In 1994, she was appointed vice chair of the Dean’s Council at Harvard University’s John F. Kennedy School of Government, where she has continued to serve. In this role, she has been involved in supporting the school’s academic initiatives, public service programs, and leadership development efforts.

In 1995, Angelopoulos-Daskalaki co-chaired, along with Kennedy School Professor Graham Allison, a Harvard Leadership Symposium titled The Greek Paradox: Promise vs. Performance, which addressed the gap between Greece's potential and its performance in the realms of politics, economic growth, and regional leadership. Harvard published a book that followed the symposium with the same title. Angelopoulos-Daskalaki is the author of the book's preface.

In 2008, Harvard University, in collaboration with the Kennedy School of Government Chan School of Public Health, established the Angelopoulos Chair for Public Health and International Development.

In 2012, she created the Harvard Kennedy School-based Angelopoulos Global Public Leaders Fellowship program as a part of a Commitment to Action for the Clinton Global Initiative. The program was announced by Ambassador Angelopoulos, with Dean Ellwood and former U.S. President Bill Clinton at the Clinton Global Initiative annual meeting in 2011. The program provides opportunities for high-profile leaders who are transitioning out of public office or other leadership positions to spend time in residence at Harvard for teaching, learning and research.

In 2013, Angelopoulos-Daskalaki established the Angelopoulos Clinton Global Initiative University (CGIU) Fellowship program to recruit, select and sponsor Greek students with implementable entrepreneurial ideas. She has since sponsored over 75 students. In 2016, she announced the evolution of the CGIU program into the Angelopoulos 100, a vehicle to sustain and support the alumni of the program and continue to empower Greek entrepreneurs.

In February 2019, Gianna Angelopoulos established a program at Cambridge University, the Gianna Angelopoulos Programme for Science, Technology and Innovation. The programme will support PhD students and four academic positions based at the university's Cavendish Laboratory in the fields of energy materials and devices and computational multiphysics.

== Authored Books ==
She is the author of My Greek Drama: Life, Love, and One Woman’s Olympic Effort to Bring Glory to Her Country. The book debuted at number 18 on the New York Times nonfiction best-seller list for the June 2, 2013 print edition, and rose to number 7 in the June 9, 2013 print edition. The book also appeared on the best-seller lists of The Wall Street Journal and USA Today.

== Selected interviews ==
MSNBC (6 May 2013) – Greece is in a 'bad marriage with the European Union'

Sporting positions
Preceded by (Greece) Panagiotis Thomopoulos	President of the Organising Committee for the Olympic Games; 2004	Succeeded by (China) Liu Qi
