= Jacques Rogge =

President of the IOC from 2001 to 2013

His Excellency Count Jacques Rogge KCMG OLY
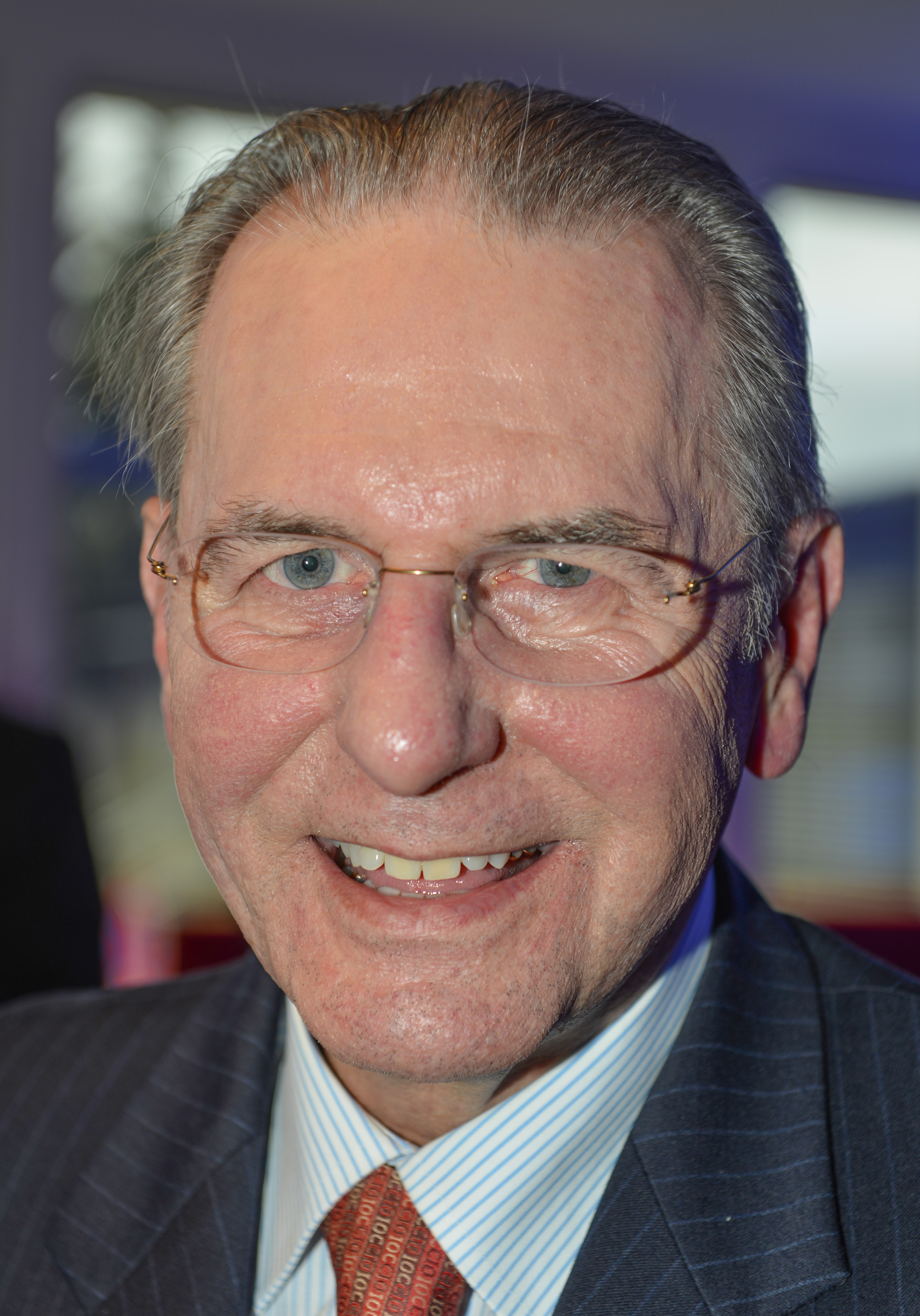
- Rogge in 2014

8th President of the International Olympic Committee
- In office 16 July 2001 – 10 September 2013
- Preceded by: Juan Antonio Samaranch
- Succeeded by: Thomas Bach

Honorary President of the International Olympic Committee
- In office 10 September 2013 – 29 August 2021
- President: Thomas Bach
- Preceded by: Vacant, last held by Juan Antonio Samaranch (2010)
- Succeeded by: Vacant, next held by Thomas Bach (2025)

Personal details
- Born: Jacques Jean Marie Rogge; 2 May 1942 Ghent, Belgium
- Died: 29 August 2021 (aged 79) Deinze, Belgium
- Spouse: Anne Bovyn
- Children: 2
- Education: University of Ghent
- Profession: Orthopedic surgeon Sports administrator

Jacques Jean Marie, Count Rogge (French: [ʒɑk ʁɔɡ], Dutch: [ʑɑk ˈrɔɣə]; 2 May 1942 – 29 August 2021) was a Belgian sports administrator, former athlete, and physician, who served as the eighth president of the International Olympic Committee (IOC) from 2001 to 2013. In 2013, Rogge became the IOC's honorary president, a lifetime position, which he held until his death from Parkinson's disease in August 2021.

== Early life and education ==
Rogge was born on 2 May 1942 in Ghent, Belgium. He was the son of Suzanne and Charles Rogge, an engineer. Rogge was by profession an orthopedic surgeon and was educated at the Jesuit private school Sint-Barbaracollege and the University of Ghent.

== Career ==
Rogge was a noted athlete in his home country. He was a 16-time Belgian national champion in rugby and a one-time yachting world champion. He also competed in the Finn class of sailing on three Summer Olympic Games; in 1968, 1972, and 1976.

Rogge served as president of the Belgian Olympic Committee from 1989 to 1992, and as president of the European Olympic Committees from 1989 to 2001. He became a member of the IOC in 1991 and joined its executive board in 1998. He was knighted in 1992, and in 2002 made a count in the Belgian nobility by King Albert II. When Rogge stepped down as President of the IOC he was awarded by his successor a gold Olympic Order.

=== President of the IOC (2001–2013) ===
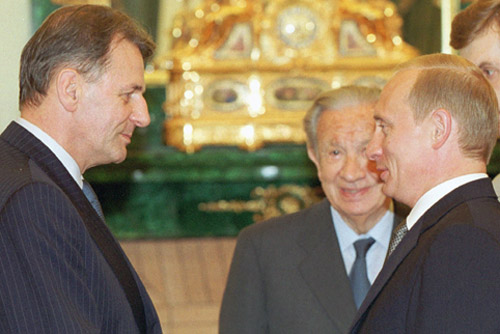
Jacques Rogge with Juan Antonio Samaranch and Vladimir Putin following Rogge's election as IOC President in 2001

Rogge was elected as President of the IOC on 16 July 2001 at the 112th IOC Session in Moscow as the successor to Juan Antonio Samaranch, who had previously led the IOC since 1980.

At the 2002 Winter Olympics in Salt Lake City, Rogge became the first ever IOC President to stay in the Olympic village, thereby enjoying closer contact with the athletes.

In October 2009, Rogge was re-elected for a new term as President of the IOC.

In 2011, a Forbes magazine list of the 68 most powerful people in the world listed Rogge at no. 67.

On 27 July 2011, one year prior to London 2012, Rogge attended a ceremony at Trafalgar Square where he invited athletes worldwide to compete in the forthcoming Olympic Games. Former Olympians the Princess Royal and Sebastian Coe unveiled the medals up for grabs, after both Prime Minister David Cameron and London Mayor Boris Johnson had given speeches.

In December 2011, Rogge was invested as an Officer of the Legion of Honour by French President Nicolas Sarkozy.

On 10 September 2013, Rogge came to an end of his IOC presidency at the 125th IOC Session in Buenos Aires, Argentina after the session awarded the 2020 Tokyo Summer Olympics (Later postponed to 2021 due to COVID-19 pandemic in Japan). German lawyer, former foil fencer, and Olympic gold medalist Thomas Bach was elected as the new IOC President at the session. Rogge was then made Lifetime Honorary President of the IOC, a position which he held until his death in 2021.

==== Controversies ====
PRC internet censorship

For the 2008 Summer Olympics in Beijing, People's Republic of China, Rogge pronounced in mid-July 2008 that there would be no Internet censorship by PRC government authorities: "for the first time, foreign media will be able to report freely and publish their work freely in China". However, by 30 July 2008, IOC spokesman Kevan Gosper had to retract this optimistic statement, admitting that the Internet would indeed be censored for journalists. Gosper, who said he had not heard about this, suggested that high IOC officials (probably including the Dutch Hein Verbruggen and IOC Director of the Olympic Games, Gilbert Felli, and most likely with Rogge's knowledge) had made a secret deal with PRC officials to allow the censorship, without the knowledge of either the press or most members of the IOC. Rogge later denied that any such meeting had taken place, but failed to insist that the PRC adhere to its prior assurances that the Internet would not be censored.

The play Dear Mr. Rogge, written by Dinah Lee Küng in 2012, depicts an imprisoned PRC dissident who wrote a letter challenging Rogge to walk from the Birds Nest stadium to Beijing Prison No. 2 in order to check the truth of Rogge's claim that hosting the Olympics would serve as a catalyst only for good in the country.

Criticism of Bolt's jubilation

Rogge commented that Usain Bolt's gestures of jubilation and excitement after winning the 100 meters in Beijing are "not the way we perceive being a champion," and also said "that he should show more respect for his competitors." In response to his comments, Yahoo! Sports columnist, Dan Wetzel, who covered the Games, described him as "a classic stiff-collared bureaucrat," and further contended that "[the IOC] has made billions off athletes such as Bolt for years, yet he has to find someone to pick on". In an interview with Irish Times' reporter Ian O'Riordan, Rogge clarified, "Maybe there was a little bit of a misunderstanding.... What he does before or after the race I have no problem with. I just thought that his gesticulation during the race was maybe a little disrespectful".

Munich Massacre moment of silence

Rogge rejected calls for a minute of silence to be held to honor the 11 Israeli Olympians killed 40 years prior in the Munich massacre, during the opening ceremonies of the 2012 Summer Olympics. He did this despite the standing request of the families of the 11 Israeli Olympic team members and political pressure from the United States, Britain, and Germany, stating: "We feel that the opening ceremony is an atmosphere that is not fit to remember such a tragic incident." Speaking of the decision, Israeli Olympian Shaul Ladany, who had survived the Munich massacre, commented: "I do not understand. I do not understand, and I do not accept it." Rogge and the IOC instead opted for a ceremony at Guildhall, London, on 6 August, and one at Fürstenfeldbruck Air Base on the anniversary of the attack, 5 September.

== Later life ==
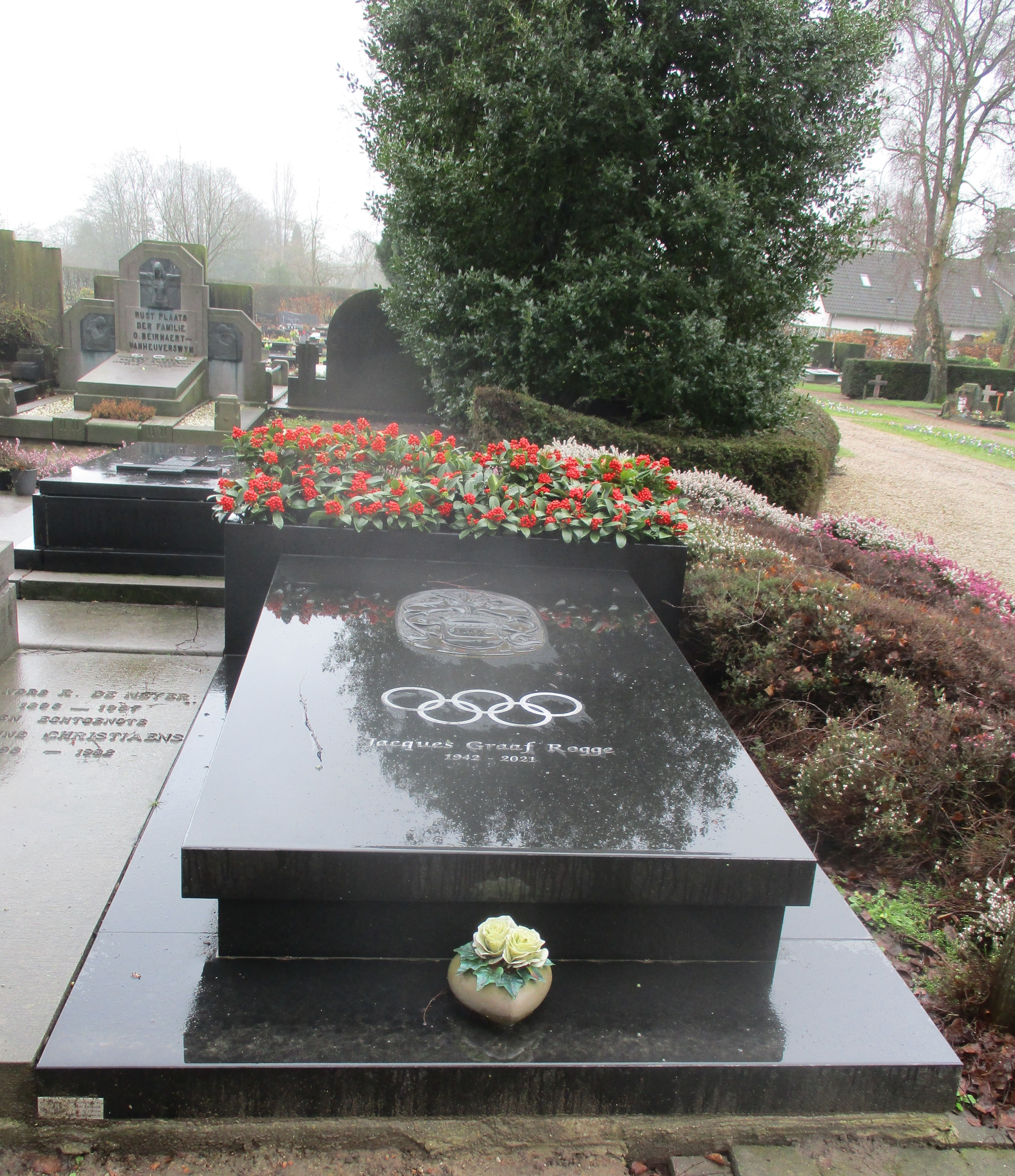
Grave of Jacques Rogge in Sint-Martens-Latem

On 25 February 2014, the Princess Royal presented him with his appointment as an Honorary Knight Commander of the Order of St Michael and St George (KCMG) at Buckingham Palace in London for his years of service to the Olympics and in particular for his work on 2012 London Summer Olympic Games. On 28 April, Rogge was also appointed Special Envoy for Youth Refugees and Sport by United Nations Secretary-General Ban Ki-moon, to help promote sport as an empowerment tool for youth from displaced and refugee communities towards peace, reconciliation, security, health, education, gender equality, and a more inclusive society.

In his free time, Rogge was known to admire modern art and was an avid reader of historical and scientific literature.

On 14 October 2016, British School of Brussels opened its new sports center in Tervuren, Belgium. The building was opened and named after Rogge, titled in his honour as "Jacques Rogge Sports Centre".

In 2017, the International Paralympic Committee awarded Rogge its highest honour the Paralympic Order for saving them from financial disaster. Rogge received the International Fair Play Committee's lifetime achievement award, the Jean Borotra World Fair Play Trophy. The committee decided to name their youth award in honour of Rogge, calling it the Jacques Rogge Fair Play Trophy for The Youth.

== Personal life ==
Rogge married Anne Bovyn, they had two children and two grandchildren.

== Death ==
Rogge died from Parkinson's disease at his home in Deinze, Belgium, on 29 August 2021, at the age of 79.

== Honours and titles ==
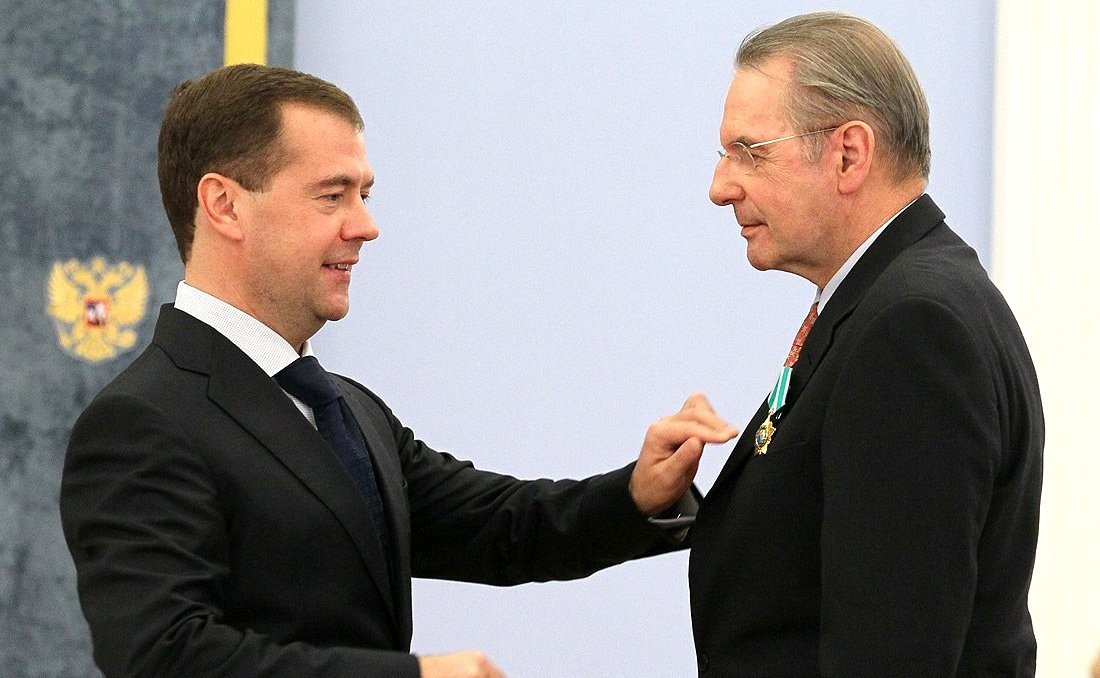
Rogge decorated by Dmitry Medvedev into the Order of Friendship in 2011

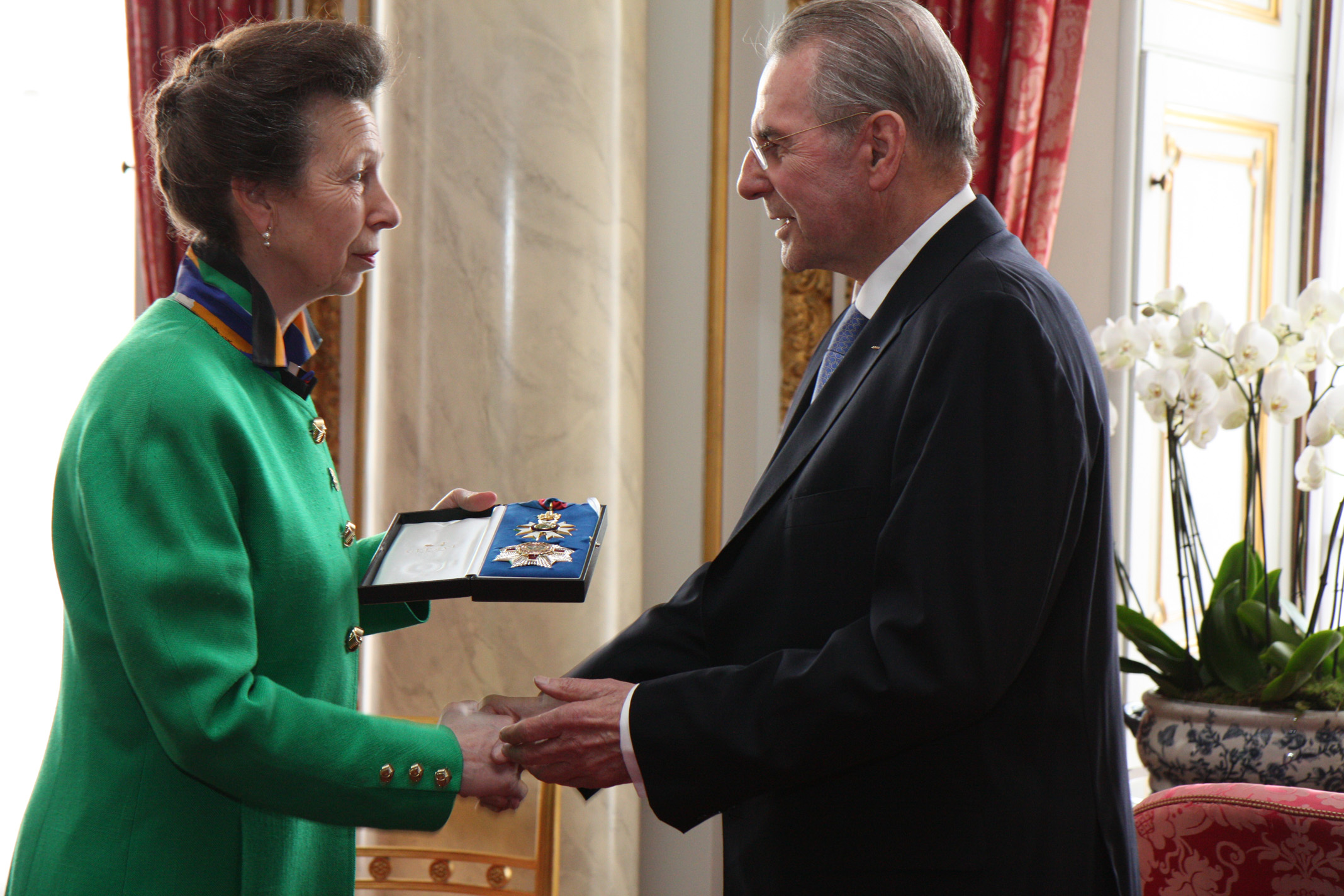
Receiving knighthood from the Princess Royal, 2014

Rogge received these honours and titles in Belgium and abroad for his work:

- 1992: Creation of Knight Rogge, by Royal decree of King Baudouin
- 2002: Creation of Count Rogge, by Royal decree of King Albert II
- 2006: Knight Grand Cross in the Order of Merit of the Italian Republic
- 2006: Order of Prince Yaroslav the Wise (Ukraine)
- 2006: Grand Cross in the Order for Merits to Lithuania
- 2008: Decoration of Honour for Services to the Republic of Austria
- 2010: Order of Merit of Ukraine
- 2010: Order of the Companions of O. R. Tambo (South Africa)
- 2011: Member of the Order of Friendship (Russian Federation)
- 2011: Grand Order of Queen Jelena (Croatia)
- 2011: Officer of the Legion of Honour, by President Sarkozy
- 2012: Grand Officer in the Order of Leopold (Belgium)
- 2013: Grand Cross of the Order of the Crown (Belgium), by Royal decree of 19 September 2013
- 2012: Knight Commander in the Order of Orange-Nassau, by Royal decree of Queen Beatrix
- 2014: Order of St. Michael and St. George (KCMG) (UK), 2014
- 2015: Knight Grand Cross in the Order of Adolphe of Nassau.
- 2013: Gold Olympic Order
- 2013: Honorary President of the International Olympic Committee
- 2017: Paralympic Order

=== Academic degrees ===
Rogge received several honorary degrees (honoris causa) :

- Baku State University, Azerbaijan
- Semmelweis University, Hungary
- École Polytechnique Fédérale de Lausanne, Switzerland
- Józef Piłsudski University of Physical Education in Warsaw, Poland
- University of Southern Denmark
- Lithuanian Sports University
- Ghent University, Belgium in 2001
- Taras Shevchenko National University of Kyiv, Ukraine, in October 2006
- Beijing Sport University, China, on 24 October 2006
- Galileo University, Guatemala, on 30 June 2007
- University of Porto, Portugal, in November 2009
- National Sports Academy of Bulgaria, in January 2009
- University of Oradea, Romania, in September 2010
- Royal Military Academy (Belgium) on 28 October 2010
- KU Leuven, Belgium in 2012
- National University of Ukraine on Physical Education and Sport, in May 2018

Civic offices
Preceded by (Spain) Juan Antonio Samaranch	President of the International Olympic Committee; 2001–2013	Succeeded by (Germany) Thomas Bach
Preceded by Raoul Mollet	President of the Belgian Olympic Committee (BOIC); 1989–1992	Succeeded by Adrien Vanden Eede
