= Olympic Order =

Highest award of the Olympic Movement

- Gold and Silver Olympic Orders
- Awarded for: Contribution to the Olympic Movement
- Presented by: International Olympic Committee

History
- First award: 1975

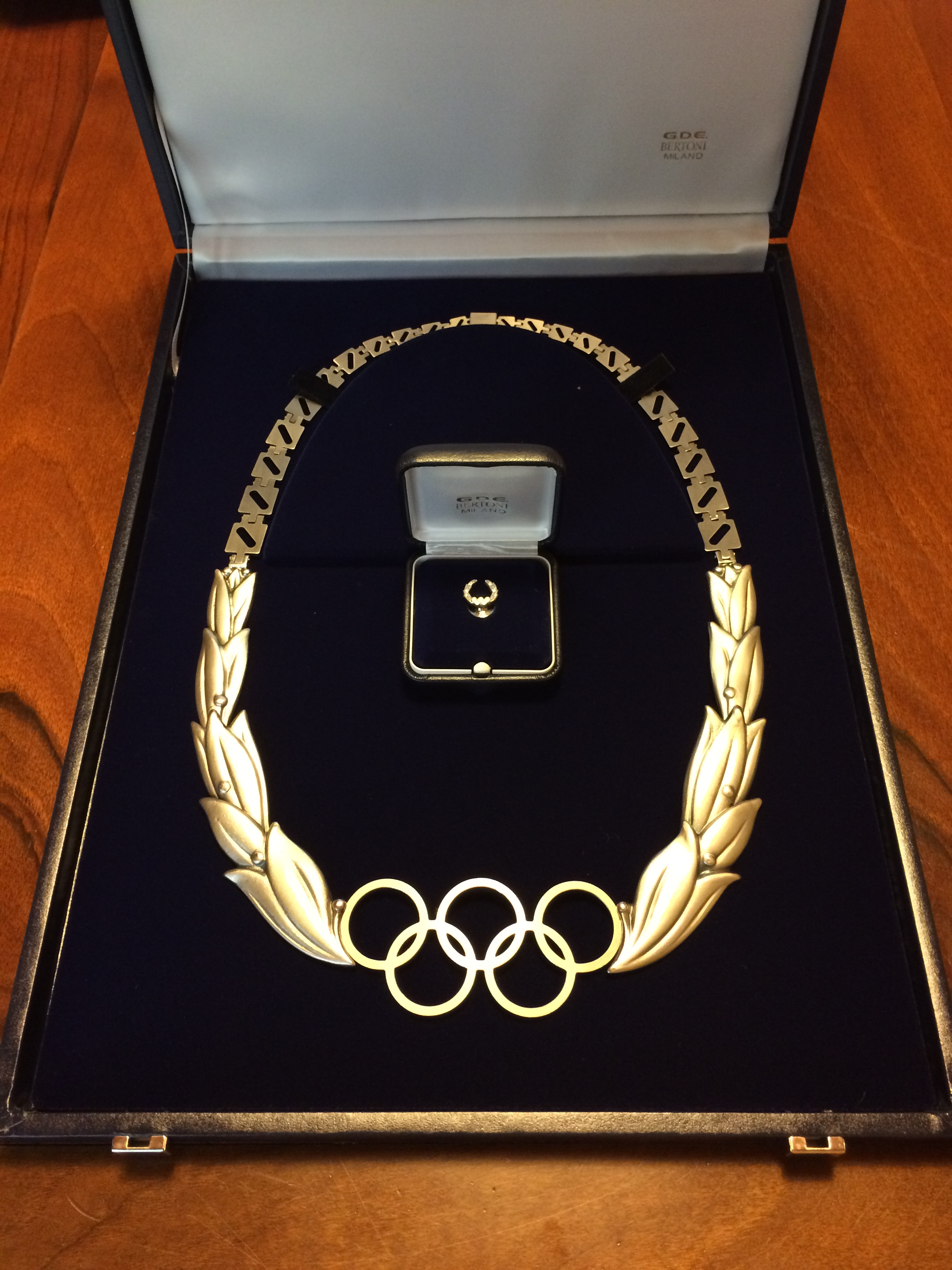
Olympic Order and its miniature badge, produced by GDE Bertoni Milano, Collection Fabio Ferrari

The Olympic Order, established in 1975, is the highest award of the Olympic Movement. It is awarded for particularly distinguished contributions to the Olympic Movement, i.e. recognition of efforts worthy of merit in the cause of sport. Traditionally, the IOC bestows the Olympic Order upon the chief national organiser(s) at the closing ceremony of each respective Olympic Games.

== History ==
The Olympic Order was established in May 1975 by the International Olympic Committee as a successor to the Olympic Diploma of Merit. The Olympic Order originally had three grades (gold, silver and bronze). In 1984, at the 87th IOC Session in Sarajevo (Yugoslavia), it was decided that there would be no distinction between the silver and bronze order.

== Design ==
The insignia of the Olympic Order is in the form of a collar (or chain), in Gold, Silver or Bronze according to grade; the front of the chain depicts the five rings of the Olympic Movement, flanked on either side by kotinos emblem (olive wreath). A lapel badge, in the form of miniature five rings and kotinos in Gold, Silver and Bronze according to grade, is presented to recipients to wear as appropriate.

== Recipients ==
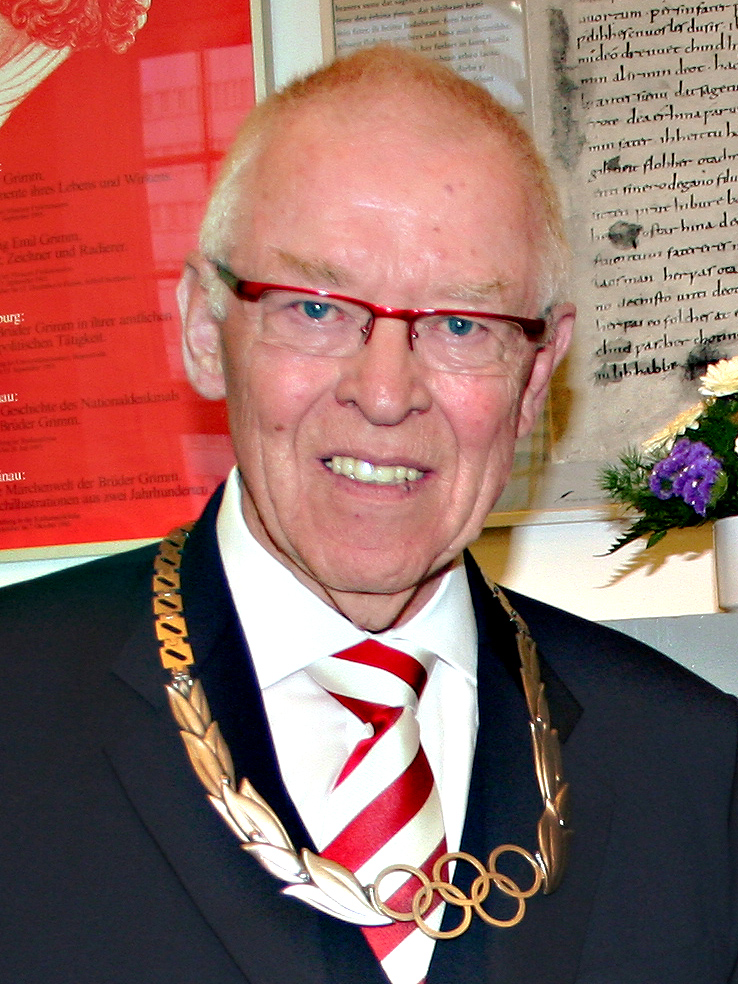
Dr Ulrich Feldhoff sporting his Chain of the Olympic Order

The following is a list of recipients of the Olympic Order. Some no longer have their orders, as they have been withdrawn.

=== Gold Olympic Order ===
Year	Recipient	Country	Note
1975	Avery Brundage	United States	
1980	Lord Killanin	Ireland	
1981	Lord Exeter	United Kingdom	
1981	Pope John Paul II	Vatican City	
1981	Amadou-Mahtar M'Bow	Senegal	
1981	King Olav V	Norway	
1983	Indira Gandhi	India	
1984	Ahmad Shah of Pahang	Malaysia	
1984	Branko Mikulić	Yugoslavia	
1984	François Mitterrand	France	
1984	Peter Ueberroth	United States	
1985	Nicolae Ceauşescu	Romania	
1985	Erich Honecker	East Germany	
1985	King Juan Carlos I	Spain	
1986	Wan Li	China	
1987	King Bhumibol Adulyadej	Thailand	
1987	General Kenan Evren	Turkey	
1987	Todor Zhivkov	Bulgaria	
1988	Prince Rainier III	Monaco	
1988	Prince Bertil Bernadotte	Sweden	
1988	Frank Walter King	Canada	
1988	Mario Vázquez Raña	Mexico	
1988	Park Seh-jik	South Korea	
1989	Raoul Mollet	Belgium	
1989	Emperor Akihito	Japan	
1989	Rafael Hernández Colón	Puerto Rico	
1990	Giulio Andreotti	Italy	
1991	Jean de Beaumont	France	
1991	Yoshiaki Tsutsumi	Japan	
1991	Willi Daume	West Germany	
1992	Pasqual Maragall	Spain	
1992	Carlos Arthur Nuzman	Brazil	
1992	Michel Barnier	France	
1992	Javier Gómez-Navarro	Spain	
1992	José Miguel Abad	Spain	
1992	Jean-Claude Killy	France	
1992	Jordi Pujol	Spain	
1992	Leopoldo Rodés	Spain	
1992	Carlos Salinas de Gotari	Mexico	
1992	Narcís Serra	Spain	
1992	Javier Solana	Spain	
1993	Boris Yeltsin	Russia	
1994	Gerhard Heiberg	Norway	
1994	Richard von Weizsäcker	Germany	
1994	Nelson Mandela	South Africa	
1994	Joaquín Leguina	Spain	
1994	Mauno Koivisto	Finland	
1994	King Harald V of Norway	Norway	
1994	Queen Sonja of Norway	Norway	
1995	Árpád Göncz	Hungary	
1995	Robert Mugabe	Zimbabwe	
1996	Billy Payne	United States	
1996	Konstantinos Stephanopoulos	Greece	
1996	Adolphus Drewery	United States	
1996	Andrew Young	United States	
1996	Islam Karimov	Uzbekistan	
1997	Blaise Compaore	Burkina Faso	
1997	Omar Bongo	Gabon	
1997	Nursultan Nazarbaev	Kazakhstan	
1997	Elias Hrawi	Lebanon	
1997	Ernesto Zedillo Ponce de Léon	Mexico	
1997	Aleksander Kwaśniewski	Poland	
1997	Suleyman Demirel	Turkey	
1998	Kim Dae-jung	South Korea	
1998	Jean, Grand Duke of Luxembourg	Luxembourg	
1998	Eishiro Saito	Japan	
1999	Eduard Shevardnadze	Georgia	
2000	Adolf Ogi	Switzerland	
2000	Lowitja O'Donoghue	Australia	
2000	John Coates	Australia	
2001	Sultan Qaboos bin Said al Said	Oman	
2001	Goh Chok Tong	Singapore	
2001	Vladimir Putin	Russia	Withdrawn on 28 February 2022
2001	Juan Antonio Samaranch	Spain	
2001	Abdoulaye Wade	Senegal	
2002	Fraser Bullock	United States	
2002	Jacques Chirac	France	
2002	Kéba Mbaye	Senegal	
2002	Mitt Romney	United States	
2002	Irwin Belk	United States	
2003	Emile Lahoud	Lebanon	
2003	John Howard	Australia	
2004	Gianna Angelopoulos-Daskalaki	Greece	
2004	Costas Karamanlis	Greece	
2004	Abdelaziz Bouteflika	Algeria	
2004	Johannes Rau	Germany	
2004	Martinos Simitsek	Greece	
2005	Theodore Angelopoulos	Greece	
2006	Valentino Castellani	Italy	
2007	Kofi Annan	Ghana	
2008	Liu Qi	China	
2009	Jack Poole	Canada	Posthumously awarded
2010	S. R. Nathan	Singapore	
2010	Lee Hsien Loong	Singapore	
2010	John Furlong	Canada	
2012	Lord Coe	United Kingdom	
2012	Lord Deighton	United Kingdom	
2013	King Willem-Alexander	Netherlands	
2013	Count Jacques Rogge	Belgium	
2013	King Felipe VI	Spain	
2013	Pope Francis	Vatican City	
2013	Xi Jinping	China	
2014	Dmitry Chernyshenko	Russia	Withdrawn on 28 February 2022
2014	Dmitry Kozak	Russia	Withdrawn on 28 February 2022
2015	Margareta of Romania	Romania	
2016	Carlos Arthur Nuzman	Brazil	
2018	Lee Hee-beom	South Korea	
2018	Fernando Botero	Colombia	
2018	Moon Jae-in	South Korea	
2018	Mauricio Macri	Argentina	
2020	Prokopis Pavlopoulos	Greece	
2020	Shinzo Abe	Japan	
2021	Seiko Hashimoto	Japan	
2021	Yoshihide Suga	Japan	
2021	Yuriko Koike	Japan	
2022	Sun Chunlan	China	
2022	Cai Qi	China	
2022	Andrzej Duda	Poland	
2024	Tony Estanguet	France	
2024	Emmanuel Macron	France	
2025	Thomas Bach	Germany	
2026	Sergio Mattarella	Italy	
2026	Giorgia Meloni	Italy	
2026	Ahmadou Al Aminou Lo	Senegal	
2026	Mamadou Diagna Ndiaye	Senegal	

=== Silver Olympic Order ===
Year	Recipient	Country	Note
1975	Mr. Ryotaro Azuma	Japan	
1975	Mr. Miguel de Capriles	United States	
1975	Lieutenant-Colonel Rudyard Russell	United Kingdom	
1976	Mr. Paul Anspach	Belgium	
1976	Mr. Harold Austad	New Zealand	
1976	Mr. Albert Demaurex	Switzerland	
1976	Mr. Dan Ferris	United States	
1976	Mr. Jesse Owens	United States	
1976	Mr. Héctor Paysse Reyes	Uruguay	
1976	Mr. Walter Wülfing	West Germany	
1977	Colonel Sir Michael Ansell	United Kingdom	
1977	Mrs. Inger Frith	Denmark/United Kingdom	
1977	Mr. Sven Låftman	Sweden	
1977	Mr. Anselmo López	Spain	
1977	Rudolf Nemetschke	Austria	
1977	Mr. Seiji Tabata	Japan	
1978	Prince Bertil Bernadotte	Sweden	
1978	Bâtonnier René Bondoux	France	
1978	Colonel Domingos de Sousa	Portugal	
1978	Mr. Falih Fahmi	Iraq	
1978	Mr. John Emrys Lloyd	United Kingdom	
1978	Mr. Adriano Rodoni	Italy	
1978	Mr. Mario Vázquez Raña	Mexico	
1979	Haj Omar Boucetta	Morocco	
1979	General Gustaf Dyrssen	Sweden	
1979	Mr. Mikio Oda	Japan	
1979	Er. Harold Madison Wright	Canada	
1980	Professor Arnold H. Beckett	United Kingdom	
1980	Er. Pablo Cagnasso	Argentina	
1980	Mr. Franco Carraro	Italy	
1980	Mr. Benito Castejón	Spain	
1980	Mr. Claude Collard	France	
1980	Professor Albert Dirix	Belgium	
1980	Sir Denis Follows	United Kingdom	
1980	Mr. Sydney Grange	Australia	
1980	Mr. Kurt Hasler	Switzerland	
1980	Mr. Frederick Holder	United Kingdom	
1980	Lord Howell	United Kingdom	
1980	Colonel Raoul Mollet	Belgium	
1980	Mr. Renato William Jones	United Kingdom	
1980	Mr. Ignati Novikov	Soviet Union	
1980	Mr. Charles Palmer	United Kingdom	
1980	Mr. Henri Pouret	France	
1980	Mr. Amilcare Rotta	Italy	
1980	Mr. Anton Skataretiko	Yugoslavia	
1980	Mr. Bertil Sallfors	Sweden	
1980	Mr. Yoshiyuki Tsuruta	Japan	
1981	Mr. Gérard d'Aboville	France	
1981	Mr. Roone Arledge	United States	
1981	Mr. Jacinto Balleste	Spain	
1981	Mr. Rafael Barquero Chaves	Costa Rica	
1981	Mr. Árpád Bogsch	United States	
1981	Mr. Charles de Coquereaumont	France	
1981	Mr. David Coward	United Kingdom	
1981	Max Danz	West Germany	
1981	Mr. Jean-Pascal Delamuraz	Switzerland	
1981	Mr. Henry Joseph Dieme	Senegal	
1981	Mr. Bo Ekelund	Sweden	
1981	Mr. Pierre Ferri	France	
1981	Mr. Jacques Goddet	France	
1981	Mr. Gísli Halldórsson	Iceland	
1981	Harold W. Henning	United States	
1981	Mrs. Hideko Hyodo	Japan	
1981	Mr. Enrikas Juskhevitsus	Soviet Union	
1981	Mr. Kurt Møller	Denmark	
1981	Ms. Elena Mukhina	Soviet Union	
1981	Mr. Desmond O'Sullivan	Ireland	
1981	Mr. Adriaan Paulen	Netherlands	
1981	Mr. Adriano Rodoni	Italy	
1981	Mr. Abdel Moneim Wahby	Egypt	
1982	Prince Franz Joseph II	Liechtenstein	
1982	Mr. František Kroutil	Czechoslovakia	
1982	Mr. Paavo Mikko Honkajuuri	Finland	
1982	Prince Tsuneyoshi Takeda	Japan	
1982	Mr. José Beracasa	Venezuela	
1982	Sultan Hamengkubuwono IX	Indonesia	
1982	General Sven Thofelt	Sweden	
1982	Mr. Avinash Chandra Chatterji	India	
1982	Mr. José Ramón Fernández	Cuba	
1982	Mr. Haim Glowinsky	Israel	
1982	Mr. Ichiro Hatta	Japan	
1982	Mr. Clarence H. Johnson	United States	
1982	Mr. Robert Kane	United States	
1982	Mr. Alois Lugger	Austria	
1982	Mr. Fernando Luis Pereira Machado	Portugal	
1982	Mr. Paul-Rene Martin	Switzerland	
1982	Mr. Trendafil Martinski	Bulgaria	
1982	Mr. Edgar Mercier	France	
1982	Mr. László Papp	Hungary	
1982	Mr. João Carlos de Oliveira	Brazil	
1982	Mr. Giovanni Romagna	Italy	
1982	Mr. Arnaldo de Oliveira Sales	Hong Kong	
1982	Mr. Angel Solakov	Bulgaria	
1982	Mr. Habib Thiam	Senegal	
1982	Mr. Jukka Uunila	Finland	
1983	Mr. Kouassi Angama	Ivory Coast	
1983	Mr. Georges Athanassiadis	Greece	
1983	Sir Gerald Cash	Bahamas	
1983	Arpad Csanadi	Hungary	
1983	Mrs. Betty Cuthbert	Australia	
1983	Mr. Eduardo Dibos	Peru	
1983	Mr. Laurent Dona-Fologo	Ivory Coast	
1983	Lieutenant-General Marin Dragnea	Romania	
1983	Mr. Jean Drapeau	Canada	
1983	Mrs. Ilona Elek	Hungary	
1983	Mr. Massoud Ahmded El-Zantouti	Libya	
1983	Mr. Manfred Ewald	East Germany	
1983	Mrs. Marie-Thérèse Eyquem	France	
1983	Mr. Sisto Favre	Italy	
1983	Mr. Edgar Fried	Austria	
1983	Abdel Halim Muhammad	Sudan	
1983	Mr. Kim Taik-soo	South Korea	
1983	Mrs. Galina Kulakova	Soviet Union	
1983	Mr. Leopoldo de Leon	Panama	
1983	Mr. Aleksandr Medved	Soviet Union	
1983	Mr. Roger Menard	France	
1983	Mr. Chūhei Nambu	Japan	
1983	Mr. Robert F. Osborne	Canada	
1983	Mr. Javier Ostos	Spain	
1983	Mr. Julius Lockington Patching	Australia	
1983	Mr. Berge Philips	Australia	
1983	Mr. Gaotang Rong	China	
1983	Mr. Victor Saneev	Soviet Union	
1983	Mr. Katsuji Shibata	Japan	
1983	Mr. Sergei Chalibashvili	Soviet Union	
1983	Mrs. Lidiya Skoblikova	Soviet Union	
1984	Mr. Abdelhamid Rachdi Alami	Morocco	
1984	Mr. Abílio Ferreira d'Almeida	Brazil	
1984	Mr. Luis Azemar Puig de la Bellacasa	Spain	
1984	Mr. Motohiko Ban	Japan	
1984	Mrs. Herma Bauma	Austria	
1984	Mr. Bo Bengston	Sweden	
1984	Mr. Jean Borotra	France	
1984	Mr. Paolo Cappabianca	Italy	
1984	Mr. Juan José Castillo	Spain	
1984	Mr. Harry H. Cavan	United Kingdom	
1984	Ms. Nadia Comăneci	Romania	
1984	Mr. George Craig	New Zealand	
1984	Beppe Croce	Italy	
1984	Mr. Sandy Duncan	United Kingdom	
1984	Mr. Suat Erler	Turkey	
1984	Mr. Rene Frank	Belgium	
1984	Mr. Akira Fujita	Japan	
1984	Mr. Antonin Himl	Czechoslovakia	
1984	Mr. Pierre Hirschy	Switzerland	
1984	Mr. Bert Isatitsch	Austria	
1984	Mr. Pal Kovacs	Hungary	
1984	Mr. Paul Libaud	France	
1984	Mr. Hero Lupescu	Romania	
1984	Colonel F. Don Miller	United States	
1984	Mr. Julio Enrique Monagas	Puerto Rico	
1984	Mr. Hadj Ibrahim Mbomba Njoya	Cameroon	
1984	Mr. Renzo Nostini	Italy	
1984	Mr. Fred B. Oberlander	Canada	
1984	Mr. Nelson Paillou	France	
1984	Mr. Marian Renke	Poland	
1984	Mr. Walter J.M.A. von Rosberg	Netherlands Antilles	
1984	Mr. Zhong Shitong	China	
1984	Mr. Olegário Vazquez Rafia	Mexico	
1984	Mrs. Helene Ahrweiler	France	
1984	Mr. Abdul Hameed Al-Hajji	Kuwait	
1984	Mr. Aldo Bergamaschi	Italy	
1984	Mr. Fred Blay	Liberia	
1984	Mr. Emeric Blum	Yugoslavia	
1984	Mr. Tom Bradley	United States	
1984	Mr. Gian-Carlo Brusati	Italy	
1984	Mr. Miroslav Cerar	Yugoslavia	
1984	Mr. Alain Danet	France	
1984	Mr. Horst Dassler	West Germany	
1984	Mr. Abdelaziz Elshafei	Egypt	
1984	Mr. Milan Ercegan	Yugoslavia	
1984	Mr. Shunji Fujii	Japan	
1984	Mr. Knolly Henderson	Trinidad and Tobago	
1984	Mr. Paul Högberg	Sweden	
1984	Mr. Samwel Mbogo Kamau	Kenya	
1984	Mr. Ahmed Karabegovic	Yugoslavia	
1984	Mr. Kenjiro Mizuno	Japan	
1984	Mr. Primo Nebiolo	Italy	
1984	Mr. Günther Sabetzki	West Germany	
1984	Mr. Keith Shervington	Jamaica	
1984	Mr. Baghadi Si-Mohamed	Algeria	
1984	Mr. Anto Sucic	Yugoslavia	
1984	Mr. Artur Takac	Yugoslavia	
1984	Mr. Stanko Tomic	Yugoslavia	
1984	Mr. Harry Usher	United States	
1984	Mr. Uglijesa Uzelac	Yugoslavia	
1984	Mr. Paul Ziffren	United States	
1985	Sir Adetokunbo Ademola	Nigeria	
1985	Mr. Alexa Haralambie	Romania	
1985	Sheikh Isa bin Rashed Al Kalifa	Bahrain	
1985	Mr. Hanji Aoki	Japan	
1985	Mr. Abdel Azim Ashry	Egypt	
1985	Mr. Tsegaw Ayele	Ethiopia	
1985	Mr. Edmund W. Barker	Singapore	
1985	Mr. Domenico Bruschi	San Marino	
1985	Mrs. Christine Caron	France	
1985	Mr. Bud Greenspan	United States	
1985	Mr. Józef Grudzień	Poland	
1985	Mr. Hermann Jannsen	West Germany	
1985	Mr. John B. Kelly Jr.	United States	
1985	Mr. Ferdinand Siregar Mangombar	Indonesia	
1985	Mr. Kenkichi Oshima	Japan	
1985	Lord Porritt	New Zealand	
1985	Mr. Bedřich Poula	Czechoslovakia	
1985	Mr. Ludwig Prokop	Austria	
1985	Mr. André Gustavo Richer	Brazil	
1985	Mr. Raimundo Saporta	Spain	
1985	Mr. William Simon	United States	
1985	Mr. Borislav Stanković	Yugoslavia	
1985	Mr. Josep Lluís Vilaseca	Spain	
1985	Mr. Walter Wasservogel	Austria	
1985	Mr. Jean Weymann	Switzerland	
1985	Mr. Lev Yashin	Soviet Union	
1986	Mr. Carlos Osório de Almeida	Brazil	
1986	Mr. Lachezar Avramov	Bulgaria	
1986	Mr. Mahmoud Ba	Mauritania	
1986	Mr. Bernhard Baier	West Germany	
1986	Mrs. Liselotl Diem	West Germany	
1986	Mr. Justin Durand	Benin	
1986	Mr. Issac Froimovich	Chile	
1986	Mr. Julio Gerlcin Comelin	Colombia	
1986	Mr. Carlos de Godó	Spain	
1986	Mr. Roberto C. Goizueta	United States	
1986	Mr. Boris Gueorguiev	Bulgaria	
1986	Mr. Cornelius Kerdel	Netherlands	
1986	Mr. Antoine Khoui	Lebanon	
1986	Mr. Jean-Arnould Leew	Belgium	
1986	Air Vice Marshal C. L. Metha	India	
1986	Mr. Nikolaos Nissiotis	Greece	
1986	Mr.John Akii-Bua	Uganda	
1986	Mr. Pedro Perez Duenas	Cuba	
1986	Mr. Ahmed Mohammed Qaatabi	South Yemen	
1986	Mr. Max Rinkenburger	West Germany	
1986	Mr. Douglas F. Roby	United States	
1986	Mr. Julian K. Roosevelt	United States	
1986	Mr. Roger Rousseau	Canada	
1986	Mr. Ricardo José Russomando	Argentina	
1986	Mr. Andrey Starovoytov	Soviet Union	
1986	Mr. William Thayer Tutt	United States	
1986	Mr. Tadeusz Ulatowski	Poland	
1986	Mr. Georges Vichos	Greece	
1986	Mr. George Wieczisk	East Germany	
1986	Mr. Huang Zhong	China	
1987	Mr. Francisco Ferreira Alves	Portugal	
1987	Mr. Abdel Moneim El Bah	Libya	
1987	Mr. Boris Bakrač	Yugoslavia	
1987	Mr. John Joseph Brown	Australia	
1987	Mr. Gavrila Barani	Romania	
1987	Mr. Ramiro Tavares Gonçalves	Brazil	
1987	Mr. Rudolf Hellmann	East Germany	
1987	Mr. Chen Jingkai	China	
1987	Mr. Alberto Juantorena	Cuba	
1987	Mr. Todor Zhivkov	Bulgaria	
1987	Mr. Erich Kamper	Austria	
1987	Mr. L. N. Khurana	India	
1987	Mr. Jean-Claude Killy	France	
1987	Mr. Philip Othmar Krumm	United States	
1987	Colonel Zdzisław Krzyszkowiak	Poland	
1987	Mr. Li Menghua	China	
1987	Mr. Geoffrey de Navacelle	France	
1987	Mr. Sergio Orsi	Italy	
1987	Mr. Lassina Palenfo	Ivory Coast	
1987	Mr. Marcel Pasche	Switzerland	
1987	Mr. Janusz Przedpełski	Poland	
1987	Mr. Haluk San	Turkey	
1987	Mr. Teofilo Stevenson	Cuba	
1987	Mr. Vladimir Stoychev	Bulgaria	
1987	Mr. Leon Štukelj	Yugoslavia	
1987	Mr. Brian Wightman	Fiji	
1988	Mr. Ruben Acosta	Mexico	
1988	Mr. Constantin Andrianov	Soviet Union	
1988	Mr. Francisco Alguersuari Durán	Spain	
1988	Mrs. Eileen Anderson	United Kingdom	
1988	Mr. Juan José Castillo	Spain	
1988	Mr. Reiner Klimke	West Germany	
1988	Mr. Juan de la Llera Trens	Spain	
1988	Mr. Bill Pratt	Canada	
1988	Mr. Fernando Riba	Spain	
1988	Mr. Anisio Silva Rocha	Brazil	
1988	Joszef Sir	Hungary	
1988	Katarina Witt	East Germany	
1988	Ralph Klein	Canada	
1988	Jerzy Kukuczka	Poland	
1988	Antonio Mariscal	Mexico	
1988	Josef Neckermann	West Germany	
1988	Jasdev Singh	India	
1988	Taieb Houichi	Tunisia	
1988	Ante Lambasa	Yugoslavia	
1988	Wolf Lyberg	Sweden	
1988	Frederick Ruegsegger	United States	
1989	Larisa Latynina	Soviet Union	
1990	Ivan Patzaichin	Romania	
1990	Reizo Koike	Japan	
1990	Naoto Tajima	Japan	
1992	Ludovit Komadel	Czechoslovakia	
1992	Jesús Alfonso Elizondo Nájera	Mexico	
1994	Vladimir Krivtsov	Russia	
1994	Shane Gould	Australia	
1995	Eddy Merckx	Belgium	
1995	Miguel Indurain	Spain	
1995	Jerald M. Jordan	United States	
1997	Karl Lennartz	Germany	
1997	Oscar Schmidt	Brazil	
1997	Ian Buchanan	United Kingdom	
1998	Alexander Gomelsky	Russia	
1998	Geoffrey Henke	Australia	
1998	Makoto Kobayashi	Japan	
1998	Tasuku Tsukada	Japan	
1998	Goro Yoshimura	Japan	
1998	Joan Creus	Spain	
1999	Brian Tobin	Australia	
1999	Prince Abdul Hakeem Jefri Bolkiah	Brunei	
2000	Prof. Lowitja O'Donoghue	Australia	
2000	Norman May	Australia	
2001	Ton Bijkerk	Netherlands	
2001	Harry Gordon	Australia	
2001	Cathy Freeman	Australia	
2001	Bill Mallon	United States	
2001	Kazuyoshi Funaki	Japan	
2001	Bjørn Dæhlie	Norway	
2002	Peter Montgomery	Australia	
2002	Shoichi Tomita	Japan	
2003	Mool Chand Chowhan	India	
2004	Robert Kocharian	Armenia	
2007	Marjorie Jackson-Nelson	Australia	
2008	He Zhenliang	China	
2008	Liu Jingmin	China	
2008	Deng Pufang	China	
2008	Chen Zhili	China	
2010	Teo Chee Hean	Singapore	
2010	Ng Eng Hen	Singapore	
2010	Vivian Balakrishnan	Singapore	
2010	Tan Eng Liang	Singapore	
2010	Chris Chan	Singapore	
2010	Goh Kee Nguan	Singapore	
2010	Francis Chong	Singapore	
2010	Eric Tan Huck Gim	Singapore	
2010	Les McDonald	Canada	
2010	Michael A. Chambers	Canada	
2010	Nodar Kumaritashvili	Georgia	Posthumously awarded
2011	Fernando Lima Bello	Portugal	
2011	Kip Keino	Kenya	
2011	Vilnis Baltiņš	Latvia	
2012	Gary Anderson	United States	
2012	Sir Keith Mills	United Kingdom	
2012	Lord Moynihan	United Kingdom	
2012	Eiichi Kawatei	Japan	
2015	Lord Tevita Poasi Tupou	Tonga	
2015	Irina Viner	Russia	
2016	Edson Arantes do Nascimento	Brazil	
2016	Ilse Bechthold	Germany	
2016	Julio Maglione	Uruguay	
2016	Anton Geesink	Netherlands	Posthumously awarded
2016	Reynaldo González López	Cuba	Posthumously awarded
2016	Peter Tallberg	Finland	Posthumously awarded
2016	Risto Nieminen	Finland	
2016	Vlade Divac	Serbia	
2016	Narayana Ramachandran	India	
2018	Yeo Hyung-koo	South Korea	
2018	Kim Jae-youl	South Korea	
2018	Kim Joo-ho	South Korea	
2021	Toshirō Mutō	Japan	
2022	Gou Zhongwen	China	
2022	Chen Jining	China	
2022	Wang Zhengpu	China	
2022	Zhang Jiandong	China	
2022	Han Zirong	China	
2024	Anne Hidalgo	France	
2024	Valérie Pécresse	France	
2024	Amélie Oudéa-Castéra	France	
2024	Patrick Ollier	France	
2024	Stéphane Troussel	France	
2024	Michel Cadot	France	
2024	Marc Guillaume	France	
2024	Étienne Thobois	France	
2024	Michaël Aloïsio	France	
2026	Djirèye Clotilde Coly	Senegal	
2026	Déthié Fall	Senegal	
2026	Ibrahima Wade	Senegal	

=== Bronze Olympic Order ===
Year	Recipient	Country	Note
1975	Mr. Charles Debeur	Belgium	
1975	Mr. Gyula Hegyi	Hungary	
1975	Mr. John Kasyoka	Kenya	
1975	Mrs. Lia Manoliu	Romania	
1975	Mrs. Ellen Preis	Austria	
1975	Jacques Thiébault	France	
1976	Mr. Helmut Behrendt	East Germany	
1976	Mr. Antonio dos Reis Carneiro	Brazil	
1976	Mr. Walter Jhung	South Korea	
1976	Mr. Abderrahman Khatib	Morocco	
1976	Mrs. Zofia Mironova	Soviet Union	
1976	Mr. Kleanthis Palaiologos	Greece	
1976	Mr. Haim Wein	Israel	
1977	Mr. Gunnar Hansen	Denmark	
1977	Mrs. Nadia Lekarska	Bulgaria	
1977	Mr. Edoardo Mangiarotti	Italy	
1977	Mr. Alberto Nariño Cheyne	Colombia	
1977	Mr. Christian d'Oriola	France	
1977	Mr. Dutta Ray	India	
1977	Mr. Roberto Richards Aguiar	Cuba	
1977	Mr. René de Raeve	Belgium	
1978	Mr. Zafar Ali	Pakistan	
1978	Mihailo Andrejević	Yugoslavia	
1978	Mrs. Ludmilla Tourischeva	Soviet Union	
1978	Colonel Hassine Hamouda	Tunisia	
1978	Mr. Harald Jespersen	Denmark	
1978	Mrs. Ingrid Keller de Schiavoni	Guatemala	
1978	Mr. Surjit Singh Majithia	India	
1978	Mr. Paulo Martins Meira	Brazil	
1978	Mr. Al Oerter	United States	
1978	Mr. Michel Ravarino	Monaco	
1978	Mr. Charles Riolo	Switzerland	
1978	Mr. Yoshinori Suzuki	Japan	
1978	Mr. Hugo Virgilio Tedin	Argentina	
1978	Mr. José Gamarra Zorrilla	Bolivia	
1979	Mr. Jeronymo Baptista Bastos	Brazil	
1979	Mr. Alfredo Hohagen Díez Canseco	Peru	
1979	Mrs. Maria Kwaśniewska	Poland	
1979	Colonel Marcel Leclef	Belgium	
1979	Mr. Imre Németh	Hungary	
1979	Mrs. Emmy Schwabe	Austria	
1979	Mr. Otto Szymiczek	Greece	
1979	Mrs. Lydia Zanchi	Switzerland	
1980	Mr. Sigge Bergman	Sweden	
1980	Mrs. Elisabeth Ferris	United Kingdom	
1980	Mrs. Dawn Fraser	Australia	
1980	Mr. Alex Erere	United Kingdom	
1980	Mrs. Anita DeFrantz	United States	
1980	Mr. Jean-Claude Ganga	Congo	
1980	Mr. Marcello Garroni	Italy	
1980	Mr. Michel Henault	France	
1980	Mr. John Hennessy	United Kingdom	
1980	Mr. Luis E. Hurtado	Panama	
1980	Mr. Joseph Jungmann	Czechoslovakia	
1980	Mr. Clare McDermott	Canada	
1980	Mr. Donato Martucci	Italy	
1980	Mr. Geoffrey Miller	United Kingdom	
1980	Mr. Robert Pariente	France	
1980	Mr. John Rodda	United Kingdom	
1980	Mr. Hussein Sejean	Lebanon	
1980	Mr. Walter Siegenthaler	Switzerland	
1980	Mr. Mustapha Thraya	Tunisia	
1980	Mr. Alexander Yermakov	Soviet Union	
1981	Mr. Slaheddine Baly	Tunisia	
1981	Mr. Max Bangerter	Switzerland	
1981	Brigadier Henrique Alves Callado	Portugal	
1981	Mr. Gregor Hradetzky	Austria	
1981	Mr. Károly Kárpáti	Hungary	
1981	J. Raymond Owen	United Kingdom	
1981	Mrs. Irina Rodnina	Soviet Union	
1981	Mr. Kenneth A. Ryan	Ireland	
1981	Mrs. Irena Szewińska	Poland	
1981	Mr. Eduardo Yáñez Zavala	Chile	
1982	Mr. Waldemar Baszanowski	Poland	
1982	Mr. Jaime Munoz Camposano	Ecuador	
1982	Mr. João da Costa	Brazil	
1982	Mr. Paul Elvstrøm	Denmark	
1982	Mr. Sinan Erdem	Turkey	
1982	Mr. Giuseppe Sabelli Fioretti	Italy	
1982	Mr. Gert Fredriksson	Sweden	
1982	Mr. Arild Honne	Norway	
1982	Mr. Sixten Jernberg	Sweden	
1982	Mr. Leonid Khomenkov	Soviet Union	
1982	Mr. Guillermo Montoya Sanchez	Mexico	
1982	Ridha Mrad	Tunisia	
1982	Mr. Luis Chiriboga Parra	Ecuador	
1982	Mr. E. Howard Radford	Canada	
1982	Mr. Albert Riethausen	West Germany	
1982	Mr. Donald Rowlands	New Zealand	
1982	Mr. Toni Sailer	Austria	
1982	Mr. Vladimir Smirnov	Soviet Union	
1982	Mr. Ulrich Wehling	East Germany	
1982	Mr. D. J. Williams	Bermuda	
1983	Mr. Antônio Carlos Almeida Braga	Brazil	
1983	Mr. Nikolai Gueorguiev	Bulgaria	
1983	Mr. Nigel Hacking	United Kingdom	
1983	Mr. Erhard Georg Friedrich Hoehne	East Germany	
1983	Mr. Guipro Koffi	Ivory Coast	
1983	Antonio Losada	Chile	
1983	Mr. Raden Maladi	Indonesia	
1983	Mr. Janusz Piewcewicz	Poland	
1983	Mr. Yücel Seçkiner	Turkey	
1983	Mrs. Esther Roth-Shahamorov	Israel	
1984	Mr. Francisco Alguersuari Durán	Spain	
1984	Mr. Duarte Manuel de Almeida Bello	Portugal	
1984	Mr. Siegfried Brietzke	West Germany	
1984	Mr. Muhammad Naqi Butt	Pakistan	
1984	Mr. Bogomil Nonev	Bulgaria	
1984	Mr. Alberto Passadore	Uruguay	
1984	Mr. Jozsef Szalay	Hungary	
1984	Mr. Ashenafi Youria	Ethiopia	

=== Recipients with missing data ===
Following is the list of recipients of Olympic Order with some missing data like year of award, country and colour of award.

Year	Recipient	Country	Color	Note
1988	Manfred von Brauchitsch	West Germany		
1988	Arne B. Mollén	Norway		
1988	Mustapha Larfaoui	Algeria		
1988	Aladár Gerevich	Hungary		
1989	Larisa Latynina	Soviet Union		
1990	Lee Kun-hee	South Korea		
1990	Jonathan Janson	United Kingdom		
1990	Rudolf Kárpáti	Hungary		
1990	Lamine Diack	Senegal		
1990	Asnoldo Devonish	Venezuela		
1991	Ioan Kunst-Ghermănescu	Romania		
1992	Hassan Agabani	Sudan		
1992	José Azcona	Mexico		
1992	Jorge Herrera Barona	Colombia		
1992	Mário Carvalho Pini	Brazil		
1992	Itzhak Caspi	Israel		
1992	Vahit Colakoglu	Turkey		
1992	Evie Dennis	United States		
1992	Deszo Gyarmati	Hungary		
1992	Kurt Heller	Australia		Awarded posthumously
1992	Raul Ibarra Zapata	Mexico		
1992	Viacheslav I. Koloskov	Russia		
1992	Gaoussou Kone	Ivory Coast		
1992	Carlos Pardo	Spain		
1992	Mario Pescante	Italy		
1992	Baaron Pittenger	United States		
1992	Eduardo Airaldi Rivarola	Peru		
1992	Carlos Salinas de Gortari	Mexico		
1992	Gottfried Schoedl	Austria		
1992	Gursewak Singh	India		
1992	Prof. Nikos Yalouris	Greece		
1992	Mrs. Caizhen Zhang	China		
1993	Jacques Blanc	France		
1993	Anna Sinilkina	Russia	Silver	
1993	Ted Stevens	United States		
1993	Jordi Pujol	Spain		
1993	Dražen Petrović	Croatia		Posthumously awarded
1994	Vladimir Krivcov	Russia		
1996	Christian Erb	Switzerland		
1996	Sir John Walker	New Zealand		
1996	Vladimir Maksimov	Russia		
1997	Chris de Broglio	South Africa		
1997	Hendrika Mastenbroek	Netherlands		
1997	Roy Jones Jr.	United States		
1997	Bob Barney	Canada		Establishing the International Centre for Olympic Studies
1998	Frédy Girardet	Switzerland		
1998	Chung Ju-yung	South Korea		
1998	Wolf-Dieter Montag	Germany		
1998	Erica Terpstra	Netherlands		
1998	Artūras Poviliūnas	Lithuania		
1999	Alexander Tikhonov	Russia		
1999	Steffi Graf	Germany		
1999	Antonio Spallino	Italy		
1999	Bertrand Piccard	Switzerland		
1999	Brian Jones	England		
1999	Frederic Prieto i Caballé	Spain		
2000	Res Brügger			
2000	Alberto Tomba	Italy		
2000	David Coleman	England		
2000	Alida van den Bos	Netherlands		
2001	Albert Scharf			
2001	Raymond Hahn	France		
2001	Enrique Sanz	Spain		
2001	Richard Bunn	Switzerland		
2001	Arvydas Sabonis	Lithuania		
2001	René Burkhalter	Switzerland		
2001	Arnold Green	Estonia		
2001	Félix Savón	Cuba		
2001	Eric Walter			
2001	Myriam Bédard	Canada		
2001	David Douillet	France		
2001	Krisztina Egerszegi	Hungary		
2001	Cathy Freeman	Australia		
2001	Aleksandr Karelin	Russia		
2001	Marco Marin	Italy		
2001	Haile Gebrselassie	Ethiopia		
2001	Naim Süleymanoğlu	Turkey		
2001	Pirmin Zurbriggen	Switzerland		
2002	Erwin Lanc	Austria		
2002	Peter Blake	New Zealand		Posthumously awarded
2002	Shirley Strickland	Australia		
2002	Janis Grinbergas	Lithuania		
2002	Wayne Gretzky	Canada		
2002	Miroslav Šubrt	Czech Republic		
2002	Walter Bush	United States		
2002	Flor Isava-Fonseca	Venezuela		
2002	Ashwini Kumar	India		
2002	David Wallechinsky	United States		
2003	John Williams	United States		
2003	Adolf Ogi	Switzerland		
2003	Jean Durry	France		
2004	Matthias Kleinert			
2004	Francoise Zweifel			
2004	Nadia Comăneci	Romania		
2004	George Bolos		Silver	
2005	Shirley Babashoff	United States		
2006	Hans Wilhelm Gäb			
2009	Thor Nilsen			
2012	David Stern	United States		
2016	Ottavio Cinquanta	Italy		
2016	Patrick Chamunda	Zambia		
Unknown	Dawn Fraser	Australia	Silver	
Unknown	William Berge Phillips	Australia	Silver	
Unknown	Julius Patching	Australia	Silver	
Unknown	Herb Elliott	Australia	Silver	
Unknown	John Devitt	Australia	Silver	
Unknown	Stepan Kerkyasharian	Australia	Silver	
Unknown	Sandy Hollway	Australia	Silver	
Unknown	Jim Sloman	Australia	Silver	
Unknown	Michael Eyers	Australia	Silver	
Unknown	Bob Leece	Australia	Silver	
Unknown	Mick O'Brien	Australia	Silver	
Unknown	Robert Elphinston	Australia	Silver	
Unknown	Margaret McLennan	Australia	Silver	
Unknown	John Fitzgerald	Australia	Silver	
Unknown	Shirley Strickland	Australia	Silver	
Unknown	Di Henry	Australia	Silver	
Unknown	Kerry Stokes	Australia	Silver	
Unknown	Phillip Walter Coles	Australia	Silver	
Unknown	Kevan Gosper	Australia	Silver	
Unknown	Helen Brownlee	Australia	Silver	
Unknown	David Richmond	Australia	Gold	
Unknown	John Howard	Australia	Gold	
Unknown	Alexander Tikhonov	Soviet Union / Russian Federation	?	
Unknown	Alexander Karelin	Soviet Union / Russian Federation	?	
Unknown	Doug Arnot	United States	Silver	Services to London 2012
Unknown	Mike Loynd	United States	Silver	Services to London 2012
Unknown	James Bulley	United Kingdom	Silver	
Unknown	Richard George	United Kingdom	Silver	
Unknown	Debbie Jevans	United Kingdom	Silver	
Unknown	Ian Johnston	United Kingdom	Silver	
Unknown	Gerry Pennell	United Kingdom	Silver	
Unknown	Jean Tomlin	United Kingdom	Silver	

== Trivia ==
Elena Mukhina became the youngest recipient of the Olympic Order in 1982 when she was 22 years old at the time of her award. She was also the only member of the Olympic Order who never competed at the Olympics.

Carlos Arthur Nuzman and Nadia Comaneci are the two only athletes to be awarded the Olympic Order twice.

== See also ==
- Recipients of the Olympic Order
- Olympic Cup
- Olympic diploma
- Olympic Diploma of Merit
- Olympic Laurel
- Olympic medal
- Pierre de Coubertin Medal
- Paralympic Order
