= 1998 Winter Olympics closing ceremony =

- Part of 1998 Winter Olympics
- Date: 22 February 1998
- Time: 18:00 – 19:41 JST (UTC+9)
- Venue: Nagano Olympic Stadium
- Location: Nagano, Japan; 36.579722°N 138.165556°E
- Filmed by: 1998 Olympic Radio and Television Organization (ORTO '98)
- Footage: Nagano 1998 Closing Ceremony - Full Length on YouTube

The closing ceremony of the 1998 Winter Olympics took place at Nagano Olympic Stadium in Nagano, Japan, on 22 February 1998. It began at 18:00 JST and finished at approximately 19:41 JST. As mandated by the Olympic Charter, the proceedings combines the formal and ceremonial closing of this international sporting event, including farewell speeches and closing of the Games by IOC President Juan Antonio Samaranch. Followed by the extinguishing of the Olympic flame and protocol for showing the next Olympic winter games.

== Proceedings ==
=== Handover of the Olympic flag ===
First, the Greek flag was raised while its playing the national anthem. Second, the Japanese flag was raised while its playing the national anthem. Third, the Flag of the United States raised while its playing the national anthem. The Olympic flag was passed by the Mayor of Nagano City, Tasuku Tsukada, to IOC President Juan Antonio Samaranch, who then handed it over to the Mayor of Salt Lake City, Deedee Corradini. The flag was raised again in Sydney, Australia for the 2000 Summer Olympics on 15 September 2000 for the opening ceremony.

=== Contrast, culture and courage: "See you in 2002". ===
Salt Lake City, the host city of the 2002 Winter Olympic Games, presented a special performance called Contrast, Culture and Courage, featuring symbols and images that represent the American Wild West, including cowboys, stagecoaches and Utah's own Delicate Arch, based in Arches National Park. The segment concluded with the people of Utah saying to the people of Japan, and the world, "See you in 2002!" in anticipation of the first Winter Olympic Games of the 21st century as the Japanese responded back in their language with a similar phrase.

=== Official speeches and the Games declare closed ===
NAOC Vice President Goro Yoshimura delivered a farewell speech in Japanese. IOC President Juan Antonio Samaranch delivered a speech in French, and English, and congratulations to the athletes, the 7 International Olympic Winter Sports Federations, under 72 National Olympic Committee that participated in this Games. Samarach also congratulated the Nagano Committee for the Olympic Games, and the volunteers present during the Olympics. IOC President Samaranch declared closed the XVIII Olympic Winter Games. And in accordance with Olympic tradition, he called upon the youth of the world, to assemble 4 years from now in Salt Lake City, United States, to celebrate with them the XIX Olympic Winter Games, the first of the new millennium. Speaking in Japanese，"ありがとう、長野。" - "Thank you, Nagano". "さようなら、日本。" - "Goodbye, Japan".

=== Olympic Flag and Olympic Anthem ===
After a fanfare, the Olympic Flag was lowered, carried away by Japan Ground Self-Defense Force from the stadium, the Olympic Hymn was sung in Japanese by the Nagano Children's Choir.

=== Olympic Flame has been extinguished and a song ===
The Olympic flame is extinguished from the cauldron. It burn throughout the 16 day competitions. And a song Furusato sung by Anri.

== Dignitaries in attendance ==
=== Dignitaries from International organizations ===
- International Olympic Committee –
  - IOC President Juan Antonio Samaranch and María Teresa Samaranch Salisachs
  - Members of the International Olympic Committee

=== Host country dignitaries ===
- Japan –
  - NAOC Vice President Goro Yoshimura
  - Emperor Akihito
  - Empress Michiko
  - Naruhito, Crown Prince of Japan
  - Governor of Nagano City Tasuku Tsukada

=== Dignitaries from abroad ===
- United States –
  - Second Lady of the United States Tipper Gore
  - United States Ambassador to Japan Tom Foley
  - Mayor of Salt Lake City Deedee Corradini

== Anthems ==
- National Anthem of Greece - Nagano Police Band
- National Anthem of Japan - Nagano Police Band
- National Anthem of the United States - Nagano Police Band
- (International Olympic Committee) Olympic Hymn: (played by Seiji Ozawa and New Japan Philharmonic Orchestra).

== Bibliography ==
- Official Report of the XVIII Olympic Winter Games, Vol. 2. The Organizing Committee for the XVIII Olympic Winter Games, Nagano 1998. 1999. ISBN 4-7840-9826-7.
- The Closing Ceremony media guide : the XVIII Olympic Winter Games. Nagano: NAOC. 1998.
