= 1998 Winter Olympics opening ceremony =

- Part of 1998 Winter Olympics
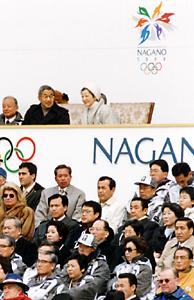
- Emperor Akihito and Empress Michiko in opening ceremony
- Date: 7 February 1998
- Time: 11:00 – 14:00 JST (UTC+9)
- Venue: Nagano Olympic Stadium
- Location: Nagano, Japan; 36.579722°N 138.165556°E
- Filmed by: 1998 Olympic Radio and Television Organization (ORTO '98)
- Footage: Nagano 1998 Opening Ceremony - Full Length on YouTube

The opening ceremony of the 1998 Winter Olympics took place at Nagano Olympic Stadium, Nagano, Japan, on 7 February 1998. It began at 11:00 JST and finished at approximately 14:00 JST. As mandated by the Olympic Charter, the proceedings combined the formal and ceremonial opening of this international sporting event, including welcoming speeches, hoisting of the flags and the parade of athletes, with an artistic spectacle to showcase the host nation's culture and history. The Games were officially opened by Emperor of Japan Akihito.

Alan Tomlinson, Professor in Leisure Studies at the University of Brighton, argued that the main theme of this opening ceremony is Peace and Harmony. While elements of Nagano's religious and sporting culture are shown throughout the ceremony, it is shown alongside examples of a hopeful wish in a world peace at the end of the 20th century.

== Officials and Guests ==
=== Dignitaries from International organizations ===
- International Olympic Committee –
  - IOC President Juan Antonio Samaranch and María Teresa Samaranch Salisachs
  - Members of the International Olympic Committee
- United Nations –
  - Secretary General Kofi Annan

=== Host country dignitaries ===
- Japan –
  - NAOC President Eishiro Saito
  - Emperor Akihito
  - Empress Michiko
  - Prime Minister Ryutaro Hashimoto

=== Dignitaries from abroad ===
- Australia -
  - Prime Minister John Howard (representing the Queen and Governor-General of Australia
  - Lord Mayor of Sydney Frank Sartor (host city of the 2000 Summer Olympics)
- Luxembourg –
  - Grand Duke Jean
- Monaco –
  - Sovereign Prince Rainier III
- Norway –
  - Crown Prince Haakon (representing the King of Norway)
- United States –
  - First Lady Hillary Rodham Clinton (representing the President of the United States
  - First Daughter Chelsea Clinton
  - Founder of International Campaign to Ban Landmines and American political activist Jody Williams
  - First Lady of Utah Jacalyn Leavitt (Host state of 2002 Winter Olympics)
  - Mayor of Salt Lake City Deedee Corradini (Host city of the 2002 Winter Olympics)
- South Korea –
  - Prime Minister Kim Jong-pil
- Belarus –
  - President Aleksander Lukashenko

== Proceedings ==
=== Bell to Symbolize Purification ===
At exactly 11am JST, a bell at Zenkō-ji temple was rung, by a man who was a teenager during World War II, and was in training to be a kamikaze pilot when the war ended. The bell that was rung was cast in 1667, and reverberates as a symbol of Nagano. It was rung to confer blessing on the opening ceremony.

=== Raising of Onbashira to Consecrate Sacred Ground ===
Onbashira — or "sacred pillars" in the Japanese — are large wooden fir posts which stand at the corners of local shrines in Nagano Prefecture. They are brought down from the surrounding mountains to purify the earth. At this ceremony, hundreds of people performed the Satobiki ceremony, where four 12 meter high onbashira are erected at the two entrances of the stadium. The logs are raised with ropes by hand, and while they are being raised, a ceremonial group of log bearers ride the logs and sing and perform other feats, while numerous men and women sustain a consistent chant. Barry Davies — the commentator for the BBC broadcast showing stated that the chants were "plaintive" being a "prelude to much hard work." Finally, each post unfurled a yellow steamer which were to call the gods that lived in the trees.

=== Dohyo-iri Ceremony ===
33 Sumo Wrestlers chosen from all over Japan entered the stadium to perform the Dohyō-iri ring purification ceremony, which while practiced in the Edo Period, it is one that can be traceable back to an 8th-century text. Then Yokozuna Akebono Tarō, eight-time Sumo Grand Champion, and 38 other wrestlers also enter the stadium, totaling the 72 wrestlers.

During this act, it was announced on the Stadium loudspeakers that the Emperor of Japan Akihito, and his wife, Empress Michiko arrive with IOC President Juan Antonio Samaranch and other dignitaries.

Then Akebono performed the Yokozuna dohyo-iri ring purification ceremony, the symbolic calling of the attention of the gods and expelling the evil spirits from the competition venue. It is more intricate than the normal dohyo-iri ceremony.

=== Children of Nagano Welcome the Athletes ===
Giant straw Dōsojin, which appear in Shinto folklore in Ōoka village arrive in the stadium. 150 primary school aged children, local participants of the "One School, One Country" initiative, arrive dressed as Yukinko (children of the snow),they are using a traditional straw winter coats and hats. After some dancing, the children take off their straw coats, showing knitted sweaters of country flags representing the 72 nations competing in these Winter Games. Each child will march with their country during the Parade of Nations, and will appear also during the lighting of the Olympic Flame.

Japanese artist Ryoko Moriyama joined the school children to perform a medley of two songs from the 1996 Andrew Lloyd Webber/Jim Steinman musical Whistle Down the Wind: the titular song and “When Children Rule the World”, sung in both Japanese and English.

=== Parade of Nations ===
2,302 athletes from 72 countries and regions participated in the competition, including 814 female athletes and 1488 male athletes. Both the number of participating delegations and the number of athletes participating in the competition were the most ever at the time.Three National Olympic Committees were sending delegations to compete in the Winter Olympics for the first time in history: Azerbaijan, North Macedonia and Uruguay. The countries were announced in Japanese, French, and English (in that order), followed by the Sumo wrestler leading them out

=== Opening Addresses ===
NAOC President Eishiro Saito delivered a speech in Japanese, welcoming everyone. IOC President Juan Antonio Samaranch delivered a speech in English, calling for athletes to "observe the Olympic truce." His Imperial Majesty the Emperor of Japan Akihito declared the games open in Japanese.

"ここに，長野における第18回オリンピック冬季競技大会の開会を宣言します。" – "I hereby declare the opening of the XVIII Olympic Winter Games in Nagano."

— His Majesty the Emperor Akihito

=== Olympic Flag and Anthems ===
After a fanfare, the Olympic Flag was carried around the stadium by eight former Japanese Olympians: Chiharu Igaya, Yukio Kasaya, Akitsugu Konno, Yoshihiro Kitazawa, Hatsue Nagakubo-Takamizawa, Yuko Otaka, Seiko Hashimoto, and Hiromi Yamamoto. During the raising of the Olympic flag, the Olympic Hymn was sung in Japanese by the Nagano Children's Choir.

The Japanese National Anthem, Kimigayo, was played by Gagaku musicians.

- Nagano City Children's Choir – Olympic Hymn
- Gagaku musicians - National Anthem of Japan

=== Torch relay and the lighting of the Olympic cauldron ===
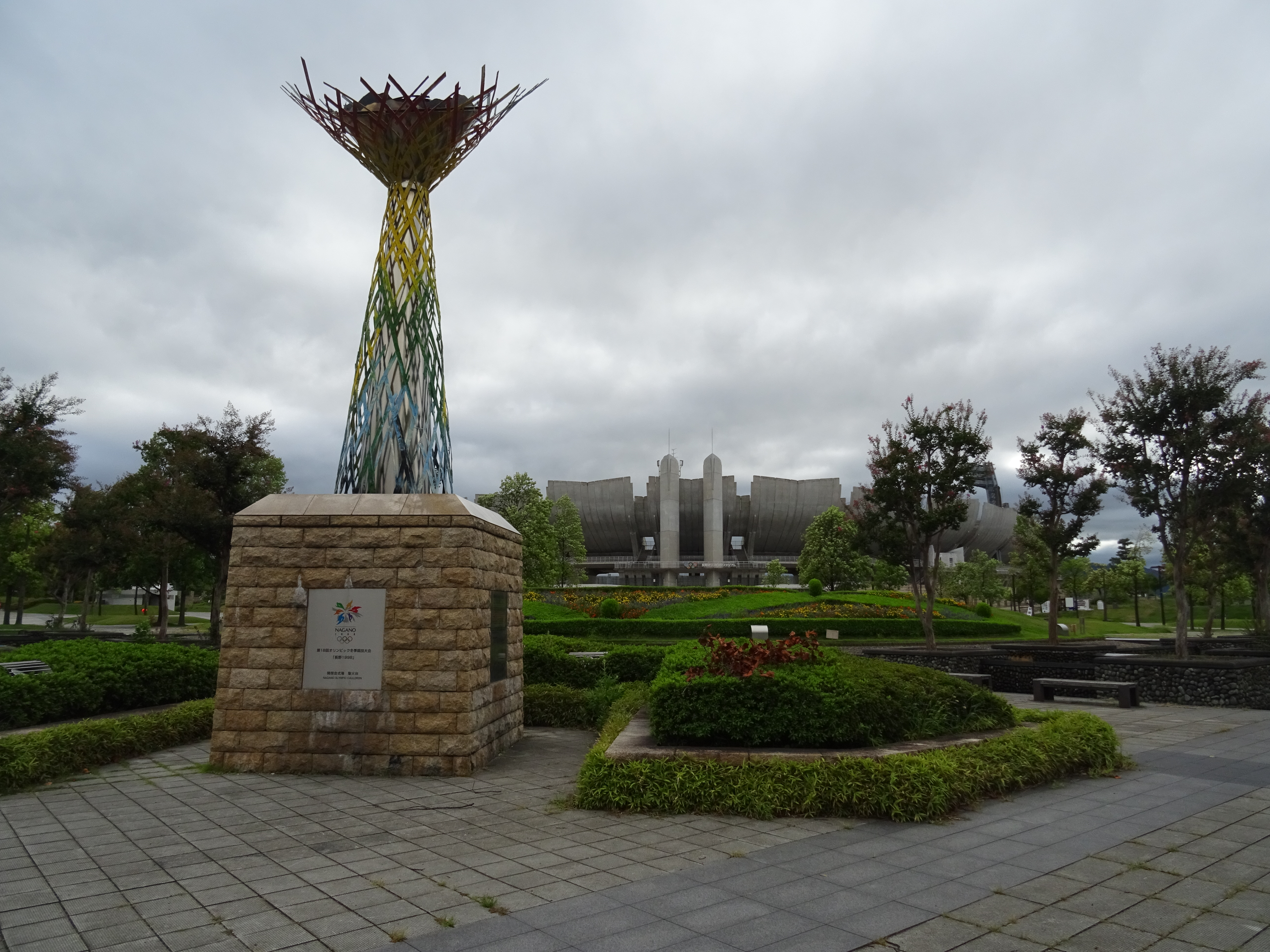
The main Olympic Cauldron now in Nagano and is used as monument

At the end of a 49-day torch relay across Japan, the Olympic flame is carried into the stadium by Chris Moon, a Landmine Survivors Network member and an activist and advocate for banning anti-personnel landmines. He is accompanied by the local Nagano children featured earlier wearing their flag sweaters. "When Children Rule the World" is reprised upon his entry into the staging area. Moon hands over the Olympic torch to Masako Chiba, bronze medalist for the Women's 10,000 metres at the 1997 World Championships in Athletics in Athens. Before doing so, Moon and the children presented the Olympic Flame to the Imperial Couple in the royal box, with the Emperor and Empress applauding Moon. Chiba passed the torch to the Japanese Team that was the current Olympic Champions on Team Event in Nordic Combined: Takanori Kono, Masashi Abe, and Reiichi Mikata, then they passed to the runner Hiromi Suzuki, winner of the Women's marathon at the 1997 World Championships in Athletics,who was representing the goddess of dawn,Amenouzume runs the upstairs using a special red kimonono while surrounded by the local Nagano children. The last torchbearer was Midori Ito, Olympic silver medalist of the Ladies' singles at the Figure skating at the 1992 Winter Olympics in Albertville, and the first Asian figure skating to win the World Championships in 1989, who lighted the cauldron. Ito was wearing a special kimono personifying the Japanese goddess Amaterasu. The music played during this sequence is Un bel dì, vedremo aria from the opera Giacomo Puccini's "Madame Butterfly".

==== Mythological Symbolism in the Lighting of the Olympic Flame ====
The final segment of the Olympic flame lighting ceremony was structuredas a visual representation of The Legend of Amano-Iwato (The Heavenly Rock Cave), one of the fundamental myths of Shintoism about the origin of dawn and the end of winter.

Marathon runner Hiromi Suzuki, the penultimate torchbearer, ascended the ramp of the flame wearing a flowing, vibrant red outfit. In the choreographic narrative, Suzuki personified the goddess Ame-no-Uzume (deity of dance and dawn), whose red costume symbolized the energy of fire and the first hues of the sky before sunrise. The athlete's dynamic ascent emulated the mystical dance performed by Uzume to evoke divine light and dispel the darkness of the Earth.

At the top of the platform, figure skater Midori Ito waited, wearing a traditional white and gold costume (Shiromuku), representing Amaterasu Ōmikami (the Sun Goddess), who was secluded in the celestial cave. The moment when Ito received the flame from Suzuki and lit the Olympic cauldron symbolized the goddess's emergence from her isolation, marking the return of the sun, the purification of the earth, and the transition from winter to spring. In Japanese cultural tradition, the chromatic juxtaposition of red (Suzuki) and white (Ito) represents the concept of Kōhaku, used as the ultimate expression of celebration and auspiciousness.

=== Olympic Oaths and Dove Balloons ===
Japanese men's Nordic combined skier Kenji Ogiwara took the oath on behalf of all 1998 Olympic athletes in Japanese, while the officials' oath was taken by figure skating referee Junko Hiramatsu in Japanese.

1,998 balloons in the shape of doves were released from the stage of the stadium.

=== The Grand Chorus ===
The finale of the opening ceremony featured a choral performance of the 4th movement of Ludwig van Beethoven's Symphony No. 9 ("Ode to Joy"), conducted by Ozawa Seiji, joined by choruses from the five satellite locations in Beijing, Berlin, Cape Town, New York City, and Sydney; The New York Times described the sequence as having been "the first time that images and sounds from around the globe were united in a simultaneous live performance."

==== Performers ====
Nagano Prefectural Culture Hall: Ozawa Seiji, Tokyo Opera Singers, Nagano Winter Orchestra. Sopranos: Izabela Labuda, Claudia Waite, Altos: Zheng Cao, Ruth Peel, Tenors: Anthony Dean Griffey, Gwyn Hughes Jones, Baritones: Denis Sedov, Kevin Short.

- Ernst Senff Choir at the Brandenburg Gate in Berlin, Germany
- Sydney Philharmonia Choirs at the Sydney Opera House, Sydney, Australia
- Boston Symphony Tanglewood Festival Chorus at the United Nations General Assembly Hall in New York City, United States
- China National Symphony Orchestra Chorus at the Shenwu Gate (Gate of Divine Prowess) of the Forbidden City in Beijing, China
- Harmony Singers, Princess Square Singers, and the Cape Town Philharmonia Choir in False Bay Cape Point, near Cape Town, South Africa

Following the performance of Ode to Joy, a flyover was done by the Japan Air Self-Defense Force performance squadron Blue Impulse, leaving smoke trails in the colors of the Olympic Rings behind them as they flew over the Olympic Stadium.

== Legacy ==
Alan Tomlinson, argues that Peace and Harmony is this opening ceremony's theme. While elements of Nagano's culture are shown throughout the ceremony, the main theme shown is how the world is more unified and harmonious at the last Winter Olympics of the 20th century. This is best seen in the massed choir that marked the beginning and the end of this ceremony, with satellite choirs at key symbolic locations of peace. It is also seen through at the flame's entrance by emphasizing the work of the International Campaign to Ban Landmines.

This is also the last Winter Olympics opening ceremony in which announcements were made in only English as well as the language of the host country of the games, and the third of five consecutive Olympics opening ceremonies in which announcements were made in just two languages. Since 2000, all announcements at the opening ceremonies have been made in French in addition to English and the language of the host country of each subsequent Olympics.

Since the 2000 Summer Olympics opening ceremony, the theme of universalism bringing peace in Olympics opening ceremonies have been dropped for more nationalistic displays, as seen in the 2002 Winter Olympics opening ceremony.

== Bibliography ==
- Official Report of the XVIII Olympic Winter Games, Vol. 2. The Organizing Committee for the XVIII Olympic Winter Games, Nagano 1998. 1999. ISBN 4-7840-9826-7.
- The Opening Ceremony media guide : the XVIII Olympic Winter Games. Nagano: NAOC. 1998.
