= Gon'ichirō Nishizawa =

Japanese politician

- 西沢 権一郎

Governor of Nagano Prefecture
- In office 26 April 1959 – 11 September 1980
- Monarch: Hirohito
- Preceded by: Torao Hayashi
- Succeeded by: Goro Yoshimura

Personal details
- Born: 5 December 1906 Ogawa, Nagano, Japan
- Died: 31 December 1980 (aged 74)
- Relatives: Makoto Kobayashi (son-in-law)
- Education: Tokyo Higher Sericulture School

Gon'ichirō Nishizawa (西沢 権一郎, Nishizawa Gon'ichirō; 5 December 1906 – 31 December 1980) was a Japanese politician and essayist. He was born in Nagano Prefecture. He was a graduate of Tokyo University of Agriculture and Technology. He was governor of Nagano Prefecture (1959–1980). He is the longest serving governor of the Nagano Prefecture.

Preceded by Torao Hayashi	Governor of Nagano; 1959–1980	Succeeded by Goro Yoshimura
