= Fatou Diouf =

Senegalese politician

Minister of Fisheries and Maritime Economy
- Incumbent
- Assumed office 5 April 2024
- Prime Minister: Bassirou Diomaye Faye
- Preceded by: Pape Sagna Mbaye

Fatou Diouf is a Senegalese jurist and politician, Minister of Fisheries and Maritime Economy of Senegal since 2024. She is also an expert and professor of maritime law at the Cheikh Anta Diop University.

== Career ==
Diouf holds a doctorate in law with a doctoral thesis on illegal fishing and worked at the Directorate of the Merchant Navy and between 1998 and 2004 at the Directorate of Fisheries Protection and Surveillace. She also worked as a legal advisor to the Ministry of Maritime Economy and the Ministry of Environment and Nature Protection between 2005 and 2012. She has also worked for UNCITRAL, the European Union, the FAO, the UEMOA and ICCAT, and is a research professor and expert in maritime and fisheries law at Cheikh Anta Diop University.

Following Bassirou Diomaye Faye's inauguration as the new president of Senegal, Diouf was appointed as the first female Minister of Fisheries and Maritime Economy on 6 April 2024, succeeding Pape Sagna Mbaye, with one of her main challenges being the comprehensive reform of fisheries policy, which involves renegotiating fisheries agreements with the European Union and the fight against illegal fishing. In May 2025, she expressed the government's commitment to supporting the transformation of artisanal fishing by guaranteeing sustainability and food sovereignty.

In February 2026 she was elected vicepresident of the West and Central African Maritime Organisation.

== Publications ==
- "Urban planning and construction disputes before the administrative court in Senegal" (2019)
- "The Law of the Sea in African Union Member States: Senegal (2017)
- "The international legal framework for combating illegal, unreported and unregulated" (2016)
- "Legal aspects of combating illegal, unreported and unregulated fishing in Senegal" (2015)
