= Tasuku Tsukada =

Japanese politician (1936–2023)

- 塚田 佐

15th Mayor of Nagano
- In office November 11, 1985 – November 10, 2001
- Preceded by: Masayuki Yanagihara
- Succeeded by: Shouichi Washizawa

Member of the Nagano Prefectural Assembly
- In office 1975–1985

Member of the Nagano City Council
- In office 1967–1975

Personal details
- Born: March 3, 1936 Nagano, Japan
- Died: February 22, 2023 (aged 86) Nagano, Japan
- Education: Waseda University

Tasuku Tsukada (塚田 佐, Tsukada Tasuku; March 3, 1936 – February 22, 2023) was a Japanese politician, and past mayor of the city of Nagano, the capital of Nagano Prefecture, in central Japan. Tsukada won his first mayoral contest in 1985. He served four full 4-year terms, until November 10, 2001. In 1997, Tsukada served as the Vice President of the Japan Association of City Mayors.

Tsukada graduated from Nagano Prefectural Nagano Senior High School (長野県長野高等学校, Nagano ken Nagano kōtō gakkō) (which was called Nagano North High School (長野北高校, Nagano kita kōkō) at the time). He then graduated from the School of Commerce at Waseda University in 1958. From 1967, he served on the Nagano City Council, and from 1975 until 1985, he served in the Nagano Prefectural Assembly. He was elected mayor in 1985 in his first candidacy. In addition, he served as chairman of the Nagano City-Hokuriku Shinkansen Liaison Council.

Tsukada retired from municipal politics in 2001. Following retirement from politics, Tsukada served as an auditor at Nagano Jidosha Center, and from 2007 an external auditor at Moriya Corporation in Nagano. Tsukada died on February 22, 2023, at the age of 86.

== 1998 Winter Olympics ==
Tsukada was mayor during the early preparation and bid process for the 1998 Winter Olympics as well as through the Games. He served as Vice President of the Nagano Olympic Organizing Committee (NAOC) from 1991 when the committee was officially established.

Following the closing ceremonies of the 1994 Winter Olympics, an International Environmental Expedition had departed Lillehammer, Norway. (Note: Hanazawa 1999b, p. 273) They traveled by dogsled, sailboat and bicycle over two and a half years. (Note: Hanazawa 1999b, p. 273) On September 25, 1996, 500 days before the games started, they arrived in Nagano where their message was delivered to Mayor Tsukada. (Note: Hanazawa 1999b, p. 273) Following the 1998 Winter Olympics, Tsukada sent a similar message to the organizers in Salt Lake City. (Note: Hanazawa 1999b, p. 273)

Tsukada organized the first Host City Mayors' Conference to discuss Olympics in the 21st Century. (Note: Hanazawa 1999b, p. 274) The mayors at the time from Sapporo (1972 Winter Olympics), Calgary (1988 Winter Olympics), Albertville (1992 Winter Olympics), Lillehammer (1994 Winter Olympics) and Salt Lake City (2002 Winter Olympics) attended, along with the mayor of Olympia (home of the Ancient Olympic Games) as observer. (Note: Hanazawa 1999b, p. 274) Following the Mayors' Conference, a declaration was released which included:

Sapporo, Calgary, and Albertville have contributed to the promotion of the Olympic Movement. During the Lillehammer Games, the "Olympic Aid" campaign was founded in order to help the children of Sarajevo. Schoolchildren in Nagano have had the opportunity to deepen their international perspective through the "One School, One Country" pro- gramme. The "Nagano Olympic Harmony Fund" supports children in underprivileged countries by providing educational materials and sports equipment. We hope that future Olympic Winter Games host cities will take their own specific actions in order to work toward the realization of peace and the support of children throughout the world. (Note: Hanazawa 1999b, p. 277)

With 200 days to go before the opening of the 1998 Games, a live celebration in Tokyo, Nagano, and Sydney, the host of the 2000 Summer Olympics, took place on NAOC's webpage, with Tsukada in Nagano and Frank Sartor, the Lord Mayor of Sydney at the time. (Note: Hanazawa 1999a, p. 114) In December 1997, Tsukada, along with Japanese Olympic Committee President Hironoshin Furuhashi, and others, headed a delegation to the Hellenic Olympic Committee. At the Temple of Hera, Tsukada and the NAOC received the flame for the start of the 1998 Winter Olympics torch relay. (Note: Hanazawa 1999b, p. 105) On February 6, 6, 1998 the Olympic flame arrived in Nagano City after a three-route relay across Japan. Kristi Yamaguchi (American sansei and gold medalist figure skater at the 1992 Winter Olympics), Masae Kasai (gold medalist in volleyball at the 1964 Summer Olympics), and Yuko Emoto (gold medalist in judo at the 1996 Summer Olympics) passed their flames to Eishiro Saito, President of NAOC, and two NAOC Vice presidents, Goro Yoshimura (the governor of Nagano Prefecture) and Tsukada, who in turn lit the flame of IOC President Juan Antonio Samaranch. (Note: Hanazawa 1999b, p. 112)

In February 1998, at the start of the 1998 Winter Olympics, Tsukada described the benefits that Olympics brought to Nagano: "We have received tangible and intangible assets... We went through various difficulties and hardships as the host city, but it has been worth it". During the early days of promoting Nagano as a possible host for the 1998 Games, Tsukada came to realize that the city of Nagano had limited name recognition. When talking with IOC members in Albertville in 1989, they asked Tsukada whether it snowed in Nagano, confusing Nagano with the city of Nagoya which had lost the bid to Seoul for the 1988 Summer Olympics.

It was Mayor Tsukuda who passed the Olympic flag to Salt Lake City Mayor Deedee Corradini at the closing ceremonies of the 1998 Winter Games. Following the 2002 Winter Olympic bid scandal that broke in late 1998, Mayor Tsukada was quoted as saying:

I'm sure you [Salt Lake City] will be able to overcome the scandal and have successful Games, too. The citizens of Salt Lake City will support the Olympic Games just like those in Nagano did... As a host city, the most important thing to do is to host successful Games. We did that. It's over, and we didn't have any problems.

Following the scandal to hit Salt Lake City, it was learned that NAOC spent approximately $14 million to woo IOC members. Tsukada said: "The burden is too much ... some moderation, some balance" must return to the Olympics.

== Mayoralty elections ==
Mayoral Candidate, October 27, 1985	Vote
Tasuku Tsukada	76,515
Jiichiro Ishida	67,148
Shuichiro Imai	28,105
Akira Takano	10,719

Mayoral Candidate, October 29, 1989	Vote
Tasuku Tsukada	103,650
Eizawa Noriko	15,406
Toshiyuki Takemura	10,601

Mayoral Candidate, October 31, 1993	Vote
Tasuku Tsukada	97,374
Toshiyuki Takemura	15,520

Mayoral Candidate, October 26, 1997	Vote
Tasuku Tsukada	97,638
Satoshi Horiuchi	19,762
Shigeo Kusama	3,681
