= Broglio =

Broglio may refer to:

== People ==
- Angelo Broglio da Lavello, known as Angelo Tartaglia (1350 or 1370–1421), Italian condottiere
- Chris de Broglio (1930–2014), Mauritian-born South African weightlifter and anti-Apartheid activist
- Ernie Broglio (1935–2019), American baseball player
- Luigi Broglio (1911–2001), Italian aerospace engineer
- Timothy Broglio (b. 1951), American prelate of the Roman Catholic Church

== Places ==
- Broglio, a village in Ticino, Switzerland
- Broglio Space Centre, Italian-owned spaceport near Malindi, Kenya

== Other ==
- Asteroid 18542 Broglio

== See also ==
- Castello di Brolio
