= ANAQ-Sup =

Senegalese state agency for higher education programs and institutions

L’Autorité Nationale d’Assurance Qualité de l’enseignement Supérieur (National Authority for Quality Assurance in Higher Education, ANAQ-Sup) is a state agency in Senegal. It serves to ensure and improve the quality of higher education programs and institutions in the country. The agency seeks to strengthen academic qualifications and ensure they are internationally recognized.

The agency is under the supervision of the Ministry of Higher Education, Research and Innovation (MESRI), part of the Cabinet of Senegal. In 2026 Massamba Diouf was the Chief Executive Officer. It was created by Decree 2012-837 in August 2012 in the wake of governance reforms undertaken in higher education. The agency was expanded by Decree 2018-1956 in November 2018 to include research and innovation.

There are three governance bodies for the agency. The Board of Directors oversees the activities of ANAQ-Sup and approves the budget. The Scientific Council defines quality standards and reviews accreditation for higher education. These individuals are appointed by the MESRI. The Executive Secretary, also appointed, implements the decisions made. They also represent the agency in international networks.

The agency is involved in several international partnerships. The African Quality Assurance Network (AfriQAN) assists with enhancing quality of higher education in all of Africa. They are a member of the Francophone African Quality Assurance Network (RAFANAQ), covering all French speaking countries of Africa. They are part of the advisory group for the African Continent Qualifications Framework (ACQF). In 2026, ANAQ-Sup met with Gambia's National Accreditation and Quality Assurance Authority. The meeting explored joint initiatives and was an opportunity to share solutions to common challenges.

Along with OBREAL, ANAQ-Sup coordinates the Erasmus+ Capacity Building for Higher Education project. The project includes Guinea, the Democratic Republic of Congo, Spain, Portugal and France. The program's goal is "to better equip these countries to develop and assess their own doctoral schools and general research quality, in line with international standards and practices."
