= Guene =

Guene may refer to:

- Guénè, Benin
- Guene language, a secret language among the slaves of West Curaçao, which may have influenced Papiamento

People with the surname Guene include:

- Charles Guené (born 1952), French politician
- Faïza Guène (born 1985), French writer and director
- Mantoulaye Guene (1939–1991), Senegalese teacher and politician

== See also ==
- Güeñes, Spain
