= René Burkhalter =

Swiss sports administrator (1934–2024)

President of the Swiss Sports Aid Foundation
- In office 2001 – 1 January 2005
- Preceded by: Paul Wyss
- Succeeded by: Ruth Metzler

President of the Swiss Olympic Association
- In office November 1996 – 1 January 2001
- Preceded by: Daniel Plattner
- Succeeded by: Walter Kägi

Personal details
- Born: 27 October 1934
- Died: 26 November 2024 (aged 90) Bern, Switzerland
- Awards: Olympic Order; 2001

René Burkhalter (27 October 1934 – 26 November 2024) was a Swiss sports administrator who was a member of the Central Committee and the Technical Commission of the Swiss Fencing Federation. He was the founder and president during 25 years of the Fencing Grand Prix of Bern, as well as the president of the Swiss Olympic Association from November 1996, succeeding Daniel Plattner, until 1 January 2001, when he was succeeded by Walter Kägi. Burkhalter also served as the president of the Swiss Sports Aid Foundation from 2001, succeeding Paul Wyss, until 1 January 2005, when he was succeeded by Ruth Metzler.

In 2001, he was awarded the Olympic Order by the IOC. Born on 27 October 1934, Burkhalter died in Bern, on 26 November 2024, at the age of 90.
