= Baaron Pittenger =

American sports administrator (1925–2021)

- Born: Baaron Brand Pittenger Jr. July 15, 1925; Kansas City, Missouri, U.S.
- Died: January 15, 2021 (aged 95)
- Education: Penn State University
- Occupation: Executive director of the United States Olympic Committee (1988–1990)
- Spouse: S. Anne Williams (m. 1946; death 2019)
- Children: Baaron Pittenger III (1961–2016)

Baaron Brand Pittenger Jr. (July 15, 1925 – January 15, 2021) was an American sports administrator who was the executive director of the United States Olympic Committee from 1988 to 1990 and USA Hockey from 1990 to 1993.

== Early life ==
Pittenger was born on July 15, 1925, in Kansas City, Missouri. His parents, Baaron Brand Pittenger and Mabel Tamm Pittenger, divorced when he was young and he lived with various relatives and family friends. He attended thirteen different schools in eight states and graduated from the Taft School in 1944. He served in the United States Navy during World War II and was a member of the United States Navy Reserve from 1946 to 1951.

== Journalism ==
Pittenger graduated from Penn State University in 1947, then worked as reporter for the Williamsport Gazette and Bulletin in Williamsport, Pennsylvania. In 1949, he joined the staff of The Hartford Times, becoming a sportswriter in 1951. That same year, he was named Connecticut's state director of Little League Baseball.

== Harvard University ==
In 1955, Pittenger became the sports information director at Brown University. Four years, later he took the same job at Harvard University. In 1970, he was promoted to associate athletic director.

== United States Olympic Committee ==
In 1977, Pittenger became the United States Olympic Committee's director of public relations and special projects. One of his first tasks was assisting the organization's move to the new United States Olympic Training Center in Colorado Springs, Colorado. In 1978, he organized the first National Sport Festival, which later became the U.S. Olympic Festival. He was promoted to assistant executive director in 1981 and served as acting executive director following George D. Miller's departure in 1987. Miller's successor, Harvey Schiller, resigned after less than three weeks on the job and the USOC chose to give the job to Pittenger. His contract was not renewed and he was replaced by Schiller in 1990. In 1992, he was awarded the Olympic Order for his contributions to the Olympic movement.

== Later career ==
From 1990 to 1993, Pittenger was executive director of USA Hockey. He succeeded Bob Johnson, who resigned to coach the Pittsburgh Penguins of the National Hockey League. From 1995 to 2000, he served as co-chairman of the USOC's anti-doping task force.

== Death ==
Pittenger died on January 15, 2021, at the age of 95. He was predeceased by his wife and son.
