= Gérard d'Aboville =

French politician and ocean rower

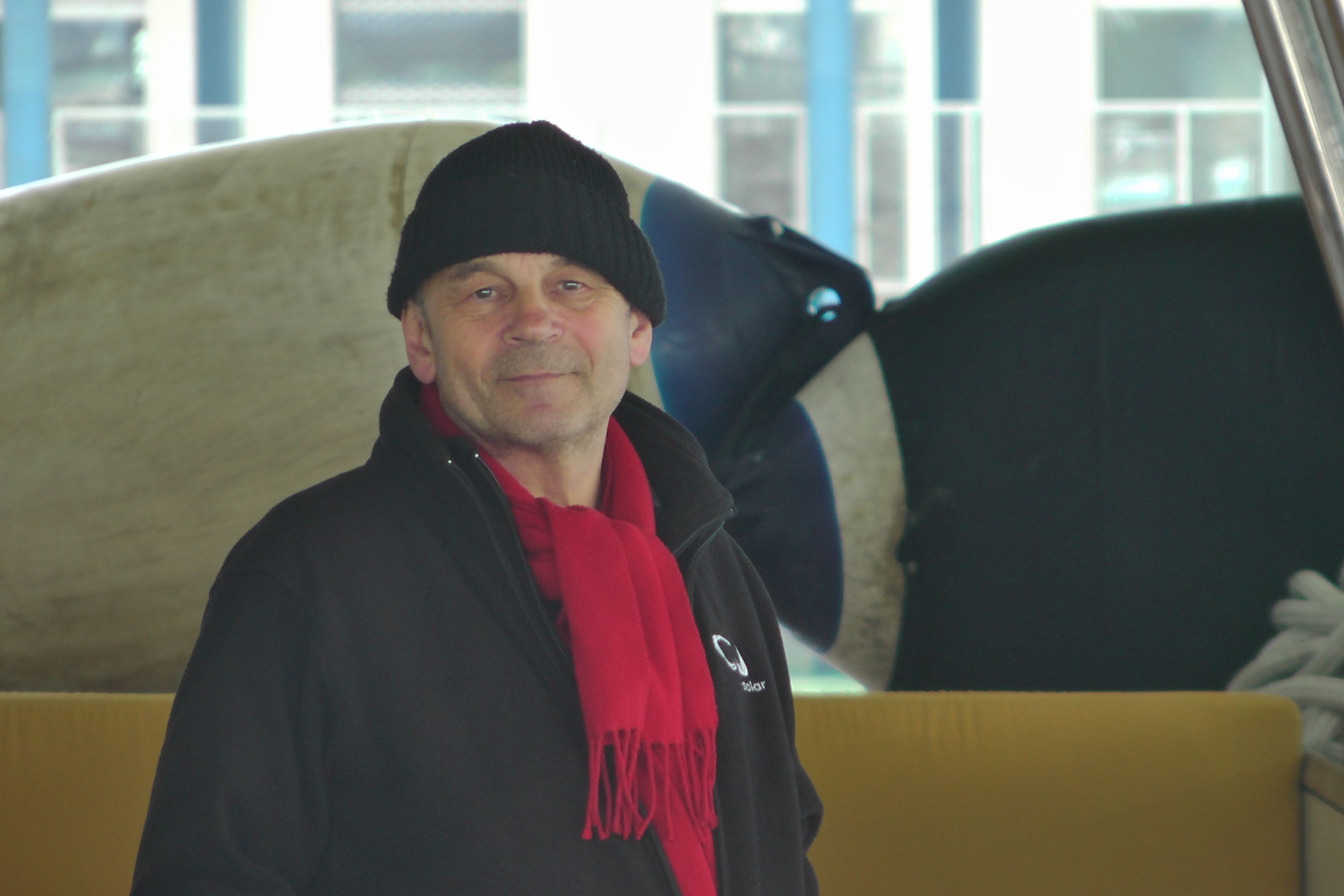
Gérard d'Aboville in 2014.

Gérard d'Aboville (born 5 September 1945 in Paris) is the first man to row across two oceans solo: the Atlantic Ocean and the Pacific Ocean. He crossed the Atlantic in 1980, travelling from Cape Cod to Brittany. D'Aboville previously built boats and organized races before undertaking this 3,500 mile trip, which he completed in 72 days. In 1981, he was a recipient of the Silver Olympic Order.

In 1991, at the age of 46 he spent 134 days crossing the Pacific Ocean, beginning in Japan and ending in Washington state. For this crossing, d'Aboville's twenty-six foot craft, nicknamed "Sector", had a pumping system to right the boat if it capsized, a sleeping place, and a canopy to protect him from inclement weather. The boat was made out of the light, sturdy composite material Kevlar, and had attached solar panels that charged the batteries of d'Aboville's radio. Items he brought included a video camera and stove. He faced forty foot waves and winds speeds reaching eighty miles per hour. In total, d'Aboville covered six thousand miles during his journey.

From 2010 to 2012 he skippered Tûranor PlanetSolar the first solar power yacht to circumnavigate the world. He now skippers the yacht, renamed Race for Water from the name of the Foundation that now operates her. and they now work to protect the seas from plastic pollution.

As a politician, d'Aboville served in Parliament from 1994 to 1999 and on the Committee on Fisheries. In 2008, he was elected a Council of Paris (UMP).

== Personal life ==
Prior to his rowing career, d'Aboville served in the military as a paratrooper.
