= London Organising Committee of the Olympic and Paralympic Games =

2012 Olympics local organising committee

- Formation: 7 October 2005
- Dissolved: 30 May 2013
- Type: Company limited by guarantee
- Headquarters: One Churchill Place, Canary Wharf
- Chairman: Sebastian Coe
- Website: london2012.com (archived)

The London Organising Committee of the Olympic and Paralympic Games (LOCOG) was the organisation responsible for overseeing the planning and development of the 2012 Summer Olympic and Paralympic Games. It was jointly established by the UK Government's Department for Culture, Media and Sport, the Mayor of London and the British Olympic Association and was structured as a private company limited by guarantee. LOCOG worked closely with the publicly funded Olympic Delivery Authority (ODA), which is responsible for the planning and construction of new venues and infrastructure.

The organising committee, which was not responsible for building permanent venues, reported spent £2.38 billion since winning the bid in 2005 and generated £2.41 billion. On 30 May 2013, it handed back to the government, Britain's Olympic committee and other beneficiaries a surplus of £30 million from the 2012 Games. The British Olympic Association received £5.3 million, the British Paralympic Association £2.6 million, and £20 million was returned to the Department for Culture, Media and Sport.

== Formation ==
On 6 July 2005, the International Olympic Committee (IOC) chose London as the host city for the 2012 Olympic Games. After the success of the London bid, LOCOG was formed to continue the work started by the bidding team. LOCOG was officially designated as the organisers of the Games at its first board meeting on 7 October 2005.

== Board members ==
The board members were:

- The Lord Coe - Chairman
- Sir Keith Mills - Deputy Chairman
- The Princess Royal
- Sir Charles Allen CBE
- Dr Muhammad Abdul Bari MBE
- Sir Philip Craven MBE
- Paul Deighton - CEO
- Jonathan Edwards CBE
- The Lord Hall of Birkenhead CBE
- Andrew Hunt
- Justin King CBE
- Stephen Lovegrove
- The Lord Moynihan
- Tim Reddish OBE
- Sir Craig Reedie CBE
- Martin Stewart
- Sir Robin Wales
- Neil Wood MBE
- Adam Pengilly
- Simon Clegg CBE (2005 - 2009)

Members of the IOC from the host country are required by IOC rules to be on the organising committee board, as well as representatives of the host Olympic association and Paralympic association.

== Senior team ==
The senior team comprised:

- Doug Arnot, Director of Games Operations, London 2012
- Jackie Brock-Doyle, Director of Communications and Public Affairs
- James Bulley, Director of Venues and Infrastructure
- Lord Coe, Chairman
- Paul Deighton, Chief Executive Officer
- Richard George, Director of Transport
- Nigel Garfitt, Director of Villages and Games Services
- Chris Holmes MBE, Director of Paralympic Integration
- Sue Hunt, Director of Strategic Programmes
- Debbie Jevans, Director of Sport
- Sir Ian Johnston, Director of Security and Resilience
- Terry Miller, General Counsel
- Danny Fisher, Legacy Development Director
- Sir Keith Mills, Deputy Chairman
- Bill Morris LVO, Director of Culture, Ceremonies and Education
- Gerry Pennell OBE, Chief Information Officer (CIO)
- Jean Tomlin, Human Resources (HR) Director
- Chris Townsend, Commercial Director
- Neil Wood, Chief Financial Officer
- Mike Loynd, Director of Readiness and C3

== See also ==
- Legacy Trust UK
