= Eiichi Kawatei =

Eiichi Kawatei (川廷 栄一, Kawatei Eiichi; December 10, 1933 – August 3, 2013) was a Japanese sports executive and sports journalist who was credited with promoting the sport of tennis in Japan and other parts of Asia. Kawatei also led the successful campaign to reintroduce as an Olympic sport in 1988. Tennis returned to the 1988 Summer Olympics a 64-year absence from the games. He also served as an Olympic Technical Delegate, overseeing all Tennis at the Summer Olympics events at each Summer Games since the sport's reintroduction the 1988 Seoul Olympics. He was asked to return as a delegate for the 2012 London Olympics, but could not attend due to declining health.

Kawatei was born in Ashiya City, Japan, on December 10, 1933.

He was an active member of the International Tennis Federation (ITF), the world governing body for tennis, for more than 30 years. He served as a member of the ITF's board of directors and Committee of Management. He also became the ITF's Vice President, Chairman of the Junior Competitions Committee, and Honorary Life Vice President. He was a member of the Japanese Olympic Committee from 1991 to 2003.

In addition to his administrative work with tennis, Kawatei also worked as a sports journalist, tennis commentator and photographer. His writings and coverage of tennis appeared in books and magazines worldwide.

In 2012, Kawatei was awarded the International Olympic Committee's (IOC) highest honor, the Olympic Order of Merit. He was also the recipient of numerous other honors, including the Golden Achievement Award in 2005 from the International Tennis Federation and the International Tennis Hall of Fame, the Golden Olympic Ring Award, and the Chinese National Sports Federation Honorable Award.

Eiichi Kawatei died on August 3, 2013, at the age of 79.
