= Helen Brownlee =

Australian Olympic Committee executive

Helen Brownlee AM
- Born: 18 May 1945 (age 80); Sydney, Australia
- Known for: First woman to be elected as one of the vice presidents of the Australian Olympic Committee Executive Board
- Honours: Medal of the Order of Australia (1985); Olympic Order (2015); Member of the Order of Australia (2018)

Helen Margaret Brownlee AM (born 18 May 1945) is an Australian executive with the Australian Olympic Committee (AOC). In 2013, she was the first woman to be elected as one of the vice presidents of the AOC executive board.

The daughter of a founding member of Australian Canoeing, Brownlee began canoeing at a young age. She specialised in canoe slalom and served as a judge at various Summer Olympic Games. In 1976, Brownlee became the first woman elected to the International Canoe Federation (ICF) Slalom and Wildwater Committee and was eventually promoted to the ICF Board of Management.

In 1985, Brownlee was awarded the Medal of the Order of Australia for her contributions to the sport of canoeing and received the Australian Sports Medal in 2000. In 2015, she was honoured with the Olympic Order for her contribution to the Olympic Games and was inducted into Sport Australia Hall of Fame. In 2018, she was made a Member of the Order of Australia for "significant service to sports administration, to women as an advocate for greater participation in sport, and to the Olympic movement".

== Career ==
Brownlee was born to father Os Brownlee, a founding member of Australian Canoeing. With his paddling experience, he helped raise and train her in competitive canoeing.

With her father's help, Brownlee trained on the Parramatta River in the K1 and K2 classes but shortly thereafter switched to canoe slalom. Brownlee won Australia’s first international slalom medal; however, because Australian Canoeing focused mostly on sprint canoeing, she was unable to compete in the 1972 Summer Olympics. As a result, Brownlee served as a judge for both the 1972 and 1988 Summer Olympic Games and later was a member of the competition jury at the 1992, 1996 and 2000 Olympic Games. In 1976, Brownlee became the first woman elected to the International Canoe Federation (ICF) Slalom and Wildwater Committee and was eventually promoted to the ICF Board of Management. In 1985, Brownlee was awarded the Order of Australia Medal for her canoeing career and contributions.

In 1992, Brownlee created the Pierre de Coubertin Awards to recognise secondary school students who are active participants in sport and demonstrate fair play and sportsmanship. After the 2000 Summer Olympics saw a rise in female slalom canoeists, Brownlee was awarded the 2002 Trophy for Oceania by the International Olympic Committee (IOC) for encouraging females to participate in Olympic canoeing.

Starting from the 1972 Olympics, Brownlee served as an official or jury member for the sport of canoeing until 2010. In 2010, Brownlee was inducted into the International Whitewater Hall of Fame.

In 2013, following referendums for gender equality, Brownlee became the first woman to be elected as one of the vice presidents on the Australian Olympic Committee. While serving as vice-president, Brownlee was inducted as a General Member of the Sport Australia Hall of Fame in 2015.

Since 2015, she has served as Chair of the Oceania National Olympic Committees Women and Sport Commission which encourages female participation in sports as well as president of the Commonwealth Canoe Federation and Oceania Canoe Association. On 5 May 2015, Brownlee was awarded the Olympic Order for her contributions to bringing international recognition to the sport of canoeing.

In 2017, both Brownlee and her father were inducted into the Paddle Australia Hall of Fame. She was later re-elected to her vice presidency position with the AOC alongside Ian Chesterman that same year.

In 2018, Brownlee was awarded the Order of Australia and was appointed to the International Olympic Committee Education Commission.
