= Inger K. Frith =

Danish sports executive and archer

Inger K. Frith OBE
- Born: Inger Kristine Pragholm; 23 January 1909; Denmark
- Died: 24 October 1981 (aged 72); Crowthorne, United Kingdom
- Office: President of the Fédération Internationale de Tir à l'Arc
- Term: 1961-1977
- Spouse: Ronald Frith
- Military career
- Allegiance: British Commonwealth
- Branch: South African Air Force; Women's Royal Air Force
- Service years: 1941-1945; 1951-1956
- Rank: Captain (SAAF); Flying officer (WAAF)
- Conflicts: Second World War
- Sports career
- Country: Great Britain
- Sport: Archery

Inger Kristine Frith (née Pragholm; 23 January 1909 – 24 October 1981) was a British archer who served as the president of world archery's governing body, the Fédération Internationale de Tir à l'Arc, from 1961 to 1977. She was the first woman to lead a major international sports federation and she is credited as being the main driver behind having archery returned to the Summer Olympics. For her services to archery she was made an Officer of the Order of the British Empire.

Born in Denmark, during the Second World War Frith served in the South African Air Force as a meteorologist, rising to the rank of Captain.

== Early life ==
Pragholm was born on 23 January 1909 in Denmark. She spent her early adult years as a travelling companion and governess; during the years she spent abroad, she became proficient in several languages.

== Second World War and military service ==
At the outbreak of the Second World War Pragholm again left Denmark, travelling through Amsterdam, Brussels, Paris, Naples and Athens. At the time of Germany's invasion of Denmark in April 1940 she was in Cairo. Pragholm remained in Egypt until early 1941 when, along with other women and children, she was evacuated to South Africa aboard the RMS Empress of Canada.

Upon her arrival in South Africa, Pragholm volunteered for military service, and on 23 October she was accepted into the South African Air Force and started training as a meteorologist. She undertook her training in a number of locations including the 61 Air School at George. Whilst at the 61 Air School she met her future husband, Dr Ronald Frith, a civilian engaged as the Royal Air Force's Senior Meteorological Officer at the school. Upon completion of her training, Pragholm insisted on being included in duties not normally undertaken by women including flying in upper-air meteorological sorties which involved lying flat in the nose of an aircraft and taking meteorological readings out of an open hatch with hand-held instruments or taking readings from instruments attached to the aircraft's wing.

After completing further training, on 27 July 1943 Pragholm was commissioned as a Second Lieutenant. As Ronald had been posted to Aden, a posting was secured for Pragholm in Cairo where she could be closer to him. As she was not naturalised she wore the Danish flag on her uniform. In late 1944 Ronald was posted back to the United Kingdom. On his return journey in November he stopped in Egypt where he and Pragholm were married in Alexandria, honeymooning in Jerusalem.

In early 1945 the now Inger Frith followed Ronald to the United Kingdom with a posting to London and then Scotland, she discharged from the services on 29 July 1945 having reached the rank of Captain. Ronald was briefly posted to France after the war ended, returning to England in 1946 to become the Senior Meteorological Officer of the Meteorological Research Flight.

After the war Frith returned to the services in a reserve capacity from February 1951 to February 1956, serving in the Women's Royal Air Force Volunteer Reserve in the Meteorological Branch as a Flying Officer.

== Archery ==
After the war Frith and Ronald spent Sunday afternoons enjoying archery recreationally, becoming proficient she became the English Southern Counties champion. In 1950 she represented Great Britain in the World Championships, finishing 14th. Prior to the 1952 World Championships Frith injured her right arm, despite this she still competed and after the first day she was placed third in a performance that was later described as heroic. She was subsequently found to have a broken bone in her arm.

Appointed the manager for the British team, a position she held for 10 years, and vice-president of the Grand National Archery Society, in 1953 Frith also became Britain’s representative to world archery's governing body, the Fédération Internationale de Tir à l'Arc. (Note: In 2011 the Fédération Internationale de Tir à l'Arc changed their name to World Archery.) In 1954 Frith organised the first Grand National Archery Society International Trial, and in 1955 she was elected vice-president of the Fédération Internationale de Tir à l'Arc, a position she held until 1961.

In 1961 Frith was elected president of the Fédération Internationale de Tir à l'Arc, becoming the first woman to lead a major international sports federation. (Note: Prior to 1961, only international sports where separate federations existed for men and women had been led by women, including hockey and cricket.) Beyond the Fédération it was not widely realised that she was a woman and a request was made for correspondence to stop referring to her as 'Mr'.

Upon being elected Frith began lobbying to have archery returned to the Summer Olympic Games, (Note: Archery had been included in the Summer Olympics in 1900, 1904, 1908 and 1920.) and in 1963 she addressed the full session of the International Olympic Committee pressing the case for the sport to be included in the 1964 Tokyo Olympics; in doing so she became the first woman invited to address that forum. On this occasion her endeavours were unsuccessful, Frith being told archery was to remain excluded out of a necessity to limit the number of sports in the program. In 1966 Frith resumed her lobbying and in April at the International Olympic Committee's meeting in Rome, Munich was selected to host the 1972 Olympics and it was announced archery was to be included at those games. Frith and her efforts are credited as being the main driver behind the decision to readmit archery to the Olympic program.

Frith remained as president of the Fédération Internationale de Tir à l'Arc for 16 years until 1977 when she stood down from the position, a record four terms in the office, upon standing down she was made the Fédération's honorary president. Her tenure as president was not without issue, in 1967 the Fédération's Vice-President Lars Ekergren (Note: Lars Ekergren had been Sweden's representative on the Fédération Internationale de Tir à l'Arc since 1949. He had served as the Fédération's general-secretary when Frith joined the Fédération, and he had been the only person to stand against Frith in 1961 when she was elected President.) resigned in protest against her, citing her leadership and her apparent support for South Africa's apartheid regime. In his memoirs the International Olympic Committee's president Lord Killanin was also critical of some of Frith's demands for the competition at the 1972 Olympics.

In addition to her services to the Fédération Internationale de Tir à l'Arc, Frith was active in encouraging youth participation in archery and the promotion of archery in schools. She had a keen interest in the history of archery and was actively involved in the setting up and display of the Manchester Museum's archery collection.

=== Honours and awards ===
For her services to archery, in 1971 Frith was made an Officer of the Order of the British Empire. In 1977 she was awarded the Silver Medal of the Olympic Order for services to international sport. For her services to the Fédération Internationale de Tir à l'Arc, in 1957 the Fédération awarded Frith their Silver Plaquette and in 1961 the Gold Plaquette.

== Later life and death ==
On 24 October 1981 Frith died in Crowthorne, England, where she and Ronald had lived together. At the time of her death, she remained the only woman to have headed a major international sports federation.
