= Mantoulaye Guene =

Senegalese teacher and politician (1939–1991)

Minister of Social Development in the Cabinet of Senegal
- In office 20 October 1987 – 5 April 1988
- President: Abdou Diouf

Personal details
- Born: 1939 Dakar, Senegal
- Died: 19 January 1991, aged 52 Dakar, Senegal
- Education: Hameth Fall College
- Alma mater: Cours Normal School

Mantoulaye Guene (1939 – 19 January 1991), also known as Mantou, was a Senegalese teacher and politician of the Senegalese Progressive Union (UPS). She was elected as a Member of the Senegalese parliament and served as Minister of Social Development in the Cabinet of Senegal (1987 to 1988).

== Biography ==
Guene was born in 1939 in Dakar, Senegal. She was educated at Hameth Fall College in Saint-Louis, then studied at the Cours Normal School in Rufisque, training to become a teacher. She worked as a teacher before entering politics.

Guene joined the Senegalese Progressive Union (UPS) on 9 June 1964 and was elected treasurer of the first national women's bureau.

Guene was elected to the National Assembly in 1983. She served as Minister of Social Developmentin the Cabinet of Senegal from 20 October 1987 to 5 April 1988. In 1988, Guene's house in Thiès was attacked during a national state of emergency.

Guene died during her term in office on 19 January 1991 in Dakar, aged 52.
