= Mool Chand Chowhan =

Mool Chand Chowhan (1927, Ajmer, Rajputana, Indian Empire - September 11, 2009) was an Indian sports official. Shri Chowhan served as the Vice President of the Indian Olympic Association (IOA), as well as serving as the head of the Table Tennis Federation of India (TTFI).

Chowhan was an active member of the 2010 Commonwealth Games Organising Committee, serving as the chairman of the Accommodation Committee.

He was a recipient of the Olympic Order from the International Olympic Committee for his contributions to Indian sports generally, and table tennis especially.

Mool Chand Chowhan died in Jaipur, India, on September 11, 2009, at the age of 82. He was cremated in his hometown of Ajmer. He was survived by his three daughters.
