= List of governments of the Republic of Senegal =

This article lists Senegalese governments since Senegal's independence from France on 4 April 1960.

== List ==
- First Sall government
- Second Sall government
- Third Sall government
- Fourth Sall government
