= Cape Town Philharmonia Choir =

South African choir based in Cape Town, South Africa

The Cape Town Philharmonia Choir is a South African choir based in Cape Town, South Africa. The choir currently consists of 150 amateur singers, directed by Richard Haigh.

== History and repertoire ==
The choir was founded in February 1967 by the late John Badminton, and is based in Cape Town. The choir incorporated a nucleus of experienced singers from its predecessor, the Melodic Choir, which had been directed by Dr Claude Brown. Since 1968, the choir has performed Handel's Messiah every year at Easter and this has become an integral Cape Town tradition. The choir's repertoire includes over 50 choral works – which includes both the serious and the popular.

The choir has also performed engagements with world-class singers and musicians such as Yehudi Menuhin, Luciano Pavarotti, John Rutter and Sir David Willcocks (who has been Honorary President of the choir since 1974). The choir participated in the 1998 Winter Olympics in Nagano, Japan by singing at Cape Point as part of a "round the world" performance of the choral movement of Beethoven's Ninth Symphony in which choirs in different continents were linked by satellite television transmission to the conductor, Seiji Ozawa, in Japan. For several years the choir collaborated with Reinhard Schwarz who often visited Cape Town as a guest conductor. Under his baton, the choir was invited to participate in the Schubert Bicentenary Festival in Vienna in May 1997, as well as performing in Munich. On his last tour to Cape Town before his death, Schwarz chose to conduct the choir in a performance of Dvořák's Requiem.

In 2001, the choir toured to England where they performed in several cathedrals and churches, and were scheduled to perform Elgar's The Dream of Gerontius in Worcester Cathedral on 2 June, the anniversary of the composer's birth.

The Philharmonia Choir has been conducted by many well-known international conductors, including Dr Donald Hunt, Nicholas Cleobury, and Sarah Tenant-Flowers, whose Harlow Chorus sang with the Philharmonia in the Easter performances of Messiah in 2005. The Norwegian conductor Kåre Hanken has also conducted the choir on several occasions. In 2009, the choir performed with the KwaZulu Natal Philharmonic Orchestra, under the baton of the American conductor William Eddins at the Cape Town City Hall accompanied by the American soprano Renée Fleming. In October 2010 the Philharmonia Choir, singing together with the Symphony Choir of Cape Town, performed Verdi's Messa da Requiem, conducted by Victor Yampolsky, and in November 2011 the choir collaborated with the New Apostolic Church Choir in a performance of Brahms' Ein deutsches Requiem, under the baton of Martin Panteleev. In 2012 the Choir performed Haydn's The Creation in the original German.

== Directors of Music ==
The directors have included Christine Reynolds, Raymond Hughes, Vetta Wise, Margaret Barlow and Antoinette Blyth, a former student of Norwegian maestro Kåre Hanken. In January 2013, Richard Haigh, an accomplished choral conductor and music educator, was appointed as the seventh Director of Music of this choir.
