= Chris de Broglio =

South African weightlifter (1930–2014)

Chris de Broglio (14 May 1930 – 12 July 2014) was a Mauritian-born South African weightlifter and anti-Apartheid activist. De Broglio, who advocated for an end to racism in sports, played a key role within the movement to expel South Africa from the Olympics in 1970, during the height of country's Apartheid era. He joined with Dennis Brutus to co-found the South African Non-Racial Olympic Committee (San-Roc). According to Nelson Mandela, the expulsion of South Africa in the 1970s revitalized the anti-Apartheid movement at the time and ultimately led to the end of Apartheid twenty years later.

De Broglio was born Marie Christian Dubruel de Broglio in Mauritius on 14 May 1930, to Maurice and Suzanne de Broglio. He took up weightlifting after a longterm, mysterious illness originally left him smaller than other kids his age. de Broglio originally moved to South Africa to study accounting.

De Broglio was a South African weightlifting champion from 1950 until 1962. He competed at the World Championships in Sweden in 1958 and Vienna, Austria, in 1961. However, he was disturbed that white and black weightlifters were forbidden from competing or training together in South Africa. During his tenure as the chairman and secretary of both the Natal and Transvaal Weightlifting Associations, de Broglio organized multi-racial weightlifting competitions, which were illegal under Apartheid.

In the early 1960s, de Broglio, who was employed by UTA, a French airline at the time, arranged for the chairman of the South African Non-Racial Olympic Committee (San-Roc), John Harris, to secretly leave South Africa. Harris testified against the Apartheid system before the International Olympic Committee (IOC), which resulted in the exclusion of South Africa from participation in the 1964 Summer Olympics. (Harris would later be executed for his role in the bombing of a white-only section of the Johannesburg Park Station). In 1963, de Broglio's organization, San-Roc, successfully lobbied for the suspension of South Africa from international football. de Broglio was placed under state surveillance and forced into exile in London, settling in Twickenham. There, de Broglio and others reestablished San-Roc in the basement of the Portman Court Hotel in Marble Arch. De Broglio organized a San-Roc boycott of the 1968 Summer Olympics in Mexico City by a number of African and Asian nations.

In 1997, de Broglio was awarded the Olympic Order for his work against racism in athletics and his defense of the Olympic Charter.

De Broglio lived in Corsica during his later life. He frequented the gym until he was 80 years old. He died on July 12, 2014, at the age of 84. His first wife, June Von Solms, whom he married in 1954 and with whom he had six children, died in 1982. He was survived by his children and his second wife, Renee de Broglio, whom he married in 1988.
