= Raoul Mollet =

Belgian modern pentathlete

Personal information
- Born: 28 November 1912 Hainaut, Belgium
- Died: 14 August 2002 (aged 89) Ixelles, Belgium

Sport
- Sport: Modern pentathlon

Raoul, Knight Mollet (28 November 1912 – 14 August 2002) was a Belgian modern pentathlete. He competed at the 1936 and 1948 Summer Olympics.
