= Nagano Olympic Organizing Committee =

The Nagano Organizing Committee for the Olympic Winter Games of 1998 (NAOC) was the organizing committee for the 1998 Winter Olympics in the city of Nagano, Japan. The committee was established shortly after Nagano was selected as the host city in June 1991. Beginning in August, an advisory committee with members from the Japanese Ministry of Education, Culture, Sports, Science and Technology, the JOC, the Nagano prefectural government, and the Nagano municipal government was established. The committee received non-profit foundation status from the Japanese Ministry of Education, Culture, Sports, Science and Technology, and initial funding of 100 million yen that was split 60-40 between the JOC and the Nagano City government.

During the run-up to the Games, various NAOC sections and departments were responsible for particular areas of planning for the Winter Olympics. (Note: Hanazawa 1999b, p. 145) However, for the actual Games, each venue had NAOC staff who were responsible for running of the events at each particular venue, working in coordination with the central headquarters. (Note: Hanazawa 1999b, p. 145)

In all, NAOC organized a total of 44,096 staff, including direct NAOC staff, host site government employees, volunteers, officials for the various competitions, Olympic Radio and Television Organization (ORTO'98) staff, and SDF personnel. (Note: Hanazawa 1999b, p. 145)

== Members included ==
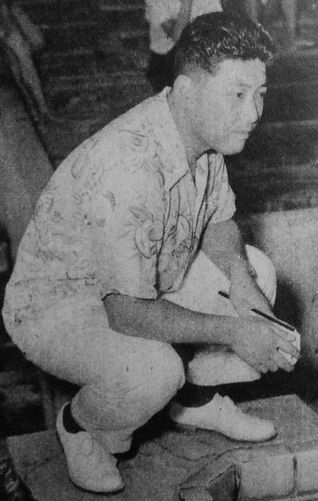
Hironoshin Furuhashi, past president of the JOC

- Eishiro Saito (President): Saito, the President of the Sports Fund Foundation, was a former president of Nippon Steel and the 6th Chairman of the Japan Business Federation (Keidanren).
- Goro Yoshimura (Vice President), Governor of Nagano Prefecture
- Hironoshin Furuhashi (Vice President), President of the JOC, was a former competitive swimmer who had set 33 world records during his swimming career.
- Yoshiaki Tsutsumi (Vice President): Tsutsumi, the President of the Ski Association of Japan, was the major shareholder in the Seibu Corporation, and from 1987-1994 was listed by Forbes magazine as the wealthiest individual in the world.
- Tasuku Tsukada (Vice President), Mayor of Nagano City
- Makoto Kobayashi (Director General), (Director General) of the Organizing committee, was a former Vice Minister of the Ministry of Home Affairs.

On November 27, 1991, the executive board was convened for the first time.

== See also ==
- Bids for the 1998 Winter Olympics
