= Goro Yoshimura =

Japanese politician (born 1926)

- 吉村 午良

Governor of Nagano Prefecture
- In office 26 October 1980 – 25 October 2000
- Monarchs: Hirohito; Akihito
- Preceded by: Gon'ichirō Nishizawa
- Succeeded by: Yasuo Tanaka

Personal details
- Born: 13 February 1926 Nagaoka, Niigata, Japan
- Died: 7 May 2007 (aged 81) Nagano City, Nagano, Japan
- Education: University of Tokyo

Goro Yoshimura (吉村 午良, Yoshimura Gorou; 13 February 1926 – 7 May 2007) was a Japanese politician, and governor of Nagano Prefecture, in central Japan. Yoshimura was a graduate of the law faculty at the University of Tokyo. Upon graduation, he worked in the Nagano Prefectural Government Office. In 1971, he became deputy governor, and was elevated to governor in 1980 when the governor at the time, Gon'ichirō Nishizawa, suffered a cerebral hemorrhage. Yoshimura served five full 4-year terms, until 26 October 2000. Yoshimura retired from politics in 2000.

Yoshimura served as one of the four Vice Presidents of the Nagano Olympic Organizing Committee from 1991 and the Nagano Paralympic Organizing Committee President, when the committees was founded, until its final meetings in February 1999. On 15 June 1991, at the 97th IOC session in Birmingham, United Kingdom, Yoshimura was part of the Nagano Olympic Bid committee, where he spoke followed by Hironoshin Furuhashi, president of the Japanese Olympic Committee. In 1998, Yoshimura received the Silver Badge of the Olympic Order.

== Gubernatorial elections ==
Gubernatorial Candidate, 26 October 1980	Vote
Goro Yoshimura	586,304
Yoneo Mizuguchi	367,450

Gubernatorial Candidate, 21 October 1984	Vote
Goro Yoshimura	772,850
Fumio Matsumura	151,843

Gubernatorial Candidate, 16 October 1988	Vote
Goro Yoshimura	799,050
Fumio Matsumura	180,890

Gubernatorial Candidate, 18 October 1992	Vote
Goro Yoshimura	736,038
Natsuo Kataoka	132,749

Gubernatorial Candidate, 20 October 1996	Vote
Goro Yoshimura	905,272
Tomoki Nakako Kataoka	219,842
Shigeo Kusuma	42,378

Preceded by Gon'ichirō Nishizawa	Governor of Nagano; 1980-2000	Succeeded by Yasuo Tanaka
