= James Bulley =

British businessman and Chartered Surveyor

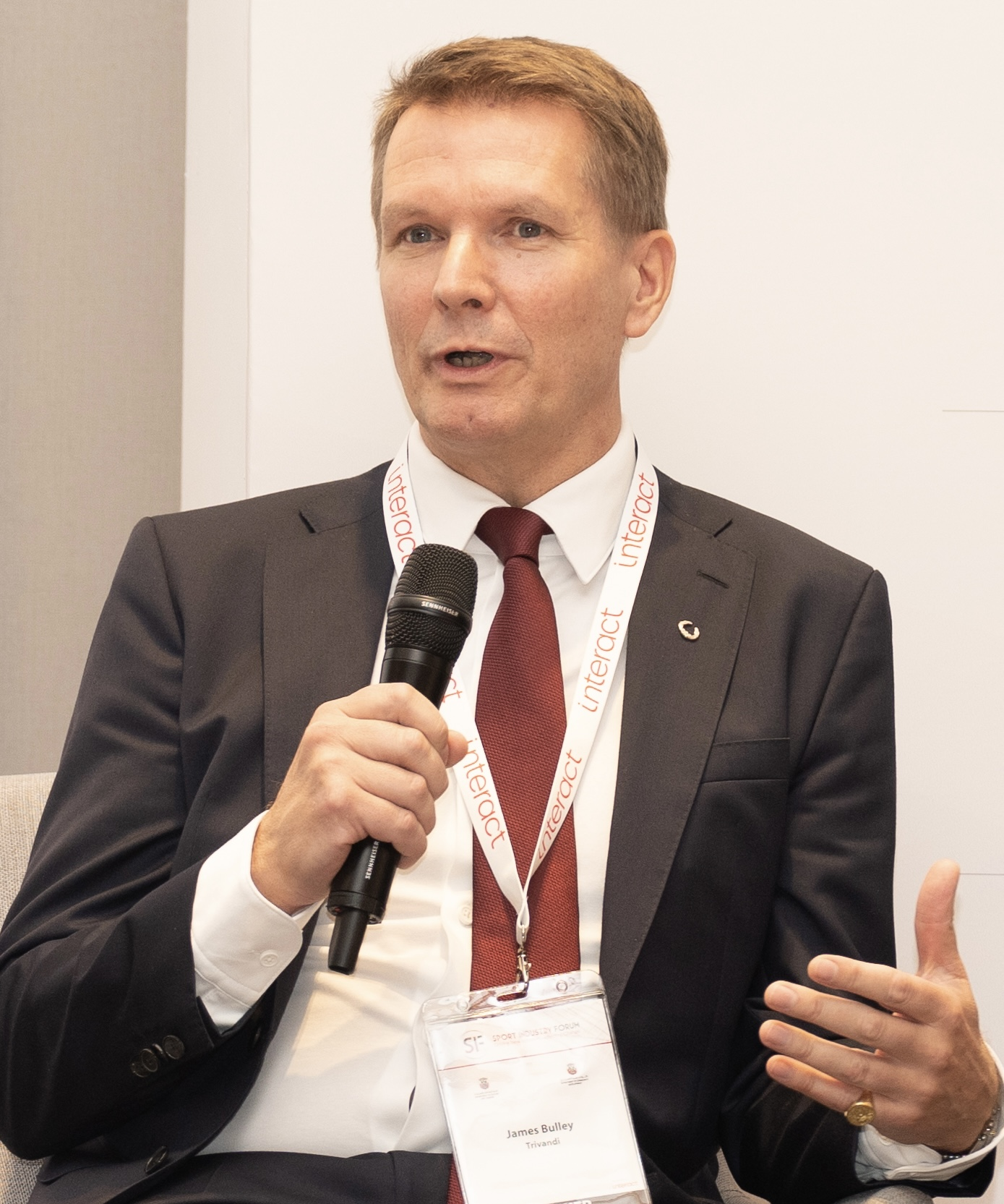
- James Bulley speaks at the Sports Industry Forum in Abu Dhabi, November 2022
- Occupation: businessman

James Bulley OBE FRICS is a British businessman and Chartered Surveyor. He is best known for being director of venues and infrastructure for the London Organising Committee of the Olympic Games and Paralympic Games (LOCOG), the organisation responsible for planning and delivering the 2012 Summer Olympics and Paralympics.

== Early life ==
Bulley was made a Captain in the London Guards regiment of the British Army in 1997. He was granted Fellowship of the Royal Institution of Chartered Surveyors in 2017.

== Career ==
Bulley worked at Drivers Jonas property consultants, from 1991 to 1993 and from 1995 to 2008.

He was seconded to the London 2012 bid Team in October 2003 as director of venues and infrastructure,

Following the awarding of the Games to London on 6 July 2005, Bulley continued as director of venues and infrastructure of the London Organising Committee of the Olympic and Paralympic Games (LOCOG), as a member of the Senior Team.

Bulley co-founded Trivandi in 2013. Since 2013, Trivandi has grown globally with offices in London, Dubai and Riyadh and delivered multiple mega projects including the Olympic Games, FIFA World Cup and World Expos.

He was appointed as CEO of the executive committee of the 2017 Asian Indoor and Martial Arts Games in Ashgabat, Turkmenistan.

Bulley was specialist adviser for the restoration and renewal of the Palace of Westminster. and the Events Research Programme. He has also been chairman of solar energy company, Solivus Ltd, since January 2000.

== Publications ==
Bulley has been published in Henry Stewart Publications, December 2002: “Stadia development as a catalyst for regeneration” and Proceedings paper for the ICE journal, May 2015: “London 2012 legacy: a sustainable model for delivering large sports events”. Bulley is a "Thought Leader" for the journal Event Management.

== Honours ==
Bulley was made an officer of the Order of the British Empire in The Queen's 2013 New Year Honours for services to the Olympic and Paralympic Games in London. James was awarded a Silver Olympic Order in 2012 for services to the London 2012 Games.

== Personal life ==
Bulley has competed for Great Britain at Age Group in the World Triathlon Championship Series Grand Finals in 2011 and 2013.
