= Cabinet of Senegal =

Advisory body to President of Senegal

The Council of Ministers, also known as the Cabinet, is the cabinet of ministers of the Republic of Senegal and is part of the executive branch of the Government of Senegal. The cabinet serves as an advisory body to the President of Senegal, who serves as its chairman. Members of the cabinet are appointed by and report to the President on the advice of the Prime Minister of Senegal, who can dismiss them at will. The cabinet currently consists of 35 government ministries, each responsible for some aspect of providing government services.

== Ministries ==
| Portfolio / Ministry | Minister |
|---|---|
| Armed Forces | Yankoba Dieme |
| Economy, Finance and Planning | Cheikh Diba |
| Interior and Public Security | Mouhamadou Makhtar Cisse |
| African Integration, Foreign Affairs and Senegalese Abroad | Cheikh Niang |
| Justice, Keeper of the Seals | Moussa Sarr |
| Family, Social Action and Solidarity | Marie Angélique Mame Selbé Diouf |
| Higher Education, Research and Innovation | Boubacar Camara |
| Energy and Petroleum | El Hadji Abdourahmane Diouf |
| Industry and Trade | Serigne Guèye Diop |
| Water and Sanitation | Cheikh Tidiane Dieye |
| National Education | Moustapha Mamba Guirassy |
| Health and Public Hygiene | Ibrahima Sy |
| Urban Planning, Local Authorities and Regional Development | Moussa Bala Fofana |
| Infrastructure | Déthié Fall |
| Communication and Relations with Institutions | Bacary Sarr |
| Microfinance and Social and Solidarity Economy | Alioune Dione |
| Agriculture, Food Sovereignty and Livestock | Cheikhou Oumar Ba |
| Telecommunications and Digital Affairs | Samba Diouf |
| Public Service, Labour and Public Service Reform | Mamadou Lamine Diante |
| Youth and Sports | Djirèye Clotilde Coly |
| Culture, Crafts and Tourism | Alpha Thiam |
| Employment and Vocational and Technical Training | Idrissa Samb |
| Mines and Geology | Cheikhou Oumar Seck |
| Environment and Ecological Transition | Aliou Gori Diouf |
| Land and Air Transport | Abdoul Ahad Ndiaye |
| Fisheries and Maritime Economy | Amy Mara |
| Budget | Bassirou Sarr |
| Economy, Planning and Cooperation | Allé Nar Diop |
| Livestock | Ousmane Diagne |
| Culture, Creative Industries and Historical Heritage | Mame Coumba Diop |

== See also ==
- Politics of Senegal
- List of governments of the Republic of Senegal
