= Djirèye Clotilde Coly =

Senegalese politician

Djirèye Clotilde Coly is a Senegalese accountant, finance professional, and politician who has served as the Minister of Youth and Sports of Senegal since June 2026.

== Early life and education ==
Coly attended the Institution Notre-Dame from 1998 to 2000. She obtained a Master's degree in Accounting and Financial Sciences (MSTCF) from the University of Montesquieu Bordeaux IV in France between 2000 and 2005. She subsequently earned a Master's degree in Accounting and Auditing from the Institut d'Administration des Entreprises (IAE) of Pau in 2006.

Between 2006 and 2013, she completed the Certified Public Accountant (CPA) diploma through the Academy of Paris. In 2016, she obtained a Six Sigma Black Belt certification from the Aveta Business Institute.

== Career ==
Coly is a chartered accountant registered with the National Order of Chartered Accountants and Approved Accountants of Senegal (ONECCA). She has worked in accounting, auditing, consulting, and financial management for more than nineteen years. She became a partner at Deloitte Senegal within the Business Process Solutions division in October 2022.

In October 2025, she was appointed Director of Employment at the Ministry of Employment and Technical and Vocational Training succeeding Babacar Sy, serving until January 2026.

On 1 June 2026, Coly was appointed Minister of Youth and Sports in the government of Prime Minister Ahmadou Alhaminou Mohamed Lô, succeeding Khady Diène Gaye.

As minister, she has been responsible for overseeing preparations for Senegal's participation in the 2026 FIFA World Cup and the organization of the 2026 Summer Youth Olympic Games in Dakar.
