= Makoto Kobayashi (Olympics) =

Japanese politician and Olympic organizer

Makoto Kobayashi (小林 實, Kobayashi Makoto), a former vice minister of the Japanese Ministry of Home Affairs, served as the general director of the Nagano Olympic Organizing Committee (NAOC) for the 1998 Winter Olympics which were held in Nagano, Japan.

Beginning in April 1996, Kobayashi held monthly press conferences to update the public on progress towards the games. (Note: Hanazawa 1999a, p. 106) During the 107th IOC Session on February 2, 1998, Kobayashi acted as master of ceremonies. (Note: Hanazawa 1999a, p. 156)

In the lead-up to the 1998 games, among other duties, Kobayashi represented the NAOC on the Olympic Technology Working Group, which met to resolve contract issues between the NAOC and IBM. (Note: Hanazawa 1999a, p. 204) In his role as director general of the games, Kobayashi also served as chief of operations. (Note: Hanazawa 1999b, p. 145)

== Bibliography ==
- Hanazawa, Nahomi (1999a). The Shinano Mainichi Shimbun (ed.). Official Report of the 1998 Winter Olympic Games, Vol. 1: Planning and Support (PDF). Translated by Norman Kong. Nagano (Japan): NAOC. ISBN 4784098259.
- Hanazawa, Nahomi (1999b). The Shinano Mainichi Shimbun (ed.). Official Report of the 1998 Winter Olympic Games, Vol. 2: Sixteen Days of Glory (PDF). Translated by Norman Kong. Nagano (Japan): NAOC. ISBN 4784098267.
