= Eishiro Saito =

Eishiro Saito (斎藤 英四郎, Saitou Eishiro) (November 11, 1911 - April 22, 2002) was a Japanese businessman, the former President of Nippon Steel, the 6th Chairman of the Japan Business Federation (Keidanren) from 1986 to 1991, President of the Japan Science Foundation from 1988, President of the Japan Sports Fund, and President of the Nagano Olympic Organizing Committee.

== Biography ==
Saito was born in Yasuda-machi, Kitakanbara District, Niigata, present day Agano city. In 1941, Saito joined Nippon Steel. In 1968, he became their Senior Managing Director and in 1973 he became Executive Vice President. In 1981, he became chairman and CEO of Nippon Steel. In 1987, he retired as chairman, and became Honorary Chairman. Saito died of heart failure at the age of 90. Saito was survived by two children, a daughter and son.

== Public affairs ==
In 1986, when the 5th Chairman of Keidanren, Yoshihiro Inayama, retired, Saito was chosen with unanimous consent. Previous to being chosen as Chairman, Saito was one of 10 Vice Chairmen, and it was practice to select a chairmen from among the vice chairmen. As Chairman of Keidanren, Saito encouraged talks at the corporate-level between Japanese companies and major trading partner companies, and at Japan-US discussions between 1989 and 1990, Saito represented Japanese businesses.

During US-Japan business talks in 1987, Saito warned Japanese business to consider "social responsibility" and "international commitment", and suggested that Japanese business could relinquish some market share. Saito also urged the Japanese government to set up a fund to distribute government guaranteed loans for developing nations to "expand the social infrastructure of the world". Saito had been credited with helping soften tensions that existed in the 1980s between Japan and its various trading partners.

During the October 1978 visit of Deng Xiaoping to Japan, Deng visited the Nippon Steel pant near Tokyo. Deng asked if a similar plant could be built in China. Saito, at that time the company president, replied that something better could be built. In 1986, the Japanese government established the Australian National 200 Year Forum, with Saito as Chairman, to support the Australian Bicentenary. With Saito's recommendation, the Japanese government supported half the cost, one billion yen, of building Questacon, the Australian National Science and Technology Centre.

== 1998 Winter Olympics ==
The Nagano Olympic Organizing Committee (NAOC) was formally established in June 1991 with Saito as president.

In December 1997, with Japanese figure skater Midori Ito, Saito brought the Olympic Torch as part of the 1998 Winter Olympics torch relay to Ryutaro Hashimoto, at the time the Prime Minister of Japan.

At the 1998 Winter Olympics opening ceremony, Saito was quoted as saying "I sincerely hope that these games from the heart will achieve such splendid heights that they will ... be talked of for generations to come."

== Awards ==
- Japanese Blue Ribbon Medal of Honor, in 1967 (藍綬褒章)
- Order of the Sacred Treasure 1st class, Grand Cordon, in 1982
- Order of the Rising Sun, 1st class, Grand Cordon, in 1990

== See also ==
- Bids for the 1998 Winter Olympics

Preceded by (Norway) Gerhard Heiberg	President of Organizing Committee for Winter Olympic Games; 1998	Succeeded by (United States) Frank Joklik
