= Nagano Olympic Stadium =

Baseball venue in Japan

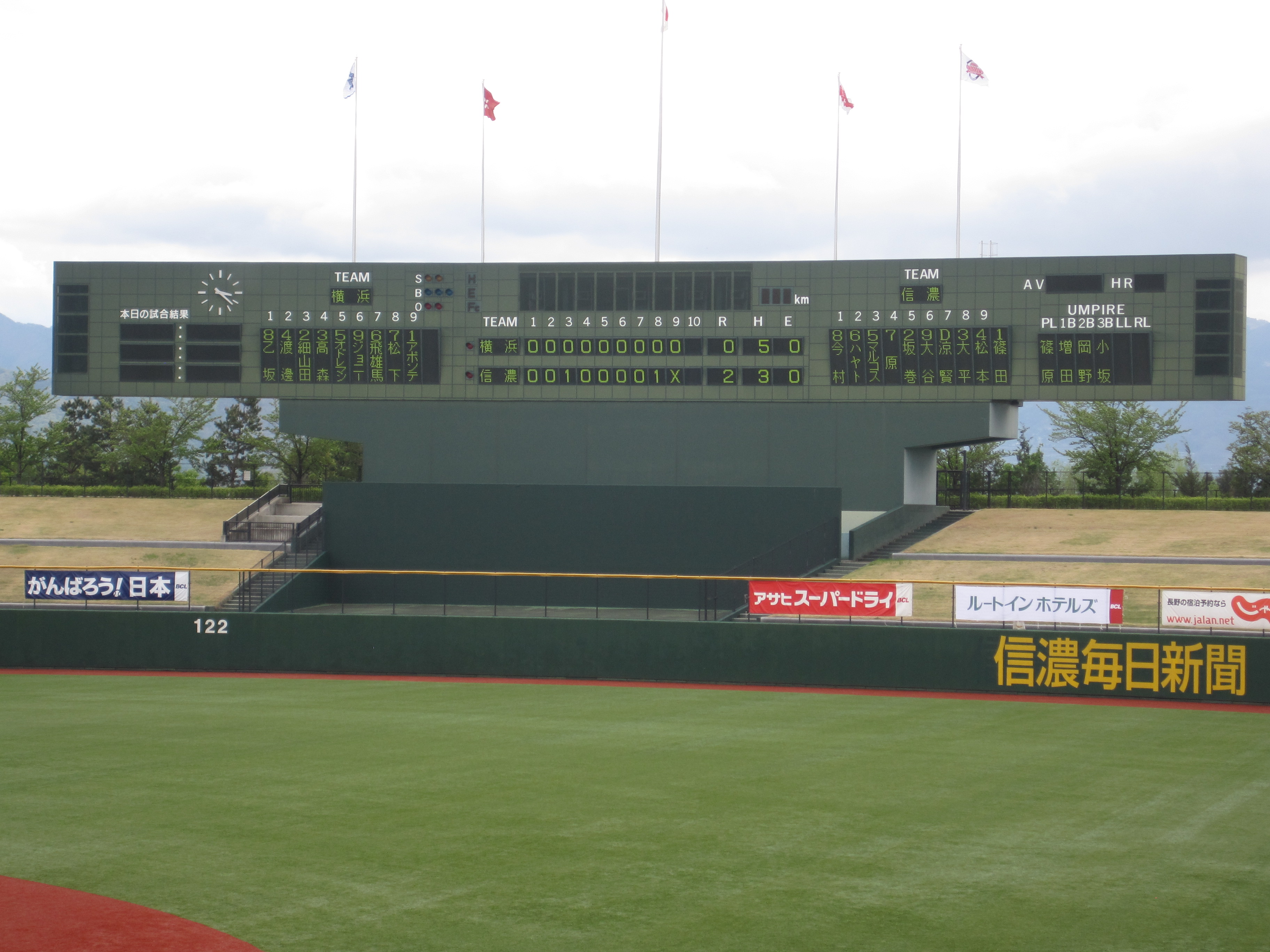

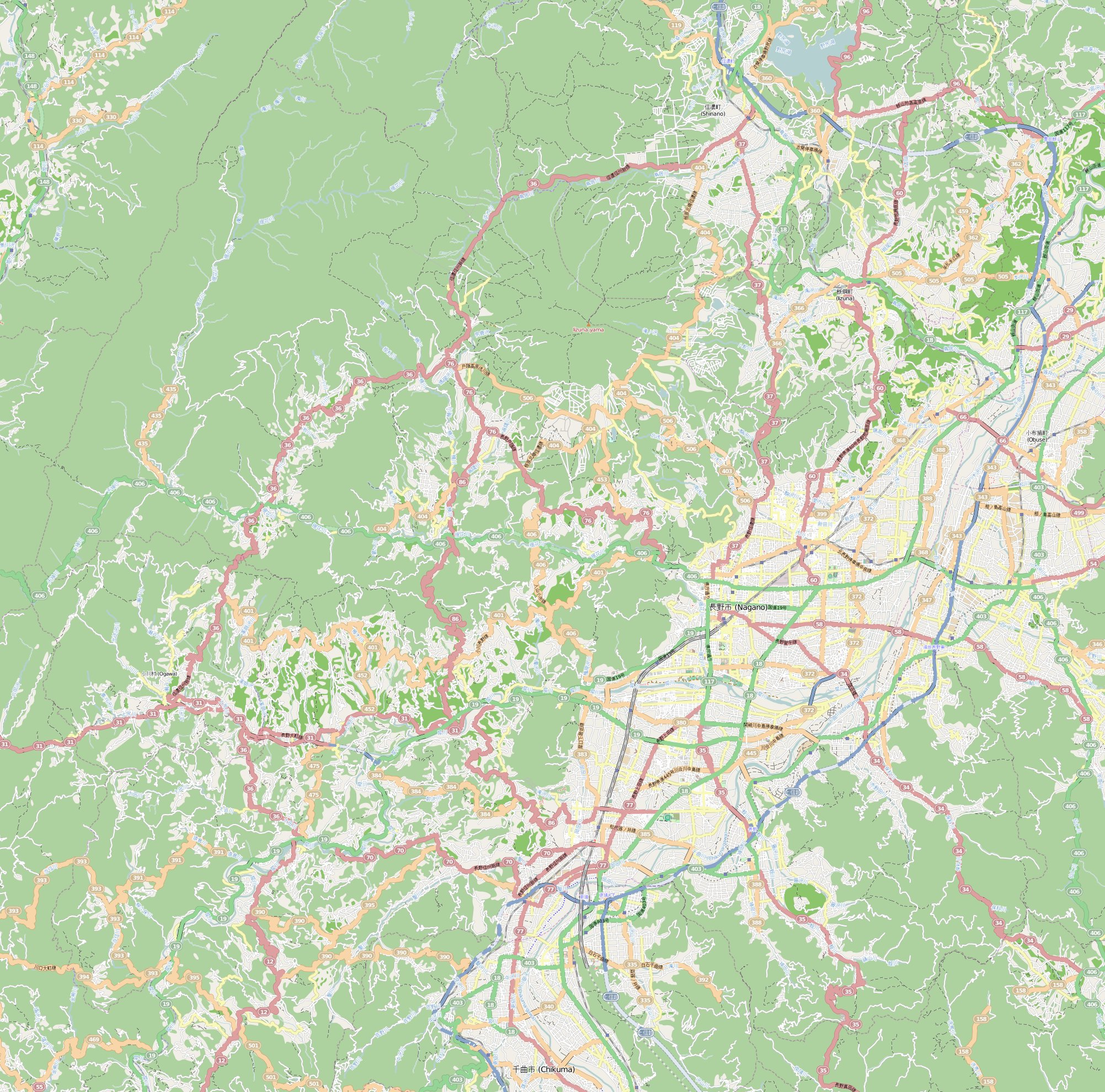
- Location within Nagano, Nagano Location within Nagano Prefecture Location within Japan
- Location: Nagano, Nagano, Japan
- Coordinates: 36.579722°N 138.165556°E
- Owner: City of Nagano
- Capacity: 35,000
- Surface: Artificial turf
- Field size: Left Field – 99.1 m (325 ft); Center Field – 122 m (400 ft); Right Field – 99.1 m (325 ft); Height of Outfield Fence – 4 m (13 ft)

Construction
- Opened: 1998

Tenant
- Shinano Grandserows (BCL) (2007–present)

Nagano Olympic Stadium (長野オリンピックスタジアム, Nagano Orinpikku Sutajiamu) is a baseball stadium in Nagano, Nagano, Japan. It was used for the opening and closing ceremonies for the 1998 Winter Olympics. The stadium holds 35,000 people.

The stadium is the finishing point for the annual Nagano Olympic Commemorative Marathon.
