= Hironoshin Furuhashi =

Japanese swimmer (1928–2009)

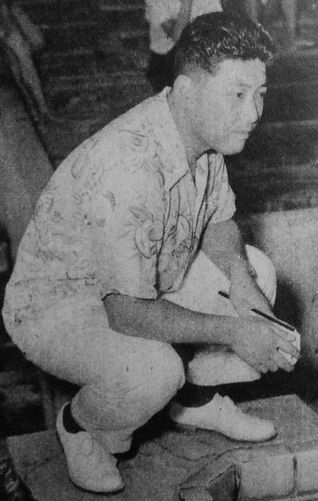

Personal information
- Full name: Hironoshin Furuhashi
- Nickname: Flying fish of Fujiyama
- Nationality: Japanese
- Born: September 16, 1928 Yūtō, Shizuoka, Japan
- Died: August 2, 2009 (aged 80) Rome, Italy

Sport
- Sport: Swimming
- Strokes: Freestyle

Hironoshin Furuhashi (古橋 廣之進, Furuhashi Hironoshin; 16 September 1928 – 2 August 2009) was a Japanese Olympic freestyle swimmer. In 1948, he set world records in the 400 and 1,500 meter freestyles at the Japan national championships. Furuhashi and Japan were not allowed to compete at the 1948 Summer Olympics because of Japan's role in World War II.

Because of his achievement at the 1949 U.S. National Championships of Aquatics, in which he set new world records of freestyle swimming in all distance categories, Furuhashi was referred to by the US media as "the flying fish of Fujiyama".

Furuhashi competed in the 1952 Summer Olympics, but did not perform well because of the lingering effects of dysentery which he had contracted during a swimming tour of South America in 1950. In total, Furuhashi set 33 world records during his swimming career. After retiring from competitive swimming, he served as president of the Japanese Olympic Committee for five terms until retiring in 1999.

On August 2, 2009, he was found dead in his sleep at his hotel room in Rome, where he was staying for the 2009 World Aquatics Championships.

== World records ==
=== Official ===
1949 U.S. Championships

- 400m freestyle 4:33.3
- 800m freestyle 9:33.5
- 1500m freestyle 18:19.0

=== Unofficial ===
1947 Japan Championships

- 400m freestyle 4:38.4

== Honours ==
- Vice President - FINA
- Honorary Chairman - Japan Swimming Federation
- Honorary advisor - Olympians Association of Japan
- Junior third rank (2009; posthumous)
- Order of Culture (2008)
- Order of the Rising Sun, 2nd class (2003)
- Chairman - Japanese Olympic Committee (1990–99)
- Vice President of Organizing Committee - 1998 Winter Olympics
- Vice President of Organizing Committee - 1995 Summer Universiade
- Chairman of Organizing Committee - 1994 Asian Games
- Person of Cultural Merit (1993)
- Secretary General - 1985 Summer Universiade
- Shiju Hosho Order (1983)
- International Swimming Hall of Fame (1967)

== See also ==
- List of members of the International Swimming Hall of Fame
- World record progression 400 metres freestyle
- World record progression 800 metres freestyle
- World record progression 1500 metres freestyle
