= Fernando Alvarez =

Fernando Alvarez may refer to:

== Arts and entertainment ==
- Fernando Álvarez de Sotomayor y Zaragoza (1875–1960), Galician painter
- Fernando Luis Alvarez, American gallerist and art activist

== Politicians ==
- Fernando Álvarez de Toledo, 3rd Duke of Alba (1507–1582), Spanish noble, officer and diplomat
- Fernando Álvarez Monje (born 1968), Mexican politician
- Fernando Alvarez (economist) (born 1964), Argentine macroeconomist

== Sportspeople ==
- Fernando Álvarez (footballer, born 1925) (1925–2013), Filipino footballer, football manager and referee
- Fernando Álvarez (footballer, born 2003)
- Fernando Alvarez (jockey) (1937–1999), American Thoroughbred horse racing jockey and trainer
- Fernando Álvarez (sailor) (born 1973), Spanish Paralympic sailor
