= Carolina López (sailor) =

Spanish adaptive sailor

Carolina López Rodríguez
Personal information
- Nationality: Spanish

Sport
- Country: Spain
- Sport: Sailing

Carolina López Rodríguez is a Spanish adaptive sailor who has represented Spain at the 2012 Summer Paralympics where she came away with a Paralympic diploma.

== Personal ==
López is a tetraplegic as a result of an accident and only has functionality from the chest up. In March 2011, she was part of a delegation who went to the Zarzuela Palace and were received by Felipe de Marichalar y Borbón and Letizia, Princess of Asturias. It was part of a wider program aimed at integration of people with disabilities in Spanish society through sports. In 2012, she was a 36-year graduate student in business.

== Sailing ==
Following her accident, López met people associated with Fundación También who encouraged her to try a number of sports including cycling, skiing and sailing. Fernando Alvarez Ortiz de Urbina was the one who encouraged her to take up the sport of sailing more seriously. The pair were not confident they would qualify for London but decided to take part in qualifying tests anyway and were pleasantly surprised to qualify for the Games.

López left for London from Madrid in late August. She competed in the Mixed Two Person SKUD18 event at the 2012 Summer Paralympics, where she did not medal. In two sessions, the pair finished in seventh place. The pair earned a Paralympic diploma. It was the best performance ever by Spanish sailors. In December 2012, they were recognised for their elite sportsmanship by the Union of Sports Federations Madrid.
