= List of awards and honours received by Muhammad Yunus =

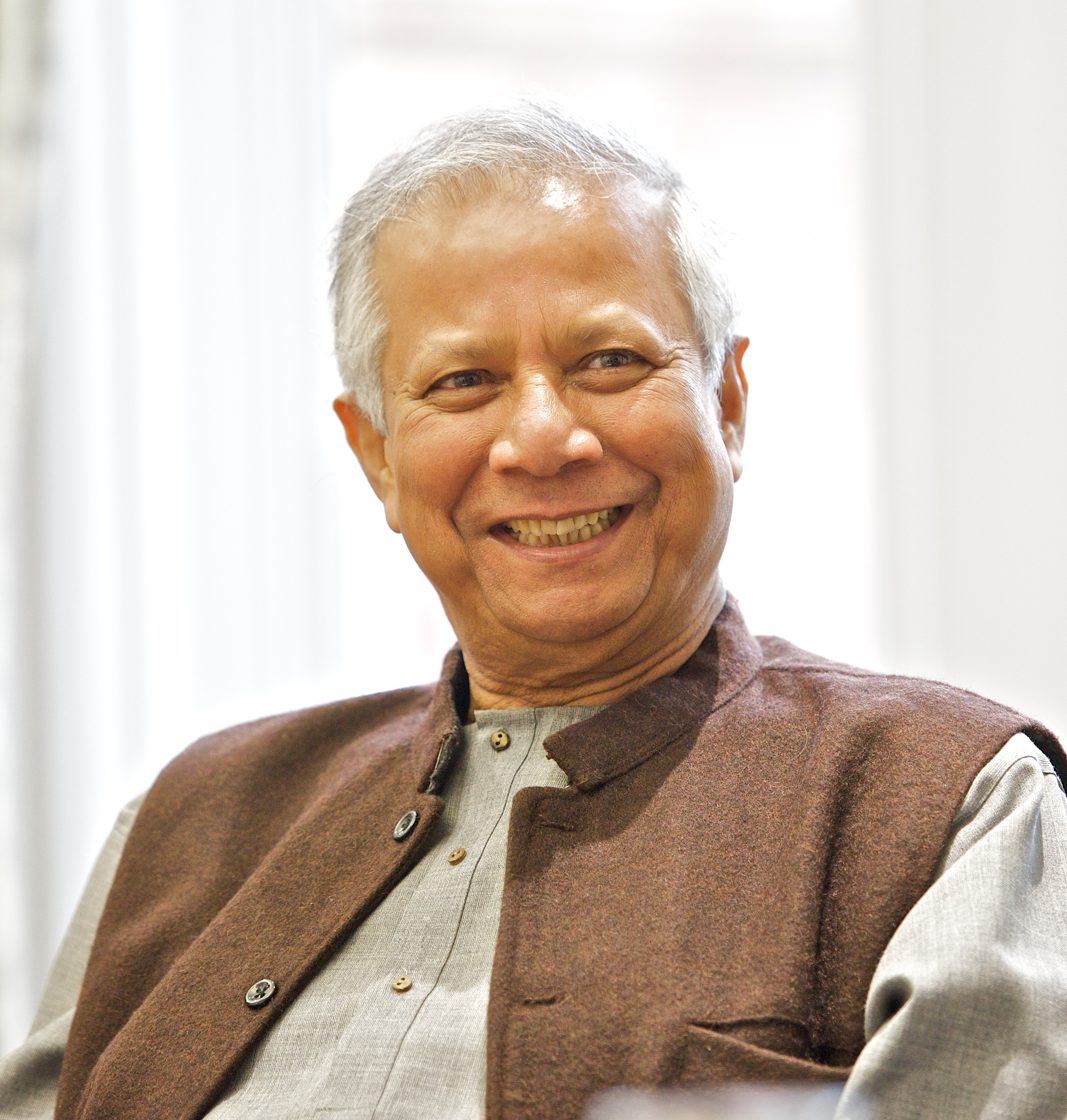
Muhammad Yunus, 2013

Muhammad Yunus, the Bangladeshi entrepreneur, banker, economist, politician and civil society leader, has received numerous awards and honours from governments, universities and organisations around the world, chiefly for his work on microcredit, social business and poverty alleviation. They include the Nobel Peace Prize (2006, shared with Grameen Bank), the Presidential Medal of Freedom (2009), the Congressional Gold Medal (2010), the King Charles III Harmony Award (2025) and the Hillary Rodham Clinton Award (2026). He has also received 72 honorary doctorates from universities in 27 countries.

== Major honours ==
Year	Honour	Awarded by	Country	Ref(s)
1978	President's Award	–	Bangladesh	
1984	Ramon Magsaysay Award (Community Leadership)	–	Philippines	
1987	Independence Award	–	Bangladesh	
1989	Aga Khan Award for Architecture	–	Switzerland	
1994	World Food Prize	World Food Prize Foundation	United States	
1996	International Simón Bolívar Prize	UNESCO / Venezuela	Venezuela	
1998	Prince of Asturias Award (Concord)	Prince of Asturias Foundation	Spain	
1998	Sydney Peace Prize	Sydney Peace Foundation	Australia	
2001	Fukuoka Asian Culture Prize (Grand Prize)	–	Japan	
2003	Volvo Environment Prize	–	Sweden	
2006	Nobel Peace Prize (shared with Grameen Bank)	Norwegian Nobel Committee	Norway	
2009	Presidential Medal of Freedom	President Barack Obama	United States	
2010	Congressional Gold Medal	United States Congress	United States	
2020	Olympic Laurel	International Olympic Committee	Japan	
2025	King Charles III Harmony Award	The King's Foundation	United Kingdom	
2026	Hillary Rodham Clinton Award	Hillary Rodham Clinton and the Georgetown Institute for Women, Peace and Security	United States	

== State honours ==
Ribbon/replica	Decoration	Country	Date	Location	Presenter	Note	Ref(s)
	Independence Award	Bangladesh	1987	Dhaka	President Hussain Muhammad Ershad	The highest civilian honour of Bangladesh.	
	Legion of Honour	France	2004	Paris	President Jacques Chirac	Officer	
	Order of King Abdulaziz	Saudi Arabia	2007	Riyadh	King Abdullah	Second Class, the second-highest civilian honour of Saudi Arabia.	
	Order of the Liberator	Venezuela	11 May 2007	Caracas	President Hugo Chávez	Grand Cordon, the highest civilian honour of Venezuela.	
	Presidential Medal of Freedom	United States	12 August 2009	Washington, D.C.	President Barack Obama	The highest civilian honour of the United States.	
	Order of Merit of the Italian Republic	Italy	26 July 2010	Rome	President of the Republic	Knight Grand Cross, the highest civilian honour of Italy.	
	Order of the Sun of Peru	Peru	27 September 2010	Lima	President Alan García	Grand Cross, the highest civilian honour of Peru.	
	Congressional Gold Medal	United States	17 April 2013	Washington, D.C.	Speaker John Boehner	The highest civilian honour awarded by the United States Congress.	

== Awards and prizes ==
=== Bangladesh ===
Year	Award	Awarded by
1978	Rashtropoti Purushkar (President's Award)	–
1985	Central Bank Award	Bangladesh Bank
1987	Swadhinata Purushkar (Independence Award)	–
1993	Rear Admiral M. A. Khan Memorial Gold Medal Award	–
1994	Dr. Mohammad Ibrahim Memorial Gold Medal Award	–
1995	Rotary Club of Metropolitan Dhaka Foundation Award	Rotary Club of Metropolitan Dhaka
2000	IDEB Gold Medal Award	Institution of Diploma Engineers, Bangladesh
2005	Bangladesh Computer Society Gold Medal	Bangladesh Computer Society

=== International ===
Year	Award	Awarded by	Country
1984	Ramon Magsaysay Award (Community Leadership)	–	Philippines
1989	Aga Khan Award for Architecture	–	Switzerland
1993	Humanitarian Award	CARE	United States
1993	Mohamed Sahabdeen Award for Science (Socio Economic)	–	Sri Lanka
1994	World Food Prize	World Food Prize Foundation	United States
1994	Pfeffer Peace Prize	Fellowship of Reconciliation	United States
1994	Tun Abdul Razak Award	–	Malaysia
1995	Max Schmidheiny Foundation Freedom Prize	Max Schmidheiny Foundation	Switzerland
1996	International Simón Bolívar Prize	UNESCO / Venezuela	Venezuela
1996	Distinguished Alumnus Award	Vanderbilt University	United States
1997	International Activist Award	Gleitsman Foundation	United States
1997	Planetary Consciousness Business Innovation Prize	–	Germany
1997	Help for Self Help Prize	Strømme Foundation	Norway
1997	Man for Peace Award	Together For Peace Foundation	Italy
1997	State of the World Forum Award	State of the World Forum	United States
1998	One World Broadcasting Trust Media Award	–	United Kingdom
1998	Prince of Asturias Award for Concord	–	Spain
1998	Sydney Peace Prize	Sydney Peace Foundation	Australia
1998	Ozaki (Gakudo) Award	Ozaki Yukio Memorial Foundation	Japan
1998	Indira Gandhi Prize for Peace, Disarmament and Development	Indira Gandhi Memorial Trust	India
1998	Juste of the Year	Les Justes D'or	France
1999	Rotary Award for World Understanding	–	United States
1999	Golden Pegasus Award	Tuscan Regional Government	Italy
1999	Roma Award for Peace and Humanitarian Action	Municipality of Rome	Italy
1999	Rathindra Puraskar (for 1998)	Visva-Bharati	India
2000	OMEGA Award of Excellence for Lifetime Achievement	–	Switzerland
2000	Medal of the Presidency of the Italian Senate	–	Italy
2000	King Hussein Humanitarian Leadership Award	King Hussein Foundation	Jordan
2001	Artusi Prize	Comune di Forlimpopoli	Italy
2001	Fukuoka Asian Culture Prize (Grand Prize)	–	Japan
2001	Ho Chi Minh Award	Ho Chi Minh City People's Committee	Vietnam
2001	International Cooperation Prize	Caja de Granada	Spain
2001	NAVARRA International Aid Award	Government of Navarra with Caja Laboral	Spain
2002	Mahatma Gandhi Award	M.K. Gandhi Institute for Nonviolence	United States
2003	World Technology Network Award for Finance	World Technology Network	United Kingdom
2003	Volvo Environment Prize	–	Sweden
2003	National Merit Order	President of Colombia	Colombia
2003	Medal of the Painter Oswaldo Guayasamín	UNESCO	France
2004	Telecinco Award for Better Path Towards Solidarity	Telecinco (Channel 5)	Spain
2004	City of Orvieto Award	Municipality of Orvieto	Italy
2004	The Economist Award for Social and Economic Innovation	The Economist	United States
2004	Award for Extraordinary Contribution to Social Change	World Affairs Council of Northern California	United States
2004	Leadership in Social Entrepreneurship Award	Fuqua School of Business, Duke University	United States
2004	Premio Galileo 2000 – Special Prize for Peace	Ina Assitalia Firenze	Italy
2004	Nikkei Asia Prize for Regional Growth	Nihon Keizai Shimbun (Nikkei)	Japan
2005	Golden Cross of the Civil Order of Social Solidarity	Spanish Ministry of Labour and Social Affairs	Spain
2005	Freedom Award	America's Freedom Foundation, Provo, Utah	United States
2005	Prize Il Ponte	Fondazione Europea Guido Venosta	Italy
2005	Foundation of Justice	–	Spain
2006	Neustadt Award	Kennedy School of Government, Harvard University	United States
2006	Global Citizen of the Year Award	Patel Foundation for Global Understanding, Tampa	United States
2006	Franklin D. Roosevelt Freedom Award	Roosevelt Institute	Netherlands
2006	ITU World Information Society Award	International Telecommunication Union	Switzerland
2006	Seoul Peace Prize	Seoul Peace Prize Cultural Foundation	South Korea
2006	Convivencia (Good Fellowship) of Ceuta	Fundación Premio Convivencia, Ceuta	Spain
2006	Nobel Peace Prize	Norwegian Nobel Committee	Norway
2006	Disaster Mitigation Award	FIRST INDIA Disaster Management Congress	India
2006	Shera Bangalee	ETV	India
2007	Global Trailblazer Award	Vital Voices	United States
2007	ABICC Award for Leadership in Global Trade	–	United States
2007	Social Entrepreneur Award	Geoffrey Palmer Center for Social Entrepreneurship and the Law, Pepperdine School of Law	United States
2007	Global Entrepreneurship Leader Award	National Foundation for Teaching Entrepreneurship	United States
2007	Red Cross Gold Medal	–	Spain
2007	Rabindranath Tagore Birth Centenary Plaque	Asiatic Society, Kolkata	India
2007	EFR-Business Week Award	University of Rotterdam	Netherlands
2007	Nichols-Chancellor Medal	Vanderbilt University	United States
2007	Vision Award	Global Economic Network, Berlin	Germany
2007	BAFI Global Achievement Award	Bangladesh-American Foundation Inc.	United States
2007	Rubin Museum Mandala Award	–	United States
2007	Sakaal Person of the Year Award	–	India
2007	1st AHPADA Global Award	ASEAN Handicraft Promotion and Development Association	Philippines
2007	Medal of Honor	Government of Santa Catarina State	Brazil
2007	UN South-South Cooperation Award	United Nations	United States
2008	Project Concern Award	Project Concern International, Santa Barbara	United States
2008	International Women's Health Coalition Award	–	United States
2008	Kitakyushu Environmental Award	Mayor of Kitakyushu	Japan
2008	Chancellor's Medal	York College	United States
2008	President's Medal	Lehman College	United States
2008	Human Security Award	Muslim Public Affairs Council	United States
2008	Annual Award for Development	OPEC Fund for International Development (OFID)	Austria
2008	Humanitarian Award	International Association of Lions Clubs	United States
2008	Friend of Children	Save the Children	Spain
2008	AGI International Science Award	University of Cologne	Germany
2008	Corine International Book Award (for Creating a World Without Poverty)	Bavarian Government	Germany
2008	Two Wing Prize	Freie Universität Berlin	Germany
2008	Global Humanitarian Award	The Tech Museum, San Jose	United States
2008	World Affairs Council Award	–	United States
2008	Full Impact Award	–	United States
2009	Estoril Global Issues Distinguished Book Prize	–	Portugal
2009	Eisenhower Medal for Leadership and Service	–	United States
2009	Golden Biatec Award	Economic Club	Slovakia
2009	Gold Medal of Honor Award	–	United States
2009	PICMET Leadership in Technology Management Award	–	United States
2009	Presidential Medal of Freedom	President Barack Obama	United States
2009	Sustainable Development Award	Ecology and Development Foundation	Spain
2009	Bayreuth Leadership Award	University of Bayreuth	Germany
2010	Social Entrepreneur of the Year Award	The Asian Awards	United Kingdom
2010	Prize for Ethical Business Award	Creighton University, Omaha	United States
2010	Presidential Medallion Award	University of Illinois Urbana-Champaign	United States
2010	Presidential Medal Award	Emory University, Atlanta	United States
2010	SolarWorld Einstein Award	–	Spain
2010	Presidential Medal Award	Miami Dade College	United States
2010	Congressional Gold Medal	United States Congress	United States
2010	Order of the Sun, Grand Cross	–	Peru
2010	Global Award, 3rd China Poverty Eradication Awards	State Council Leading Group Office of Poverty Alleviation and Development; China Foundation for Poverty Alleviation	China
2011	St. Vincent de Paul Award	DePaul University, Chicago	United States
2011	Elon Medal for Entrepreneurial Leadership	–	United States
2012	Jean Mayer Global Citizen Award	Institute for Global Leadership, Tufts University	United States
2012	Outstanding Entrepreneur of Our Time / Best Humanitarian of the Year	OFC Venture Challenge	United States
2012	Transformational Leadership Award	Wright Foundation for Transformational Leadership	United States
2012	Freedom Award	National Civil Rights Museum, Memphis	United States
2013	Salute to Greatness Award	Martin Luther King Center	United States
2013	Albert Schweitzer Humanitarian Award	Quinnipiac University, Connecticut	United States
2013	Global Treasure Award	Skoll Foundation, Oxford	United Kingdom
2013	Lifetime Achievement Award for Social Entrepreneurship	Forbes 400 Philanthropy Forum	United States
2013	Asian American/Asian Research Leadership Award	–	United States
2020	Olympic Laurel	International Olympic Committee	Japan
2021	Champion of Global Change Award	United Nations Foundation	United States
2025	King Charles III Harmony Award	The King's Foundation	United Kingdom
2026	Hillary Rodham Clinton Award	Hillary Rodham Clinton and the Georgetown Institute for Women, Peace and Security	United States

== Scholastic ==
Muhammad Yunus has been awarded a total of 72 honorary doctorate degrees from universities across 27 countries.

No.	Year	Degree	Institution	Country	Notes
1	1992	Doctor of Letters	University of East Anglia	United Kingdom	First honorary degree
2	1993	Doctor of Humanities	Oberlin College	United States	
3	1994	Doctor of Law	Haverford College	United States	
4	1995	Doctor of Law	University of Toronto	Canada	
5	1996	Doctor of Law	Haverford College	United States	
6	1996	Doctor of Law	Warwick University	United Kingdom	
7	1997	Doctor of Public Service	Saint Xavier's University	United States	
8	1998	Doctor of Civil Law, Honoris Causa	University of the South	United States	
9	1998	Doctor Honoris Causa	Katholieke Universiteit Leuven	Belgium	
10	1998	Doctor of Social Science, Honoris Causa	Yale University	United States	
11	1998	Doctor of Humane Letters, Honoris Causa	Brigham Young University	United States	
12	1998	Doctor of Science in Economics (Honorary)	University of Sydney	Australia	
13	2000	Doctor of the University (Honorary)	Queensland University of Technology	Australia	
14	2000	Doctor in Economics and Business (Laurea Honoris Causa)	University of Turin	Italy	
15	2002	Doctor of Humane Letters, Honoris Causa	Colgate University	United States	
16	2003	Doctor Honoris Causa	Université Catholique de Louvain	Belgium	
17	2003	Doctor Honoris Causa	Universidad Nacional de Cuyo	Argentina	
18	2003	Doctor of Economics, Honoris Causa	University of Natal	South Africa	
19	2004	Doctor of Science, Honoris Causa	Bidhan Chandra Krishi Viswavidyalaya	India	
20	2004	Doctor of Technology, Honoris Causa	Asian Institute of Technology	Thailand	
21	2004	Doctor in Business Economics, Honoris Causa	University of Florence	Italy	
22	2004	Doctor in Pedagogy (Honorary)	University of Bologna	Italy	
23	2004	Doctor Honoris Causa	Universidad Complutense Madrid	Spain	
24	2006	Honorary Doctorate in Economics	University of Venda	South Africa	
25	2006	Doctor of Humane Letters	American University of Beirut	Lebanon	
26	2006	Doctor Honoris Causa	University of Alicante	Spain	
27	2006	Doctor Honoris Causa	University of Valencia	Spain	
28	2006	Doctor Honoris Causa	Jaume I University	Spain	
29	2007	Doctor of Laws (Honorary)	University of Dhaka	Bangladesh	First honorary degree in Bangladesh
30	2007	Doctor of Humanities (Honorary)	Rikkyo University	Japan	
31	2007	Doctor of Economics (Honorary)	Universiti Sains Malaysia	Malaysia	
32	2007	Doctor of Philosophy (Honorary)	Ewha Womans University	South Korea	
33	2007	Doctor of Humanities, Honoris Causa	EARTH University	Costa Rica	
34	2008	Honorary Degree	Regis University	United States	
35	2008	Honorary Degree	University of British Columbia	Canada	
36	2008	Honorary Doctorate	Moscow State University	Russia	
37	2008	Honoris Causa in Science of Cooperation and Development	Sapienza University of Rome	Italy	
38	2008	Doctor of Letters (D.Litt)	Glasgow Caledonian University	United Kingdom	
39	2008	Honorary Doctorate	University of Glasgow	United Kingdom	
40	2009	Honorary Degree	Kobe University	Japan	
41	2009	Doctor of Law (Honorary)	University of Pennsylvania	United States	
42	2009	Honorary Degree	Hokkaido University	Japan	
43	2009	Honorary Doctorate	Istanbul Commerce University	Turkey	
44	2010	Doctor of Humane Letters	Duke University	United States	
45	2010	Honorary Doctorate	Kwansei Gakuin University	Japan	
46	2010	Doctor of Laws, Honoris Causa	Carleton University	Canada	
47	2010	Doctor Honoris Causa	San Ignacio de Loyola University	Peru	
48	2010	Doctor Honoris Causa	Universidad Nacional Mayor de San Marcos	Peru	
49	2010	Doctor Honoris Causa	University of Mons	Belgium	
50	2011	Doctor of Science in Economics (Honorary)	London School of Economics	United Kingdom	
51	2012	Honorary Doctorate	Tohoku University	Japan	
52	2012	Doctor of Humane Letters	Tuskegee University	United States	
53	2012	Doctor of Letters	Emory University	United States	
54	2013	Doctoris Honoris Causa	European University of Tirana	Albania	
55	2013	Honorary Degree	University of Salford	United Kingdom	
56	2013	Doctor Honoris Causa	Bolivia University of Aquino	Bolivia	
57	2014	Doctor of Philosophy Honoris Causa	Dublin City University	Ireland	
58	2015	Doctorate Honoris Causa	Federal University of Paraná	Brazil	
59	2016	Honorary Doctor of Humane Letters	Babson College	United States	
60	2017	Honorary Doctor of Science	Chandigarh University	India	
61	2018	Doctor of Philosophy Honoris Causa	Amity University Rajasthan	India	
62	2018	Honorary Degree	Autonomous University of Baja California	Mexico	
63	2019	Honorary Doctorate	National and Kapodistrian University of Athens	Greece	
64	2019	Doctor Honoris Causa	Menéndez Pelayo International University	Spain	
65	2021	Honorary Doctor of Literature	Sharda University	India	
66	2022	Honorary Doctorate in Economic Sciences	University Putra Malaysia	Malaysia	
67	2022	Ph.D. Honoris Causa	Cesar Vallejo University	Peru	
68	2023	Honorary Doctorate	Ryukoku University	Japan	
69	29 March 2025	Honorary Doctorate	Peking University	China	
70	14 May 2025	Honorary Doctorate of Literature (D.Litt)	University of Chittagong	Bangladesh	
71	30 May 2025	Honorary Doctorate	Soka University	Japan	
72	13 August 2025	Honorary Doctorate of Philosophy in Social Business	Universiti Kebangsaan Malaysia (UKM)	Malaysia	

== See also ==
- List of titles and honours of Charles III
- King Charles III Harmony Award
