= Herbert Macdonald (sportsman) =

Jamaican sportsman (1902–1991)

Herbert George De Lorme Macdonald (1902–1991), KBE, was a Jamaican footballer, tennis player, writer, sports administrator and promoter.

== Early life ==
He was born on 23 May 1902. He attended Wolmer's Boys School where he excelled at a number of sports. Later he represented Jamaica at football and tennis.

== Career ==
He became the president of the Jamaica Olympic Association, the West Indies Olympic Association, the Jamaica Amateur Athletics Association and the Amateur Swimming Association of Jamaica. He was in the Jamaican Olympic delegation in 1948 and became the manager of the Jamaica team to the Olympic Games in Helsinki, 1952 and the subsequent three games. In 1959 Jamaica was awarded the right to host the Central American and Caribbean Games of 1962. Macdonald was reported to have approached Prime Minister Norman Manley and opposition leader Sir Alexander Bustamante with the suggestion of building a stadium for the Games. They agreed and after discussion, a £100,000 downpayment was paid for 80 acres (32.4 hectares) of British Army land. The British government wrote off the remaining £200,000 as an independence gift. He was a principal organiser - with Roy Anthony Bridge - of the 1966 British Empire and Commonwealth Games which were held at the National Stadium. For many years he was chairman of National Sport Ltd. (Institute of Sports Ltd [INSPORTS]).

At the Mexico Olympics of 1968, he carried the Jamaican flag at the opening ceremony - instead of an athlete - to the dismay of many in the team who then boycotted the ceremony.

He was also vice-president of the Jamaican Football Association, a member of the executive of the Jamaica Cricket Board of Control and the Jamaica Boxing Board of Control. He was chairman of National Sports Ltd. (INSPORT) and he managed the National Stadium.

He wrote a history of the Boys' Champs, Kingston Cricket Club and a history of the British Empire and Commonwealth Games.

== Awards ==
Macdonald was the first Jamaica National Sportsman of the Year. In 1967 he was awarded the Olympic Diploma of Merit and was made Knight Commander of the Most Excellent Order of the British Empire for his life's work after the hosting of the Commonwealth Games.

== Legacy ==
A bust in his honour was created by Jamaican sculptor Alvin Marriott and it is now in Independence Park. There is also a tunnel named after him at the National Stadium which he promoted.
