= King Charles III Harmony Award =

- Description: Long-term outstanding commitment to, and support for, the Harmony philosophy of Charles III
- Location: St James's Palace, London
- Country: United Kingdom
- Presented by: The King's Foundation
- First award: 2024
- Website: kings-foundation.org

The King Charles III Harmony Award is an award presented by The King's Foundation, a British charity founded by Charles III in 1990, to an individual in recognition of long-term outstanding commitment to, and support for, the King's "Harmony" philosophy, which looks to prioritise sustainability and nature across all sectors. It is the final and special award presented at the Foundation's annual awards ceremony at St James's Palace.

The award was first presented on 11 June 2024, at the Foundation's inaugural awards ceremony, to former United Nations Secretary-General Ban Ki-moon. The second recipient, on 12 June 2025, was Nobel Peace Prize laureate Muhammad Yunus of Bangladesh.

== Background ==
=== The King's Foundation ===
The King's Foundation is a charity founded in 1990 by Charles when he was the Prince of Wales; it was formerly known as The Prince's Foundation. It is based at Dumfries House in Cumnock, Ayrshire, and the King is its Royal Founding President. Its work covers education in heritage crafts and rural skills, architecture and urbanism, sustainable food and farming, and health and wellbeing.

=== Harmony philosophy ===
The Foundation's work is underpinned by the King's philosophy of "Harmony", which holds that by understanding the balance, order and relationships between humanity and the natural world, a more sustainable future can be created. It treats everything in nature, including people, as interconnected and seeks to solve environmental challenges by working with nature rather than against it. The philosophy was set out in the book Harmony: A New Way of Looking at Our World, published in 2010 under the name of the then Prince of Wales, which covers subjects from urban planning and farming to health, waste and circular economies.

A documentary on the philosophy, Finding Harmony: A King's Vision, was made by The King's Foundation and Prime Video, with actress Kate Winslet as narrator.

== The award ==
=== Establishment ===
The King's Foundation Awards were launched in June 2024. The inaugural ceremony took place on 11 June 2024 at St James's Palace, London, with the King in attendance, and was described as set to become a regular fixture in the Foundation's calendar. Awards were presented in nine categories, with the Harmony Award as the closing presentation. At the first ceremony, the King said the award was created to recognise individuals who champion the values underpinning the Foundation's mission and his hope for a world living in harmony with nature.

=== Criteria ===
The Foundation describes the award as a special award given to an individual in recognition of long-term outstanding commitment to, and support for, the Foundation or the King's philosophy more generally. By 2025 the Foundation's wording tied it specifically to the Harmony philosophy. Unlike the other categories, which recognise students, alumni, teachers, partners and organisations connected with the Foundation, it is open to individuals whose work reflects the philosophy more broadly. The Foundation's published materials do not set out a nomination or selection procedure for the Harmony Award.

== Recipients ==
Year	Recipient	Country	Notes	Ref(s)
2024	Ban Ki-moon	South Korea	Eighth Secretary-General of the United Nations (2007–2016). First recipient.	
2025	Muhammad Yunus	Bangladesh	2006 Nobel Peace laureate and founder of the Grameen Bank. Presented on 12 June 2025.	

== 2024: Ban Ki-moon ==
The inaugural award was presented to Ban Ki-moon on 11 June 2024 by the King at St James's Palace. The Foundation's citation noted that he served as the eighth Secretary-General of the United Nations from January 2007 to December 2016, played a significant role in securing the Paris Agreement and in promoting the Sustainable Development Goals, and was a strong advocate for the creation of UN Women. It also noted his roles as deputy chair of The Elders, founder (in 2017) of the Ban Ki-moon Centre for Global Citizens, and co-chair of the Global Center on Adaptation, and linked his outlook to the Foundation's own through his view that lasting change in one area needs a harmonious approach.

Kellogg College, Oxford, where Ban is a Bynum Tudor Fellow, reported that he was praised for supporting a "sustainable relationship between people, planet and place on a local and global scale". The Ban Ki-moon Centre for Global Citizens described the award as a lifetime award for his work on the climate crisis as Secretary-General.

=== Ceremony ===
About 250 guests attended, including nominees, their families, celebrity ambassadors and supporters. Awards were presented by ambassadors and supporters including Raymond Blanc, Rod Stewart and Penny Lancaster, David Beckham, Sienna Miller, Edward Enninful and Naomi Campbell, Patrick Grant, Sarah Beeny and Alan Titchmarsh. Guests were entertained by pipers from the National Piping Centre and by the Tetbury-based Rock Choir.

Award	Winner	Presented by
Innovation in Practice	Ambulance for Monuments	Raymond Blanc
Teaching Award	David Cranswick	Rod Stewart and Penny Lancaster
Emerging Talent	Kadijah Dumbuya	David Beckham
Young Entrepreneur	Isabelle Pennington-Edmead	Sienna Miller
International Impact	The Rose Town Foundation for the Built Environment, Jamaica	Edward Enninful and Naomi Campbell
Advocate of the Year	Jamie Oliver and Jimmy Doherty	Patrick Grant
Corporate Champion	Octopus Energy	Sarah Beeny
Partnership of the Year	University College of Estate Management	Alan Titchmarsh
King Charles III Harmony Award	Ban Ki-moon	The King

== 2025: Muhammad Yunus ==
The second award was presented on 12 June 2025 at the Foundation's 2025 ceremony at St James's Palace, held as the Foundation marked its 35th anniversary and supported by the jeweller Pragnell. Its citation described Yunus as having spent his life promoting social business principles and encouraging sustainable, socially responsible projects, with a significant impact on poverty alleviation in Bangladesh and beyond. At the time Yunus was serving as Chief Adviser of Bangladesh's interim government, and was on a four-day visit to the United Kingdom.

Before the ceremony, the King received Yunus in a private audience at Buckingham Palace, which lasted about 30 minutes; Yunus's press secretary said the King had written a foreword for one of Yunus's books. The King also hosted a dinner on 11 June marking the award.

The Foundation's account credits Dame Ann Limb, chair of trustees, with presenting the award to Yunus, while several press reports said the King presented it. Bangladesh government statements said the award recognised his contribution to harmonious coexistence between people, nature and the environment. Yunus called it "a wonderful prize" and said it would inspire young people in Bangladesh to build the country they dream of.

=== Ceremony ===
The King toured stands showcasing the Foundation's work and met ambassadors and supporters including David Beckham, Stanley Tucci and Penny Lancaster, along with guests including Meryl Streep and Kate Winslet. A 35th-anniversary cake made by Juliet Sear was cut at the event.

Award	Winner	Presented by
Emerging Talent	Emily Hurst	David Beckham
International Impact	The Akoje Residency	Kate Winslet
Young Entrepreneur	Barnaby Horn	–
Teaching Award	Claudia Peñaranda Fuentes	Raymond Blanc
Innovation in Practice	Yasmeen Lari	Stanley Tucci and Felicity Blunt
Advocate of the Year	Patrick Holden	–
Community Partnership of the Year	Auchinleck Primary School	Alan Titchmarsh
Corporate of the Year	Patagonia	Sarah Beeny
King Charles III Harmony Award	Muhammad Yunus	Dame Ann Limb

== See also ==
- List of awards received by Charles III
- List of awards and honours received by Muhammad Yunus
