= Ivan Joseph Martin Osiier =

Danish fencer (1888–1965)

Ivan Osiier
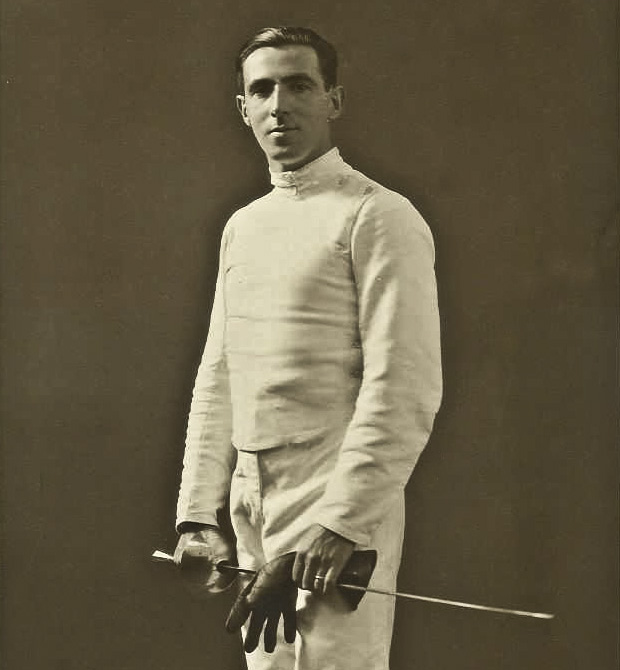

Personal information
- Nationality: Danish
- Born: Ivan Joseph Martin Osiier; December 16, 1888 Copenhagen, Denmark
- Died: December 23, 1965 (aged 77) Copenhagen, Denmark
- Occupation(s): Surgeon, Physician
- Height: 170 cm (5 ft 7 in)
- Spouse: Ellen Osiier

Sport
- Sport: Fencing
Medal record
Representing Denmark
Fencing
Silver medal – second place	1912 Summer Olympics	Individual épée

Ivan Joseph Martin Osiier (December 16, 1888 – December 23, 1965), was a Danish Olympic medalist, and world champion, fencer who fenced foil, épée, and saber. He was given the Olympic Diploma of Merit during his career. He is also one of only five athletes who have competed in the Olympics over a span of 40 years.

== Personal life ==
Osiier was born in Copenhagen, Denmark, and was Jewish. His parents were Martin Moses Meyer Osiier (1861–1933) and Hanne Henriette Ruben (1865–1922). He was married to Ellen Osiier, who became the first female Olympic fencing champion by winning the women's foil at the 1924 Summer Olympics.

He attended the secondary school Borgerdydskolen (The School of Civic Virtue) in Copenhagen, and later studied medicine. He was a surgeon at Garrison Hospital in Copenhagen in 1915–17. He later served as a physician. He was forced to flee Denmark during the Nazi occupation of Denmark due to his being Jewish, and went to Sweden where he worked at Saint Göran Hospital.

== Fencing career ==
=== Championships ===
At fencing competitions in Denmark, Osiier won 25 events between 1913 and 1929. In fencing competitions for Scandinavia, Osilier won 13 events between 1921 and 1933.

=== Olympics ===
Osiier first competed at the 1908 Summer Olympics and continued to appear in consecutive Olympics up to the 1948 Summer Olympics. During the 1912 Summer Olympics, Osiier finished in second during the épée event. Osiier withdrew from the 1936 Berlin Olympics in Nazi Germany, as did Danish Jewish wrestler (and 1932 Olympic silver medalist) Abraham Kurland.

He is one of only four athletes who have competed in the Olympics over a span of 40 years, along with sailors Magnus Konow, Paul Elvstrøm, Durward Knowles and showjumper Ian Millar. Apart from competitions, Osiier worked for the Denmark Fencing Federation as their leader. The Olympic Diploma of Merit was given to Osiier during his career.

== Hall of Fame ==
Osiier was inducted into the International Jewish Sports Hall of Fame in 1986.

== See also ==
- List of athletes with the most appearances at Olympic Games
- List of select Jewish fencers
- List of Jewish Olympic medalists
