= Abdel Moneim Wahby =

Egyptian basketball player

Personal information
- Nationality: Egyptian
- Born: 11 November 1911 Cairo, Egypt
- Died: 8 May 1988 (aged 76) Cairo, Egypt

Sport
- Sport: Basketball

Abdel Moneim Wahby (Arabic: عبد المنعم وهبي; 11 November 1911 – 8 May 1988) was an Egyptian basketball player who played for Al Ahly, referee and administrator. He played for the Egypt national basketball team in the 1936 Olympics. As a referee, he worked at the 1948 Olympics and 1952 Olympics (including the USA-USSR final). He served as the president of the Egyptian Basketball Federation (1952–1969), president of AFABA (current FIBA Africa) (1961–1969), Vice President of the FIBA (1961–1968), President of the FIBA (1968–1976) and President of the Egyptian Olympic Committee (1972–1974). He was enshrined as a contributor in the FIBA Hall of Fame in 2007.
