= Roy Anthony Bridge =

Jamaican sports shooter (1921–2000)

Tony Bridge
Personal information
- Born: 4 February 1921 Kingston, Jamaica
- Died: 13 December 2000 (aged 79) Kingston, Jamaica

Sport
- Sport: Sports shooting

Roy Anthony (Tony) Bridge, OBE (4 February 1921 – 13 December 2000) was a Jamaican member of the International Olympic Committee (IOC).

Bridge was active in sport from 1947 until his death in 2000. He was appointed to the International Olympic Committee IOC in 1973, and was the eighth most senior member at the time of his death. He also represented the West Indies Federation at the 1960 Summer Olympics and Jamaica at the 1964 Summer Olympics.

== Biography ==
Bridge was born 4 February 1921 in Kingston, Jamaica. He attended Wolmer's School in Kingston. Upon graduation he joined the Jamaican Civil Service and eventually joined his father at Novelty Trading Company, which imported books and magazines into the island. He rose to the position of Managing Director.

== Sport ==
His involvement in sport was wide-ranging and included terms as the vice president of the Jamaica Boxing Board of Control (1947–62), President of the Jamaica Amateur Athletic Association (1958–77), Vice President of the Jamaica Rifle Association (1960–62), first vocal of the Pan American Sports Organization (1971–75), and the Vice Chairman of the Commonwealth Games Federation (1974–1982).

Along with Sir Herbert Macdonald, Bridge was instrumental in organising the 1966 Commonwealth Games in Kingston, Jamaica. This led to his interest in the Olympics and his eventual election to the IOC in 1973 at the 74th session of the IOC in Varna, Bulgaria. At that meeting four new members of the IOC were elected: Mr. Roy Anthony (Tony) Bridge for Jamaica, Mr. Manuel Gonzales Guerra for Cuba, Mr. Ashwini Kumar for India, Mr. Keba M'Baye for Senegal.
