= Angelo Bolanachi =

Greek-Egyptian athlete and sports official

- Άγγελος Βολανάκης
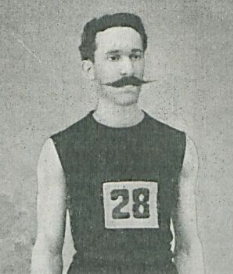
- Bolanachi c. December 1904
- Born: Angelo Christos Bolanachi; 20 May 1878; Alexandria, Egypt
- Died: 26 July 1963 (aged 85); Lausanne, Switzerland
- Citizenship: Egyptian (until 1932); Greek (from 1933)
- Occupations: Sports administrator Member of the International Olympic Committee
- Awards: Olympic Diploma of Merit (1949)

Angelo Christos Bolanachi (Note: Prior to 1949, he romanized his last name as "Bolanachi". That year, he began using "Bolanaki," which he used until his death. Additionally, some sources, including Olympedia, list his first name as "Angelos.") (Greek: Άγγελος Βολανάκης; 20 May 1878 - 26 July 1963) was an Egyptian Greek athlete and sports official. He represented Egypt in international athletic competitions in his early years before becoming Egypt's first International Olympic Committee (IOC) representative in 1910. That year, he also helped found the Egyptian Olympic Committee. He represented Egypt until 1932, when he stepped down from the position. Starting in 1933, he became the IOC representative for Greece. He received the Olympic Diploma of Merit in 1949 and continued to represent Greece until his death in 1963.

== Early life ==
Angelo Christos Bolanachi was born in Alexandria on 20 May 1878. His father, Christos, founded a distillery in the city in 1884, which produced cognac, rum, and whiskey. The distillery was successful, and placed the Bolanachi family firmly into the elite Egyptian Greek upper class. He was educated in Paris at the Lycée Condorcet.

=== Athletic career ===
Bolanachi won the French school's tennis championship in 1896, his first athletic success. Starting at the age of 17, he trained for sprinting events on the grounds of Racing Club de France. He also competed in the high jump and long jump. He was the Egyptian national champion in the 100 metre and 200 metre sprints in 1899 and 1900. In 1902, he ran 100 metres in 10.8 seconds, which gave him the Egyptian, Ottoman, and Greek national records, as well as a tie for the world record. For this, Bolanachi was deemed "The Champion of Three Continents" by the French journal L'Éducation Physique. In 1903, he took part in 100 metre and 200 metre races in Alexandria, Athens, and Smyrna. These appearances made Bolanachi the first Egyptian to participate in international athletic competitions abroad.

== Sports official career ==
=== Pre-IOC activities ===
In 1906, he transitioned from an athlete to a sports official. That same year, he met Pierre de Coubertin, one of the founders of the modern International Olympic Committee (IOC). He also began regular correspondence with IOC member Godefroy de Blonay around this time. He established numerous sporting clubs around Egypt, including the General Sports Club, a national Egyptian sporting organization. Starting in 1908, he organised national championships in Alexandria and Cairo, and in 1910 the General Sports Club was converted in the Sports Federation of Egypt by order of Khedive Abbas II of Egypt and Prince Omar Toussoun.

=== IOC member for Egypt (1910–1932) ===
During the Olympic Session in Luxembourg, from 11 to 13 June 1910, Bolanachi was named the first representative of the IOC for Egypt, a role he held until 1932, all while being of Greek ethnicity. His early ambition was to prepare a bid for Alexandria to host the 1916 Summer Olympics. Bolanachi also established the Egyptian Olympic Committee (EOC), becoming the Secretary-General upon its foundation on 19 January 1914, with Prince Omar Toussoun as the first President of the committee. (Note: Wacker, citing local Egyptian archives, claims that the EOC was founded in 1914. Meanwhile, Kamel claims that the EOC was established on 13 June 1910, a year that the IOC also published.) The IOC recognised the EOC that year as well. One of his first actions in these positions was the announcement of the organization of a sports festival to commence in Alexandria to commemorate the 20th anniversary of the founding of the IOC. Three months later, on 5 April, the first Olympic flag, designed by de Coubertin the previous year, was raised during the festival. He used the gathering, which was attended by Khedive Abbas II, as means to boost Alexandria's bid to host the 1916 Olympics. It remains unknown whether Bolanachi himself designed the flag based on de Coubertin's design, or if it was a gift from de Coubertin in Paris. In any case, the festival marks the first time the Olympic rings were flown, around six years before they were introduced to the Olympic Games. Ultimately, the 1916 Games would be cancelled due to World War I.

However, for the next games that occurred, the 1920 Summer Olympics in Antwerp, Bolanachi was a leading figure in sending the first delegation of Egyptian athletes to a Games, consisting of a football team, two track athletes, two gymnasts, a weightlifter, and a wrestler. On their participation, Bolanachi said the athletes "represented the Egyptian Nation very well and were repeatedly admired and applauded by the public. The result of the participation of these few athletes will be of great use for the future development of sports education in Egypt."

==== Alexandria Stadium ====
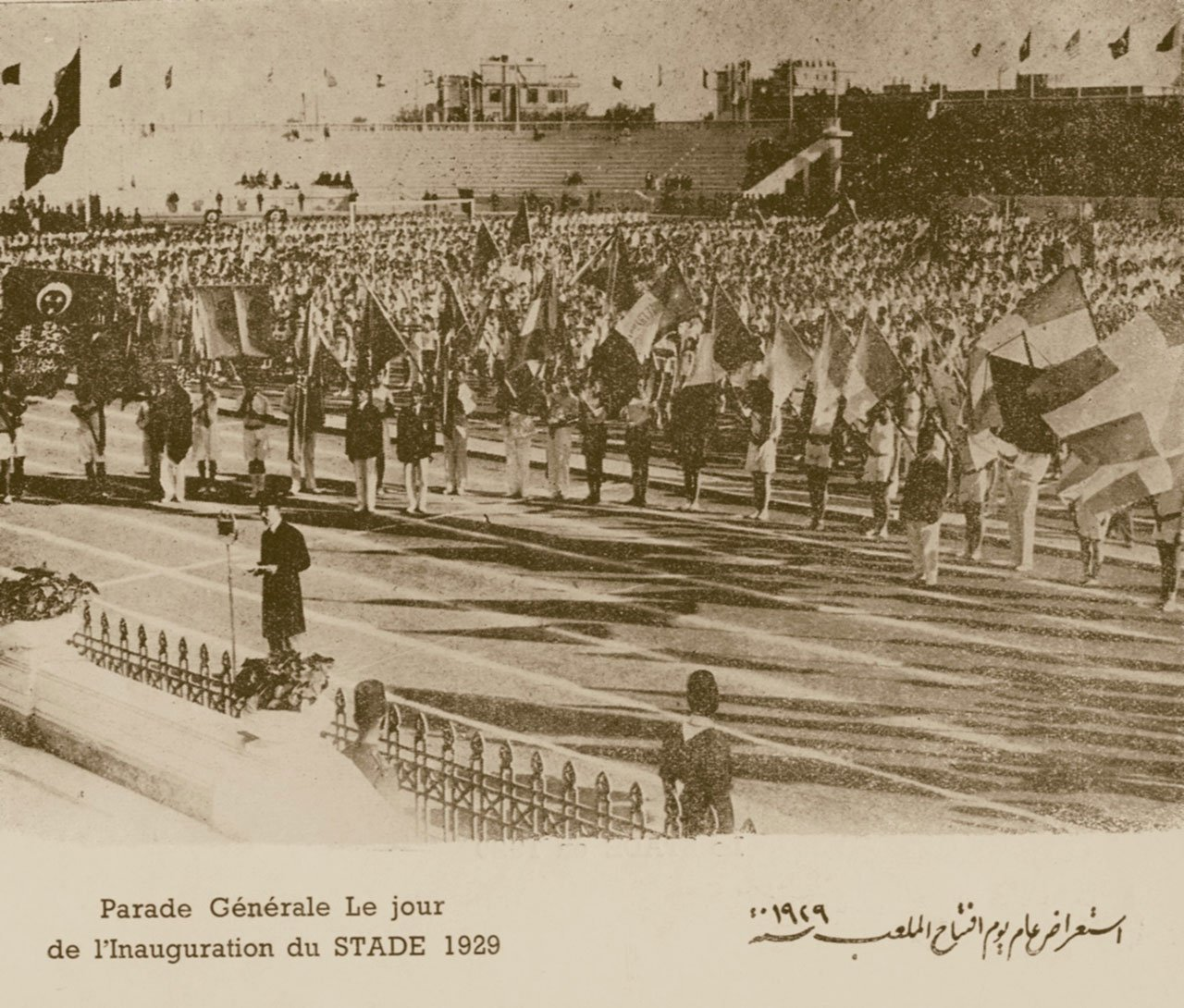
Alexandria Stadium during its opening ceremony in 1929

Part of Bolanachi's original plan for Alexandria to host the 1916 Olympics included plans for the construction of a stadium atop the site of an ancient Ptolemaic stadium. In 1918, Bolanachi held another festival to support the development of sports on a national level, specifically through the support for a new stadium in Alexandria. The new Sultan of Egypt, Fuad I, was in attendance, and the following year, the city of Alexandria announced it had collected donations from Fuad I, Prince Omar Toussoun, and Bolanachi himself, totaling E£6,500, of which E£1,000 came from Bolanachi. This amount met the budget requirements for the construction of the stadium, which began in 1921. Alexandria Stadium was completed in 1928.

==== African Games ====
The African Games were first announced at the IOC Session in Rome in 1923, with the original plan for Algiers to host the first edition of the Games in 1925. However, Algerian officials wrote in 1924 that the city neither had the budget nor the organizational help to host the Games. Following this, Bolanachi received an official letter from the IOC, which invited him to organise the 1927 Games in Alexandria. Although supported by the British government in his position as General Commissioner of the Games, Bolanachi proposed delaying the Games to 1929 due to a convoluted political situation and the ongoing construction of the stadium in Alexandria, which the IOC approved. An official invitation letter for the 1929 Games, scheduled for April 1929, were sent out to ministers across the various colonies of the continent. However, the Games were met with backlash, particularly from British colonial officials, who believed them to be Pan-Africanist propaganda. On 11 May 1928, British colonial representatives officially declared their non-participation for the Games, with other colonies following suit in short order. This led to the cancellation of the 1929 Games on 19 February 1929.

==== Citizenship controversy and ouster ====
Bolanachi also experienced opposition to the Games within Egypt, largely from influential members of the EOC, who viewed Bolanachi as a "foreigner" and believed him to be unfit to represent Egypt at the IOC. King Fuad even called for his resignation and the dissolution of the EOC during the organisation of the African Games. Despite this, Bolanachi continued to be ambitious about hosting an Olympic event within Egypt, proposing both Mediterranean Games and the 1936 Summer Olympics to be held in Alexandria at the 1928 IOC Session in Amsterdam.

However, resentment of Bolanachi grew, fueled by Egypt's poor performances in the 1920, 1924, and 1928 Summer Olympics. The Egyptian press blamed Bolanachi's Greek ethnicity as the reason behind Egypt's troubles during these Games, calling him incapable of guiding Egyptian athletes because he is not Egyptian himself. The EOC did not send athletes to the 1932 Summer Olympics due to a stand-off as a result of Bolanachi continuing to represent the nation at the IOC. Bolanachi wanted to remain the sole Egyptian IOC representative, which the IOC allowed and supported, even with growing movements to nationalise the sports federations of Egypt. In 1932, a new policy was published and spread that the IOC Member from Egypt should be Egyptian, with support from sporting organizations across the nation, effectively a motion of no confidence against Bolanachi. In an attempt to appease the Egyptian public, Bolanachi suggested the appointment of Hussein Sabri Pasha to serve alongside Bolanachi at the 1932 IOC Session in Los Angeles, however Hussein Sabri opposed serving alongside him. After many years calling for his resignation, Bolanachi officially stepped down on 21 November 1932.

=== IOC member for Greece (1933–1963) ===
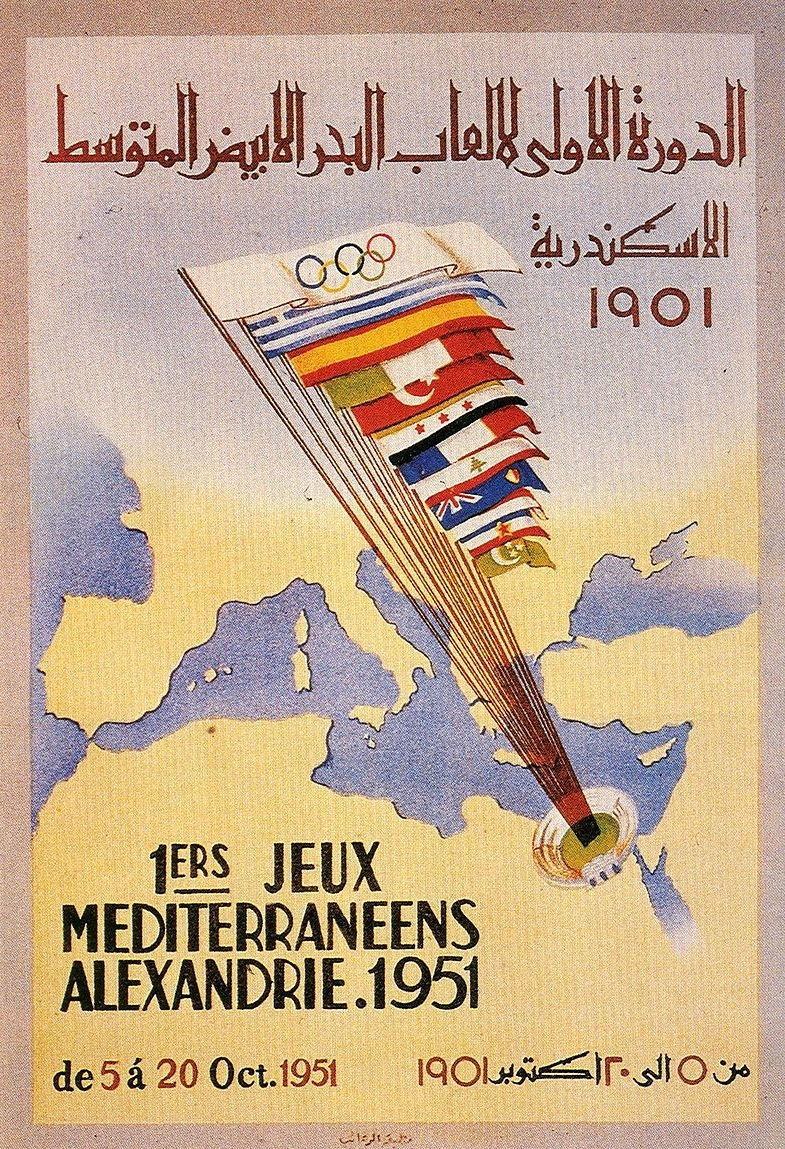
Poster for the 1951 Mediterranean Games, which Bolanachi helped organise

Two days later, Bolanachi announced his willingness to represent Greece in the IOC, with the current Greek member, Nikolas Politis, willing to step down. On 8 June 1933, Bolanachi was sworn in as the IOC member for Greece, which allowed him to serve in the IOC for the rest of his life.

==== Later life and death ====
Following the retirement of Clarence von Rosen of Sweden in 1948, Bolanachi became the doyen of the IOC. The following year, he was the 18th recipient of the Olympic Diploma of Merit. Starting on 25 October 1950, Bolanachi served as the chair of a commission to determine the future of art competitions at the Summer Olympics, with Bolanachi in favor of keeping art contests. While Bolanachi was successful in convinving the delegates at the 1951 IOC session to restore art contests, the decision came too late for contests to occur at the 1952 Summer Olympics. Bolanachi also worked to secure hosting rights for Alexandria for both the 1951 Mediterranean Games, and for the 1953 Arab Games, along with Egyptian IOC member Muhammed Taher Pasha.

Despite the aggressive circumstances in which he was removed from the organisation, the EOC honoured Bolanachi with an award of merit for his role in the development of sport in Egypt in 1955. In 1958, (Note: Wacker set the year at 1958, however Buchanan & Lyberg published the year 1960 as when Bolanachi transferred the items.) Bolanachi donated his collection of sports memorabilia to the Olympic Museum in Lausanne, which included the original Olympic flag that flew in 1914. On 26 July 1963, Bolanachi died in Lausanne, Switzerland, a few days after arriving for his annual vacation. To date, his tenure of 52 years and 214 days in the IOC is the longest service time of any IOC member.
