= Olympic Diploma of Merit =

Awarded by the International Olympic Committee

The Olympic Diploma of Merit was an award given by the International Olympic Committee (IOC) to recognise outstanding services to sports or a notable contribution to the Olympic Games. By 1974, the last time the awards were granted, just 58 people had received the award.

== History ==
Pierre de Coubertin, the originator of the modern Olympic Games, created the honour during the Brussels Olympic Congress of 1905 for those who had made outstanding services to sports or to those who had a major contribution in promoting the Olympic ideals. Strangely, at the 1908 Summer Olympics in London, where red, blue and yellow vouchers were exchanged by the first three athletes for gold, silver and bronze medals respectively, a non-winning competitor's blue voucher could be exchanged for a 'Diploma of Merit' (equivalent of the Olympic Diploma). Sports people who have won the award include Englishman Jack Beresford, winner of medals at five successive Olympics, Dane Ivan Osiier who took part in seven Olympic Games over 28 years, missing the 1936 Games as a protest against Nazism and Frenchman Jean Borotra, Olympic bronze medallist in the Men's Doubles in 1924, winner of four different tennis Grand Slam titles and founder of the International Fair Play Committee.

Sports administrators and promoters who have received the award include Sir Herbert Macdonald, four-time team manager for the Jamaican Olympic Team, and Sir Stanley Rous, former Secretary of The Football Association and the 6th President of FIFA (and one of the last three winners along with Jean Borotra). The award has also gone to those working in the arts: architect Kenzō Tange received the award for his design of the Japanese National Gymnasium for the 1964 Olympics, and film director Kon Ichikawa received one for his celebrated, athlete-focused 1965 documentary film Tokyo Olympiad ((Tōkyō Orinpikku)).

The IOC discontinued the Olympic Diploma of Merit, and three other awards, at the 75th IOC session in 1974. The two extant awards are the Olympic Order, created in 1975 for distinguished contributions to the Olympic movement, and the Olympic Cup, instituted in 1906 by Coubertin for organisations with a record of support for the Olympics and presented annually.

== List of recipients ==
A listing of all 57 recipients:

No.	Recipient	Country
1	President Theodore Roosevelt	United States
2	Fridjhof Nansen	Norway
3	Santos Dumont	Brazil
4	Lord Desborough	United Kingdom
5	The Duke of the Abruzzis	Italy
6	Commandant Lancrenon	France
7	Count Zeppelin	Germany
8	Colonel Balck	Sweden
9	Dr. Jean Charcot	France
10	George Chavez	Peru
11	H. M. King Alphonso XIII	Spain
12	H. H. Crown Prince of Germany	Germany
13	Alain Gerbault	France
14	Colonel Charles Lindbergh	United States
15	Captain Harry Pidgeon	United States
16	Mr Hostin	France
17	Leni Riefenstahl	Germany
18	Angelos Bolanaki	Greece
19	Dr. Paul Martin	Switzerland
20	Jack Beresford	United Kingdom
21	Dr. Ivan Osiier	Denmark
22	Guatemalan Olympic Committee	Guatemala
23	Enfants de Neptune de Tourcoing	France
24	Dr. Francis-Marius Messerli	Switzerland
25	Bill Henry	United States
26	Harry Neville Amos	New Zealand
27	Alfréd Hajós	Hungary
28	Jeanette Altwegg	United Kingdom
29	Charles Denis	France
30	Colonel Marco Perez Jimenez	Venezuela
31	Dr. Carl Diem	Germany
32	Antoine Hafner	Switzerland
33	The Rt. Hon. R. G. Menzies	Australia
34	Otto Mayer, Chancellor of the IOC	Switzerland
35	Maurice Genevoix	France
36	Nikolai Romanov	USSR
37	H. R. H. Prince Axel	Denmark
38	Victor Boin	Belgium
39	Rudolf Hagelstange	Germany
40	Kenzo Tange	Japan
41	Burhan Felek	Turkey
42	Joseph Barthel	Luxembourg
43	Joseph A. Gruss	Czechoslovakia
44	Antonio Elola	Spain
45	Kon Ichikawa	Japan
46	Sir Herbert McDonald	Jamaica
47	Vernon Morgan	United Kingdom
48	Francisco José Nobre Guedes	Portugal
49	Jean-Francois Brisson	France
50	Gaston Meyer	France
51	Andres Merce Varela	Spain
52	Frederick Ruegsegger	United States
53	Epaminondas Petralias	Greece
54	Otl Aicher	Germany
55	Sir Stanley Rous	United Kingdom
56	The Rt. Hon. Lord Philip Noel-Baker	United Kingdom
57	Jean Borotra	France

== See also ==
- Olympic Cup
- Olympic diploma
- Olympic Laurel
- Olympic medal
- Olympic Order
- Pierre de Coubertin Medal
