= Egyptian Olympic Committee =

National Olympic Committee

- Country: Egypt
- Code: EGY
- Created: 1910 in the Khedivate of Egypt
- Recognized: 1910
- Continental Association: ANOCA
- Headquarters: Cairo, Egypt
- President: Hesham Mohamed Tawfeq Hatab
- Secretary General: Alaa Gabr
- Website: www.egyptianolympic.org

The Egyptian Olympic Committee (Arabic: اللجنة الأولمبية المصرية, abbreviated as EOC) is a non-profit organization serving as the National Olympic Committee of Egypt and a part of the International Olympic Committee.

== History ==
The Egyptian Olympic Committee was founded during the Khedivate of Egypt on June 13, 1910 in Alexandria by Angelo Bolanaki, first Egyptian athlete who participated in international sport competitions outside country. Egypt's first ever Olympic participation came in the 1912 Stockholm Olympic Games with one athlete in fencing, Ahmed Hassanein. Egypt was the 14th country to join the IOC.

== List of presidents ==
The following is a list of presidents of the Egyptian Olympic Committee since its creation in 1910.

President	Term
Prince Omar Toussoun	1910–1934
Prince Muhammad Abdel Moneim	1934–1938
Prince Ismail Daoud	1938–1946
Muhammed Taher Pasha	1946–1954
Abdel Rahman Amin	1954–1960
Hussein el-Shafei	1960–1962
Muhammad Talaat Khayri	1962–1967
Safei El Din Abou El Ezz	1967–1971
Mostafa Kamal Tolba	1971–1972
Abdel Moneim Wahby	1972–1974
Mohamed Ahmed Mohamed	1974–1978
Abdel Azim Ashry	1978–1985
Abdel Karim Darwish	1985–1990
Mounir Saleh Sabet	1990–1993
Gamal El Din Moukhtar	1993–1996
Mounir Saleh Sabet	1996–2009
Mahmoud Ahmad Ali	2009–2013
Khaled Zein Eldin	2013–2015
Hesham Mohamed Tawfeq Hatab	2015–2024
Yasser Idris	2024–present

== IOC members ==
Member	Term
Angelo Bolanaki	1910–1932
Muhammed Taher Pasha	1934–1968
Ahmed El Demerdash Touny	1960–1997
Rania Elwani	2004–2012
Mounir Sabet	1998–2017
Aya Medany	2024–present

== Executive committee ==
- President: Yasser Idris
- First Vice President: Mohamed Mostafa Ali
- Second Vice President: Ismail Mohamed Shaker
- Secretary General: Hazem Hosny
- Assistant Secretary General: Mohamed Motie Fakhr Eldin
- Treasurer: Sherif Mahdy El Kamaty
- IOC Member: Aya Mahmoud Madany
- Members: Mohamed Abdel Aziz Ghonim, Sharif Al Arian, Mohamed Abdel Maksoud, Magdy Ellozy, Ashraf Farhat, Ashraf Helmy, Mohamed Mahmoud, Ahmed Kamel, Amna Trabelsi, Tarek Said Ibrahim

== Member federations ==
The Egyptian National Federations are the organizations that coordinate all aspects of their individual sports. They are responsible for training, competition and development of their sports. There are currently 29 Olympic Summer Sport Federations in Egypt.

National Federation	Summer or Winter	Headquarters
Egyptian Archery Federation	Summer	Nasr City, Cairo
Egyptian Athletic Federation	Summer	Nasr City, Cairo
Egyptian Badminton Federation	Summer	Nasr City, Cairo
Egyptian Basketball Federation	Summer	Nasr City, Cairo
Egyptian Boxing Federation	Summer	Cairo
Egyptian Canoe-Kayak Federation	Summer	Cairo
Egyptian Cycling Federation	Summer	Nasr City, Cairo
Egyptian Equestrian Federation	Summer	Nasr City, Cairo
Egyptian Fencing Federation	Summer	Nasr City, Cairo
Egyptian Football Association	Summer	Cairo
Egyptian Golf Federation	Summer	New Maadi, Cairo
Egyptian Gymnastics Federation	Summer	Nasr City, Cairo
Egyptian Handball Federation	Summer	Nasr City, Cairo
Egyptian Hockey Federation	Summer	Nasr City, Cairo
Egyptian Judo, Aïkido and Sumo Federation	Summer	Nasr City, Cairo
Egypt Karate Federation	Summer	Cairo
Egyptian Modern Pentathlon Federation	Summer	Nasr City, Cairo
Egyptian Rowing Federation	Summer	Nasr City, Cairo
Egyptian Sailing and Water - Ski Federation	Summer	El Manial, Cairo
Egyptian Shooting Federation	Summer	Nasr City, Cairo
Egyptian Swimming Federation	Summer	Nasr City, Cairo
Egyptian Table Tennis Federation	Summer	Cairo
Egyptian Taekwondo Federation	Summer	Nasr City, Cairo
Egyptian Tennis Federation	Summer	Cairo
Egyptian Triathlon Federation	Summer	Nasr City, Cairo
Egyptian Volleyball Federation	Summer	Nasr City, Cairo
Egyptian Weightlifting Federation	Summer	Cairo
Egyptian Wrestling Federation	Summer	Nasr City, Cairo

== Controversy ==
At the 2016 Summer Olympics, Egyptian judoka Islam El Shahaby refused to shake the hand of Israeli judoka Or Sasson, who had defeated El Shahaby. In August 2016, the Disciplinary Committee of the International Olympic Committee issued a "severe reprimand" to El Shehaby for behavior violating "the rules of fair play and against the spirit of friendship embodied in the Olympic Values", and requested that the Egyptian Olympic Committee in the future make certain that all Egyptian athletes are properly educated as to the Olympic Values before they participate in the Olympic Games.

== See also ==
- Egypt at the Olympics
- Egypt at the Mediterranean Games
- Egypt at the African Games
- Egypt at the Pan Arab Games
