= Olympic Cup =

Annual award for developing the Olympic movement

The Olympic Cup.

The Olympic Cup (French: Coupe olympique) is an award given annually by the International Olympic Committee.

It was instituted by Pierre de Coubertin in 1906 and is awarded to an institution or association with a record of merit and integrity in actively developing the Olympic Movement.

Its recipients have included amateur sports clubs, schools, newspapers and national sporting administrations, though it is primarily awarded to groups connected with the organization of the Olympic Games.

== Recipients of the Olympic Cup ==
- 1906 — Touring Club de France
- 1907 — Henley Royal Regatta
- 1908 — Swedish Central Association for the Promotion of Sports
- 1909 — German Gymnastics
- 1910 — The Sokol movement
- 1911 — Touring Club Italiano
- 1912 — Union of Gymnastics Societies of France
- 1913 — Hungarian Athletic Club
- 1914 — Amateur Athletic Union of America
- 1915 — Rugby School
- 1916 — Confrérie Saint-Michel de Gand
- 1917 — Dutch Football Association
- 1918 — Sports Teams of the Allied Front
- 1919 — Olympic Institute of Lausanne
- 1920 — Y.M.C.A. International College, Springfield
- 1921 — Danish Sports Federation
- 1922 — Amateur Athletic Union of Canada
- 1923 — Sports Association of Catalonia
- 1924 — Athletic and Gymnastic Federation of Finland
- 1925 — National Physical Education Committee of Uruguay
- 1926 — Norwegian Skiing Federation
- 1927 — Colonel Robert M. Thomson
- 1928 — Junta Nacional Mexicana
- 1929 — YMCA World Committee
- 1930 — Swiss Football and Athletic Association
- 1931 — National Playing Fields Association, Great Britain
- 1932 — German College of Physical Education
- 1933 — Swiss Federal Society of Gymnastics
- 1934 — Opera Nazionale Dopolavoro
- 1935 — National Recreation and Park Association
- 1936 — Hellenic Amateur Athletic Association
- 1937 — Austrian Skating Union
- 1938 — Royal Academy of Physical Education of Hungary
- 1939 — Strength through Joy
- 1940 — Swedish Gymnastics
- 1941 — Finnish Olympic Committee
- 1942 — William May Garland
- 1943 — Argentine Olympic Committee
- 1944 — City of Lausanne
- 1945 — Norwegian Athletics Association
- 1946 — Olympic Committee of Colombia
- 1947 — J. Sigfrid Edström, President of the IOC
- 1948 — Central Council of Physical Recreation
- 1949 — Fluminense Football Club
- 1950 — Belgian Olympic Committee
- 1950 — New Zealand Olympic and British Empire Games Association
- 1951 — Académie des Sports, Paris
- 1952 — City of Oslo
- 1953 — City of Helsinki
- 1954 — Federal School of Gymnastics and Sports of Switzerland
- 1955 — Organizing Committee of the 1954 Central American and Caribbean Games
- 1955 — Organizing Committee of the 1955 Pan American Games
- 1956 — No award
- 1957 — Silent Sports Federation of Italy
- 1958 — No award
- 1959 — Panathlon Italiano, Genoa
- 1960 — Italian University Sports Centre
- 1961 — Helms Athletic Foundation, Los Angeles
- 1962 — Organizing Committee of the 1961 Bolivarian Games
- 1963 — Australian British Empire and Commonwealth Games Association
- 1964 — Southern Californian Committee for the Olympic Games, Los Angeles
- 1965 — City of Tokyo
- 1966 — International Committee of Silent Sports
- 1967 — Bolivarian Games
- 1968 — People of Mexico City
- 1969 — Polish Olympic Committee
- 1970 — Organizing Committee of the 1966 and 1970 Asian Games
- 1971 — Organizing Committee of the 1971 Pan American Games
- 1972 — Turkish Olympic Committee
- 1972 — City of Sapporo
- 1973 — People of Munich
- 1974 — Bulgarian Olympic Committee
- 1975 — Italian National Olympic Committee
- 1976 — Czechoslovak Physical Culture and Sports Federation
- 1977 — Olympic Committee of Ivory Coast
- 1978 — Hellenic Olympic Committee
- 1979 — Organizing Committee of the 1978 World Rowing Championships in New Zealand
- 1980 — Ginásio Clube Portugues
- 1981 — Swiss Confederation, International Olympic Academy
- 1982 — Racing Club de France
- 1983 — Puerto Rico Olympic Committee
- 1984 — Organizing Committee of the 1983 World Championships in Athletics
- 1985 — Chinese Olympic Committee
- 1986 — City of Stuttgart
- 1988 — L'Équipe
- 1988 — People of Australia
- 1989 — City of Seoul
- 1989 — La Gazzetta dello Sport
- 1990 — Panellinios Athletic Club in Athens
- 1991 — Japanese Olympic Committee
- 1992 — Department of Savoie
- 1992 — City of Barcelona
- 1993 — Monégasque Olympic Committee
- 1994 — French National Olympic and Sports Committee
- 1994 — People of Norway
- 1995 — Korean Sport & Olympic Committee
- 1996 — City of Baden-Baden
- 1997 — No award
- 1998 — People of Nagano
- 1999 — United Nations Organization
- 2000 — City of Sydney
- 2001 — Kip Keino School, Eldoret
- 2002 — People of Salt Lake City
- 2003 — Team Alinghi
- 2004 — People of Athens
- 2005 — Lake Placid Winter Olympic Museum
- 2006 — People of Turin
- 2007 — Lake Placid Winter Olympic Museum
- 2008 — The citizens of Beijing
- 2009 —
- 2010 — People of Singapore
- 2011 — South African Sports Confederation and Olympic Committee and the people of Durban
- 2012 — The citizens of London
- 2016 — People of the city of Rio de Janeiro
- 2018 — People of the city of Buenos Aires
- 2022 — People of the People's Republic of China
- 2024 — People of France

== See also ==
- Olympic diploma
- Olympic Diploma of Merit
- Olympic Laurel
- Olympic medal
- Olympic Order
- Pierre de Coubertin medal
