= Fernando Álvarez (sailor) =

Spanish adaptive sailor (born 1973)

Personal information
- Full name: Fernando Álvarez Ortiz de Urbina
- Nationality: Spanish
- Born: 17 November 1973 (age 52) Madrid, Spain

Sport
- Country: Spain
- Sport: Sailing

Fernando Álvarez Ortiz de Urbina (born 17 November 1973) is a Spanish adaptive sailor who has represented Spain at the 2012 Summer Paralympics where he came away with a Paralympic diploma.

== Personal ==
Álvarez is a member of Fundación También. In March 2011, he was part of a delegation who went to the Zarzuela Palace and were received by Felipe de Marichalar y Borbón and Letizia, Princess of Asturias. It was part of a wider program aimed at integration of people with disabilities in Spanish society through sports.

== Sailing ==
Ortiz encouraged Carolina Lopez Rodriguez to take up sailing more seriously. The pair were not confident they would qualify for London but decided to take part in qualifying tests anyway and were pleasantly surprised to qualify for the Games. He was a member of the 2011 Spanish adaptive sailing team in the Skud 18 class event. He qualified for the London Games by September 2011. That month, he competed in the Spanish 2.4mR Cup. He left for London from Madrid in late August. He competed at the 2012 Summer Paralympics in the Mixed Two Person SKUD18 event, where he did not medal. In two sessions, the pair finished in seventh place. The pair earned a Paralympic diploma. It was the best performance ever by Spanish sailors. In December 2012, they were recognised for their elite sportsmenship by the Union of Sports Federations Madrid.
