= Alvin Marriott =

Jamaican sculptor (1902–1992)

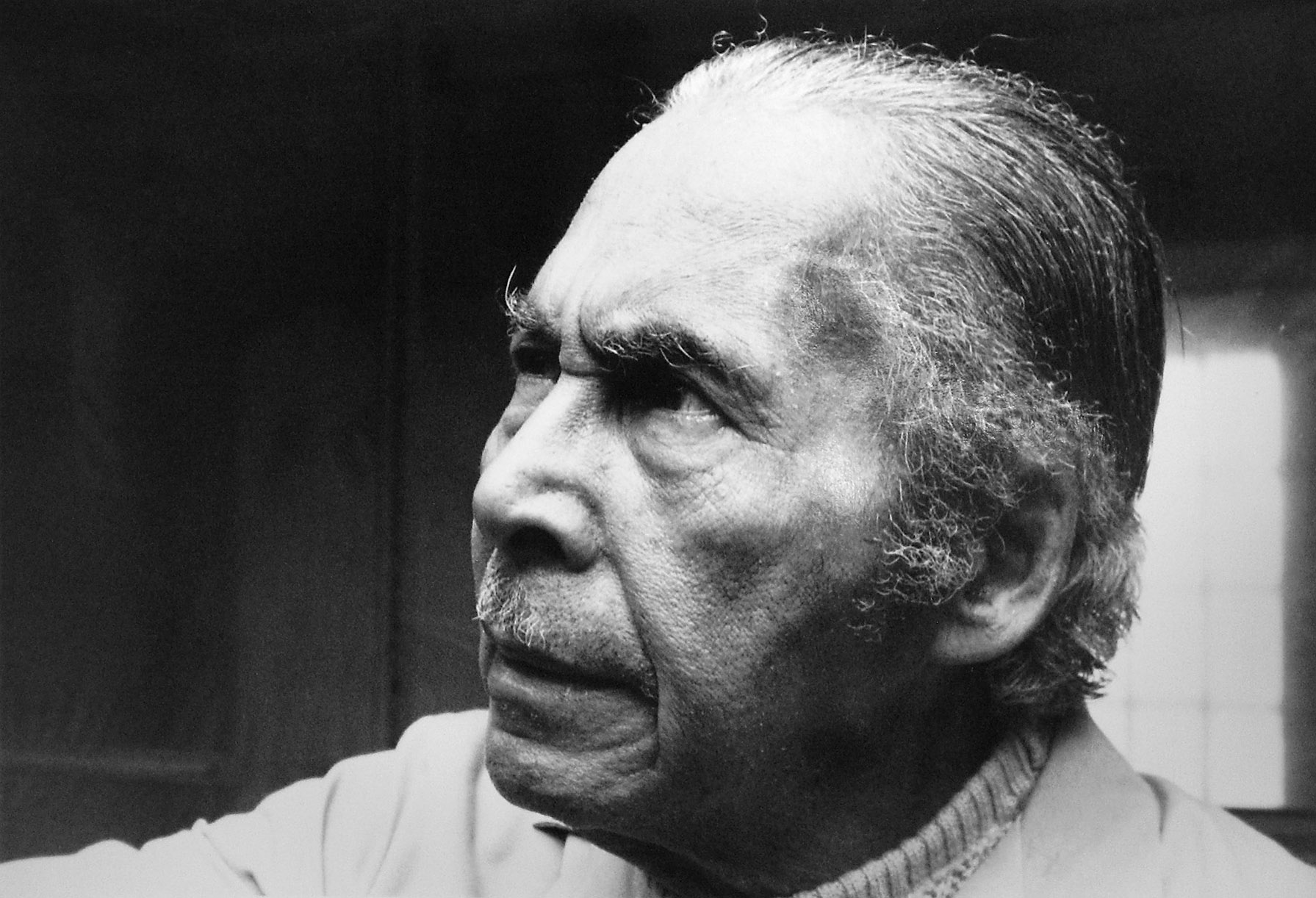
- Alvin Marriott sculpting in London, 1984.
- Born: Alvin Tolman Marriott; 29 December 1902; St Andrew, Colony of Jamaica, British Empire
- Died: 20 September 1992 (aged 89); Miami, Florida, U.S.
- Education: Camberwell School of Arts and Crafts

Alvin Tolman Marriott (29 December 1902 – 20 September 1992) was a Jamaican sculptor. He worked in Europe and North America, including Jamaica and Central America. Many of his carvings and statues are on public display and in administrative buildings in Jamaica and the United Kingdom.

== Early life ==
Marriott was born in Essex Hall, St Andrew, Jamaica in 1902, to Emily and Robert Marriott. His mother was a playwright and musician and his father a farmer and maker of straw goods. In 1913 his parents moved to Port Antonio, better for sales of his father's straw hats to visitors. Marriott's artistic talent was evident at Titchfield School and he began sculpting with local limestone.

== Kingston, Panama, the USA and Europe ==
After his father died in 1923, his family moved to the capital, Kingston. As the oldest of four siblings, Marriott sold his creations to help family finances, including busts of famous people such as King George V and Governor Richards. He married a schoolfriend, Beatrice Black, in 1928. They went on to have eight children. From 1930, he worked as a furniture maker and carver and won a number of prizes. He gained travel experience, going to Panama to do carpentry in 1940 and then to the US in 1944 as a farmworker, where his artistic skills were celebrated locally and he did a bust of president Franklin D. Roosevelt. He received a scholarship from the British Council in 1947 to enrol at Camberwell School of Arts and Crafts in London for his first-ever formal artistic training. He was retained as a lecturer the following academic year. He then began work on carvings for the restoration of the UK Houses of Parliament to replace the wartime bomb damage. He also carved for different furniture makers.

== Later work for Jamaica ==
In 1951 he returned to Jamaica and produced carvings for the University of the West Indies. He created Jamaica's coronation gift for Queen Elizabeth II, a carved wooden tray. He taught at the Jamaica School of Arts and Crafts (1955–61). He left for England to sculpt the statue "Athlete" based on Jamaica's first Olympic gold medallist, Arthur Wint. It stands at the National Stadium and was unveiled by Princess Margaret in 1962 for the Central American and Caribbean Games. He was employed as the chief of architectural embellishments for builder A.D. Scott Ltd. He completed busts of the Jamaican National Heroes Prime Minister Sir Alexander Bustamante, pan-Africanist Marcus Garvey and Premier Norman Manley, as well as Governor-General Sir Clifford Campbell and leading supporter of Jamaican sports Sir Herbert Macdonald.

== Honours and awards ==
In 1967 he received the Jamaica Badge of Honour in the Queen's Birthday Honours List. In 1969 he became Jamaica's first Artist of the Year. He was awarded a Gold Musgrave Medal by the Institute of Jamaica in 1970.

== Final major commission ==
The Jamaican Government commissioned him to sculpt a statue of the recently deceased reggae star Bob Marley in 1984, after uproar over the abstract first monument. He travelled once more to the UK to work on the project in Vauxhall, south London. By this time he was already suffering from Parkinson's disease. The statue now stands in Celebrity Park, Kingston.

Marriott died in Miami, Florida, US, on 20 September 1992.
