= Mounir Sabet =

Egyptian general and sports official (1936–2024)

- منير ثابت

President, Egyptian Olympic Committee
- In office 1990–1993

President, Egyptian Olympic Committee
- In office 1996–2009

President, African Shooting Confederation
- In office 1991–2013

IOC Member
- In office 1998–2016

IOC Honorary Member
- Incumbent
- Assumed office 2017

Personal details
- Born: October 29, 1936 Qena, Upper Egypt, Egypt
- Died: March 3, 2024 (aged 87)
- Parent(s): Saleh Sabet (father), Lily May Palmer (mother)
- Relatives: Suzanne Mubarak (sister)
- Education: Egyptian Air College
- Occupation: Military general; sports administrator

Military service
- Rank: General (Air Force)

Mounir Sabet (more properly spelled Mounir Thabet) (Arabic: منير ثابت; 29 October 1936 – 3 March 2024) was an Egyptian general and sports official.

== Biography ==
Born on 29 October 1936 in the Upper Egyptian city of Qena, Mounir Sabet was the son of Saleh Sabet, an Egyptian pediatrician, and his Welsh wife Lily May Palmer. Mounir Sabet's sister Suzanne was the wife of former Egyptian President Hosni Mubarak, thus the former First Lady of Egypt.

Mounir Sabet was a member of the 1965 Egyptian national shooting team. He served as president of the Egyptian Olympic Committee from 1990 to 1993, and again from 1996 to 2009. He was a member of the International Olympic Committee from 1998 to 2016 and became an Honorary Member in 2017.

Sabet died on 3 March 2024, at the age of 87.

== See also ==
- List of members of the International Olympic Committee

Sporting positions
Preceded by Abdel Karim Darwish	President of the Egyptian Olympic Committee; 1990–1993	Succeeded by Gamal ed-Din Mukhtar
Preceded by Gamal ed-Din Mukhtar	President of the Egyptian Olympic Committee; 1996–2009	Succeeded by Mahmoud Ahmad Ali
