= Wolmer's Schools =

Group of schools in Jamaica

Wolmer's Group of Schools
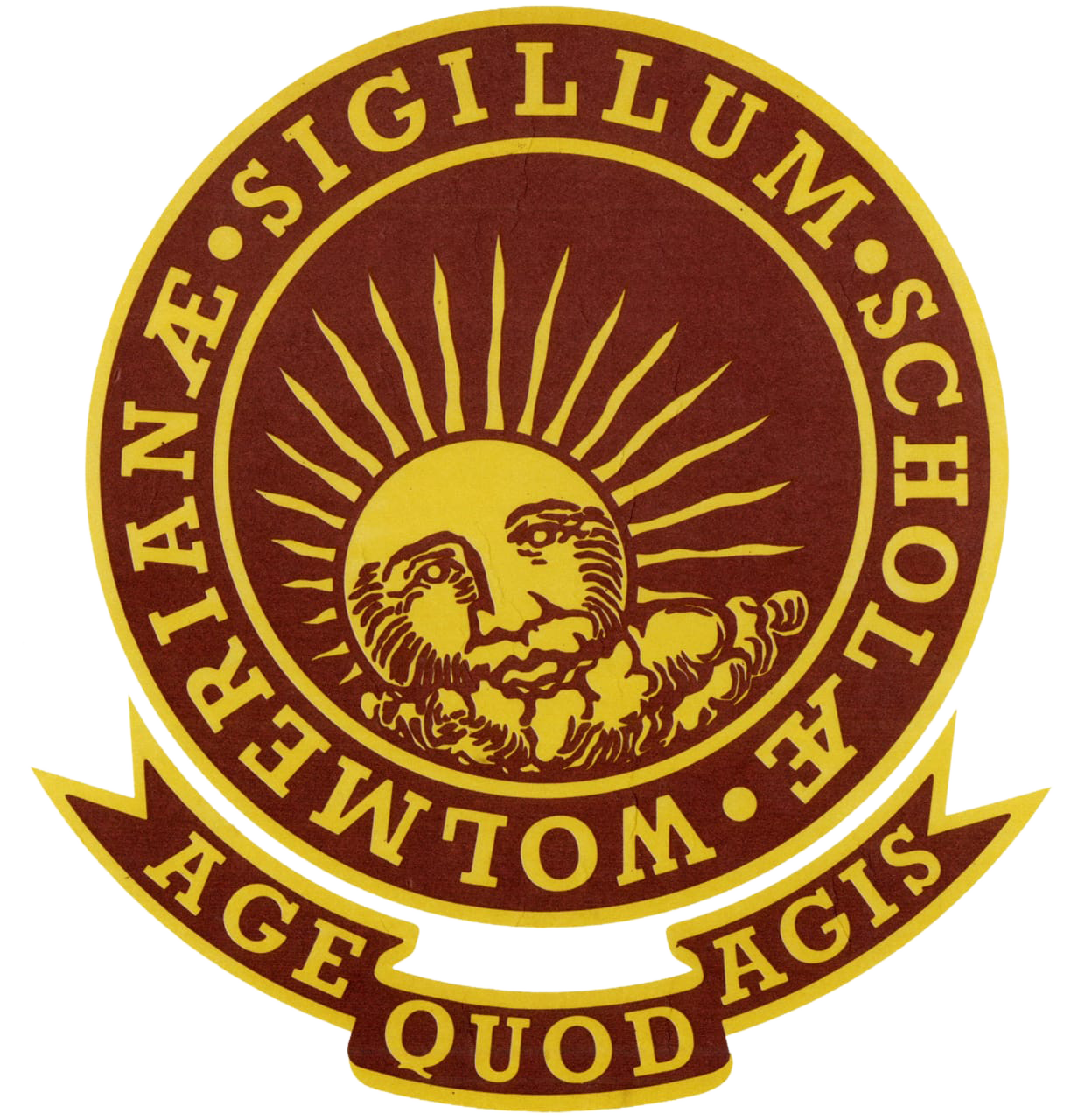

Location
- National Heroes Circle; Kingston 4 Jamaica; 17.9861°N 76.7866°W

Information
- School type: Secondary school and Preparatory School
- Motto: Age Quod Agis
- Founded: 1729; 297 years ago
- Founder: John Wolmer
- Status: Open
- School code: 01042/01043
- Principal: Mr. Dwight Pennycooke (Wolmer's Boys' School); Mrs. Colleen Montague (Wolmer's Girls' School); Ms. Kemar Christie (Wolmer's Prep School)
- Grades: Kindergarten to 13
- Gender: Boys/Girls/[Separated]
- Age: 3 to 19
- Campus type: Urban
- Colours: Maroon and Gold
- Nickname: 'The Maroons' or 'Maroon-clad Warriors'
- Accreditation: CSEC, CAPE

Wolmer's Schools, also referred to as Wolmer's Trust Group of Schools, is located in Kingston, Jamaica, and currently consists of Wolmer's Pre-School, Wolmer's Preparatory School and two high schools: Wolmer's Trust High School for Boys and Wolmer's Trust High School for Girls. Both high schools are popular choices among Jamaican students taking the Primary Exit Profile (PEP) examinations. While acknowledged as separate institutions, the schools share a school song, crest, and motto, "Age Quod Agis", a Latin phrase that translates as "Whatever you do, do it well". Another English translation is “Whatever you do, do it to the best of your ability”.

Wolmer's Schools closely resemble British schools of the 1950s more than those today, a trend that can be noted of the entire Jamaican schooling system.

== History ==
Wolmer's is the second-oldest high school in the Caribbean, having been established in 1729 by John Wolmer, a goldsmith, who bequeathed £2,360 for the establishment of a Free School. However, it did not come into existence until 1736, when the Wolmer's Trust was set up.

The oldest is Combermere School, in Barbados, originally the Drax Parish School, established in 1695 by the will of Colonel Henry Drax, a son of Sir James Drax, of 1682. The third (by record thus far) being Harrison College in Barbados, formerly Harrison Free School, established in 1733.

Wolmer's is certainly the oldest school in the Caribbean that has retained its original name. It turned into a group of schools, which was completely overhauled during the educational reforms of Governor John Peter Grant, who brought two new schoolmasters over from England.

Wolmer's is the oldest continually operating school in Jamaica.

=== John Wolmer, the great benefactor ===
He was probably born around 1659. He was a Kingston goldsmith. He married Mary Elizabeth Lumbard, a 50-year-old widow, at Half Way Tree in 1705, but she died in 1717. He bought land at Stanton Street adjoining Duckenfield, in 1681 and sold it in 1727. Little else is known about him or his origin. There is speculation that he may have come from Switzerland or England. As a goldsmith and jeweller, he probably benefitted from the gold coming from Africa and mainland America that was worked by the few goldsmiths in Port Royal, hence his wealth. Goldsmiths also helped to regulate the value of foreign currency to the English pound, by buying and selling currency. Goldsmiths also made money by acting as brokers connected to the slave trade and as usurers (moneylenders). There is reference of one Peter Calliard selling Negro slaves to John Wolmer in 1712, who was described as “the Kingston jeweller”. He wrote his will on May 21, 1729 (Founder’s Day) and died in Kingston parish on June 29, 1729. The sum of £2,360 was left for the purpose of the establishment of the “Free School”. He also left in his will £50 to the poor of his parish, granted his slaves their freedom (and his clothing) and left his good friend John Williams, his horse, furniture, a silver quarter and £20.

=== Wolmer's importance in Jamaica’s history ===
When the English captured Jamaica from Spain in 1655, their main focus was in gaining as much wealth as possible in the shortest possible time, from the colony. Buccaneering raids on Spanish settlements and ships and the establishment of sugar plantations worked by imported enslaved African labour, became two of the most significant economic activities in Jamaica. Largely illiterate and uneducated settlers poured into the island seeking their fortune, hoping to return to England as wealthy, respectable citizens. The provision of education for the population was therefore a very low priority. John Wolmer was not the first to bequeath money for the establishment of an educational institution in Jamaica. Philip Vicarry (1676), Thomas Martin (1681) and Sir Nicholas Lawes (1695) all left money for the establishment of free schools in various parts of Jamaica, but those schools did not survive or nothing was done about establishing them. Wolmer's will declared that a 'free school' be established in the parish where he happened to die. His will did not exclude any ethnic group or class of people from entering the school, but simply said that a ‘free school’ be established. It was the early Trustees who, in establishing the Wolmer's Trust, introduced a racial bias and allowed only white children to attend the school initially. Reflecting the prejudices of the time, Jewish children were expected to pay for their education, while African children were not accepted at Wolmer’s until some time later. The school did not begin operation until 1736 because of some 'defects' in John Wolmer’s will. No provision was made for the housing of the school, nor were there any rules or guidelines for its management. It took the intervention of Jamaica’s House of Assembly in 1731, 1734 and 1736 and many amendments, before a law was passed establishing the Wolmer's Trust in 1736. The Kingston Common Council, the forerunner to the Kingston and St. Andrew Corporation (KSAC), was responsible for the maintenance, direction, regulation, administration and management of the school and nominated several members to the Wolmer's Board of management, for over two hundred years.

Wolmer's opened as a grammar school in 1736 with ten boys and one teacher, Mr. Bolton. Subjects taught were Reading, Writing, Mathematics, Latin and Greek. The school fee was six pistoles per year. The school did not do so well in its early years and was even closed briefly between 1755 and 1757. In 1779 a Girls' Division was opened, with Margaret Richardson the first head. In the 19th century the Trustees made efforts to reorganise the school. The restrictions placed on Jewish and Coloured children entering the school were officially removed in 1815. An Infant Division was added and more buildings were constructed on the school property. In 1857, the Infant Division was abolished and in 1867, Wolmer's was changed from a Grammar school to an Elementary school. It remained so until 1894, when the school returned to its high school status. In that year also, the Trustees took the decision to separate the Boys' School from the Girls' School.

=== Past and present locations ===
The Wolmer’s Schools have had several locations in the parish of Kingston. It began in the house of Samuel Turpin on land between Port Royal Street and Harbour Street, in 1736. Turpin had left in his will of 1734 to Wolmer’s the annual rent of his house on that lot of land. The school was called ‘Wolmer’s Free School’ at the time.

In 1742, the Trust bought six lots of land on Duke Street, from Samuel Clarke for £93. Two buildings were constructed for a classroom and lodging for the headmaster and boys on the lot. Mr. John Conron was paid £250 for construction. The school was moved from Harbour Street to the new location at upper Duke Street sometime about 1742. When the headmaster Michael Mill died in 1755, the school was closed for two years, until 1757. The Governor of Jamaica, General Knowles, had the building leased to the government as a storage for public records. It was also used as a courthouse for the county of Surrey, so when classes resumed in 1757, the school was moved to rented premises at Parade and remained there until 1777.

In 1777, Wolmer’s was moved to Church Street when the house of a Mr. Bullock was leased for the sum of £120 per annum, for three years. In 1783, it was bought for £900. The Duke Street property had been sold at a public auction for £800 in 1780. More land was bought in 1794 to the north of the school for £250 and fenced in by a brick wall.

In 1807, the two northernmost lots of land of the school property was sold to the city of Kingston for the construction of a Poor House. Wolmer’s was briefly housed in the Poor House (1811), while extensive repairs were carried out, but the inmates objected. Between October 1811 and August 1812, Wolmer’s occupied the Coke Chapel on East Parade while the school was enlarged. Rent of £85 was paid to Coke Chapel for the time the school was there.

When an earthquake struck Kingston on January 14, 1907, the school suffered major damage but was not destroyed. Minor repairs were carried out and Wolmer’s continued at Church Street between 1907 and 1909. A decision was made to find a more suitable site however, as the school had outgrown that location. In 1908 the lands at Quebec Lodge was acquired to house the Boys’ and Girls’ Schools. Quebec Lodge was the site of the Jamaica Exhibition of 1891, located north of Race Course (later called George VI Memorial Park and now National Heroes Park) and is the present site of Wolmer’s Boys’ School and Wolmer’s Girls’ School. Wolmer’s opened at its present site in January 1909.

Wolmer’s Preparatory School began on September 16, 1941 on the Wolmer’s Girls’ School campus. Mrs. Evelyn Skempton, the principal of Wolmer’s Girls’ School, was responsible for starting it. Initially, it served as a feeder school for young girls moving into the Girls’ School, with boys joining the Preparatory School after 1957. In 1944, it was housed in its own buildingat the corner of Marescaux Road and North Race Course (now National Heroes Circle). The Preparatory School moved to its current location on the ‘Cavaliers’ lands on Connolley Avenue in the 1960s, after a new building was constructed for it, through the donation of Dr. Ludlow Moodie.

=== The School Song – Age Quod Agis ===
It became the official song for the Wolmer’s schools in 1979, during the 250th anniversary celebrations of that year. Wolmerians produced and recorded the song. The words and musical arrangement were done by Phyllis Khan. The production of the recording was done by Norma Brown-Bell, for the Wolmer’s Old Girls’ Association. Mapletoft Poulle and Roy Dickson contributed to the chorus arrangement. The song was arranged and edited by Hazel Lawson- Street and Mapletoft Poulle. Recording of the song was done at Dynamic Sounds Recording, with Vinnette Morrison conducting the Wolmer’s Girls’ School choir. The studio engineer was Neville Hinds. It is sung at all official school events.

=== Symbols, monuments and landmarks ===
Symbols

1) The School Crest: It was created in 1738. William Duncan prepared the seal at a cost of £12. It shows the sun of learning breaking through a cloud of ignorance.

2) The School Motto: Age Quod Agis. Latin phrase meaning “whatever you do, do it to the best of your ability.” The more popular interpretation is “whatever you do, do it well.” The motto is attributed to Mr. William Cowper, who was principal of the Boys’ school between 1901 and 1915.

3) The School Colours: Maroon and Gold.

Monuments

1) The monument to John Wolmer: Made of marble, it hangs on the northern wall within Kingston Parish Church. It was sculpted by John Bacon. It represents a seated figure of Liberty, carved in high relief, holding a medallion on which is represented the crest of the school...On the supporting brackets are scholastic emblems, a quill pen, parchment, scientific instruments and the like. Money for the sculpting of the monument was raised by the holding of a sacred concert in Kingston Parish Church, in 1788. Over £400 was raised from the concert, for this purpose. The proposal to hold a concert originated with a Mr. Falstead, who had composed the oratorio ‘Jonah’ in 1775. The monument was erected in 1790.

2) The Cenotaph: It is a monument dedicated in honour to those Wolmerians who died in World War I (1914 – 1918). The Wolmer’s Old Boys’ and Girls’ Associations (WOBA/WOGA) was instrumental in its construction. It was designed and built under the supervision of Mr. V. Streadwick and unveiled on November 12, 1924. It stands in the quadrangle between both high schools, along National Heroes’ Circle. A plaque on it has inscribed the names of 21 Wolmerians. In the week after Armistice Day (November 11), a ceremony is held there, with the laying of wreaths by representatives from the W.O.B.A and W.O.G.A and present students. It has become the preferred site for the taking of photographs of the various teams and forms at Wolmer’s, over the years. On August 21 and 22, 2014, the cenotaph was moved to its current position near to the main entrance gate, to make space for the school’s auditorium being constructed.

Important landmarks

3) The Mico fence: It forms part of the official border demarking the parish of Kingston from that of St. Andrew.

4) The French Peanut tree: Standing between the playfield and the block of classrooms in front of the Mico fence, the current tree replaces one which fell in 2004. Growing to a height of approximately 45 metres, it produces an edible nut in a tough shell, when mature. The nuts are encased in a pod which opens when ripe, to reveal the nuts. Tiny prickles in the pod produce itching when it makes contact with the skin.

5) Quebec Lodge: The original name for the area which the Wolmer’s Schools currently inhabit. It was the site for the Jamaica Exhibition that was held in Jamaica in 1891. The high schools were relocated to these lands in 1909, after the destruction of the buildings at Church Street, in the 1907 earthquake. Excavations carried out in the area between the Sixth Form Block and the Senior Physics Laboratory in 1991, revealed the foundation of the great water fountain that was once part of the 1891 Exhibition.

6) Old Wolmer’s Yard: The site of the Wolmer’s school between 1783 and 1907 on Church Street, it is situated beside Kingston Parish Church, facing South Parade, in downtown Kingston. It is currently used as a parking lot and a market for street vendors.

=== Headmasters ===
Wolmer's Preparatory School
Principal	Tenure
Mrs. Everlyn Skempton (Founding Principal)	-
Mrs. Duperly	-
Miss Marjorie Fraser	-
Mrs. Campbell	-
Miss Hope Valentine	-
Miss Orane	-
Miss Freda DeMercado	-
Miss J. Mordecai	1960-65
Miss Valerie Packer	1959; 1965–66
Mrs. Patricia Bayston	-
Mrs. H. Daley	-
Mrs. Joyce Tyson	-
Mrs. Hyacinth Bennett	-
Mrs. Tyson	-
Mrs. June Spence	-
Mrs. Lorna Downie	2007-14
Mrs. Weida Saddler	2014-16
Ms. Janet Howard	2016-18
Mrs. Donnette Clarke (Acting)	2018-20
Mrs. Norma McNeil	2020-21
Ms. Kemar Christie	2021-

Wolmer's Boys' School
Principal	Tenure
Mr. Bolton	1738
Rev. WIlliam Alcock	1743
Rev. Dedsbury	1744
Michael Mill	1745
Rev. Isaac Taaf	1757
Samuel Evans	1757
Francis Grant	1759-74
Walter Gibbs	1774
Rev. Dr. Morgan	1777
Rev. Alexander Cummins	1779-89
Thomas Downes	1787
Rev. Robert Stanton Woodham	1789-91
Rev. James Dymoke	1791-99
Rev. David Duff	1799-1803
John. P. Nugent	1803-1812
Bartholomew Owen Williams	1812
Rev. Thomas Pearce Williams	1813
Rev. Ebenezer Red (Snr.)	1815-45
Ebenezer Red (Jnr.)	1845-47
William Augustus Reid	1847-52
Rev. Charles P. Street	1852-55
Solomon Myers	Oct. 1-15, 1855
William Carter	1855-62
Rev. Robert Gordon	1862-67
John Tillman	1868-95
Albert Dews B.A.	1896-1901
William Cowper	1901-15
F.M. Peachell	1915-17
Rev. Symms	1917-19
F.W. Day	1919-20
Reginald Murray	Apr. 1920-1933
Phillip Sherlock	1933-38
Lewis Davidson	1939-42
J.R. Bunting	1943-49
Dr. Simpson	1950-53
Norman Jackson	1953-64
H.N. Walker	1964-66
Donald Bogle	1966-71
Richard Morris	1971-78
Gilbert Smith	1978-79
E. Coleridge Barnett	1979-98
Mrs. DeAnne Robb (Acting)	1998-2000; Sep. 2007 - Apr. 2008
Dave Myrie	2000-07
Dr. Walton Small	2008-19
Mr. Dwight Pennycooke	2019-

Wolmer's Girls' School
Principal	Tenure
Miss Maud Barrows	1896-1904
Miss Kate Howson	1904-27
Miss Mary E. Cowper	1927-40
Mrs. Evelyn Skempton	1941-62
Miss Audrey Pinto	1962-85
Mrs. Pamela Harrison	1985-2003
Mrs. Colleen Montague	2003-

=== Important dates ===
May 21, 1729 – John Wolmer wrote his last will and testament, within which he left money for the founding of a free school in the parish where he should happen to die.

June 29, 1729 – John Wolmer died.

1736 – By an Act of the House of Assembly, a law was passed establishing a Trust for the management of the school, commonly called ‘Wolmer’s Free School’. The first members of the Trust were John Gregory, William Nedham, George Ellis and Rev. Dr. May. Rev. Dr. May started the library with gifts of dictionaries, grammars, Fables, an English Bible and 12 catechisms of the Church of England (Anglican).

1736 – The school opened in the house of Samuel Turpin, (who had left it for the school in his will in 1734), on Harbour and Port Royal Street, with 10 boys and 1 teacher, Mr. Bolton. Wolmer’s began as a Grammar School, with the teaching of Reading, Writing, Latin, Greek and Mathematics.

1742 – The Trust bought 6 vacant lots on Duke Street from Samuel Clarke and moved the school to that location. The first Foundation Scholars, (boys with Wolmer’s Scholarships paid by the Trust), were admitted. They were Peter Quarrell (9), Stephen Reed (12), Michael Luncheon (9), Matthew Croe (8) and Edward Morgan (5). The school body numbered 40 boys.

1755 to 1757 – The school was closed after the death of the Headmaster, Mr. Michael Mill. The Duke Street building was leased to the government, as storage for public records.

1757 – Classes resumed in rented quarters, probably at Parade, up to 1777.

September 1777 – The school was set up at Church Street. It consisted of an infant and grammar division and was known as ‘Wolmer’s Academy’. More land was acquired to the north of the school in 1794.

September 15, 1777 – The Trustees passed a resolution whereby “none but children of white parents be admitted into this school of this corporation”.

1779 – A female division was introduced into the school. The head of this division was Miss Margaret Richardson.

October 1811 to August 1812 – Wolmer’s operated from Coke Chapel, while the school’s property on Church Street was being enlarged.

1815 – The limit placed on the admission of Jewish children was removed. Coloured children were also admitted.

March 3, 1857 – The Infant division of the school was abolished.

August 1, 1862 – Rev. Robert Gordon was appointed as the first black Headmaster of the school.

1867 – Wolmer’s ceased to be a Grammar School, becoming an Elementary School.

1894 – Wolmer’s returned to Grammar (High School) status, upon the recommendation of The Jamaica Schools’ Commission. The Boys’ and Girls’ Divisions were formally divided into 2 distinct schools.

1895 – Both schools opened as secondary schools. The first Headmaster of the new secondary Wolmer’s Boys’ School was Mr. Albert Dews, while the first Headmistress of Wolmer’s Girls’ School was Miss Maud Barrows.

1897 – The decision was made to abolish the lower (Elementary) division at both schools.

1905 – The Wolmer’s Old Boys’ Association was established.

January 12, 1907 – The Great Earthquake did substantial damage to the schools.

1908 – The decision was made to relocate the schools to the Quebec lands.

January 1909 – Wolmer’s occupied its new buildings at Quebec Lodge.

April 20, 1909 – The Wolmer’s Old Girls’ Association was founded “to promote easy intercourse of Old Girls with one another, to help the School in whatever way possible, and to join together in some social work”.

January 1937 – The House System was introduced at the Boys’ School by Philip Sherlock, principal between 1933 and 1938. The original houses were Crosse, Wolfe, Harrison and Patterson.

1939 – The khaki uniform was introduced by Mr. Lewis Davidson, principal between 1939 and 1942.

1941 – The Wolmer’s Parents’ Teachers’ Association was inaugurated by Mr. Davidson.1991 – A fire destroyed the building housing the Principal’s office, assembly hall, prefect’s room, staff room and 2 classrooms.

August 21–22, 2014 – The cenotaph was moved to its current spot to make way for the construction of the school’s auditorium.

September 5, 2014 – An official groundbreaking ceremony was held at the school, marking the start of construction of the school auditorium, after 23 years of being without one.

2019 — Governor-General Sir Patrick Allen declares Wolmer’s Day on May 21, in recognition of “its longevity, … sustained excellence in academics, sports, and creative arts.”

== Staff and structure ==
The Wolmer's Schools are overseen by a joint Board of Management. Wolmer's Preparatory School has its own principal, Kemar Christie). The principal of the boys' school is Dwight Pennycooke, and of the girls' school, Colleen Montague. The boys' and girls' schools are organised into 14 departments, each led by a senior teacher.

=== Clubs & Societies ===
Among its many activities, football, debate, cricket, track and field and tennis stand out.

=== Competitions ===
Various competitions are held at the schools throughout the school year to foster comradery and school spirit. One of the most notable is the Monica Sterling Essay Competition, running throughout the Easter Term. Mrs. Sterling was an English teacher at the school from 1982-1994.

== Curriculum ==
Wolmer’s Boys’ and Girls’ Schools follow the traditional English grammar-school model used throughout the British West Indies, which incorporates the optional year 12 and 13, collectively known as Sixth Form. The first year of secondary school is regarded as first form, or grade seven, and subsequent year groups are numbered in ascending order up to sixth form, or grade twelve and grade thirteen. Students are exposed to the CSEC subject offerings throughout their first-third form years, with a Careers Day session held near the end of their third form year to curate their CSEC programs. The schools over a variety of subject offerings inclusive of the Humanities, Arts, and Sciences, which students pursue throughout their CSEC and CAPE years (fourth-sixth form). Wolmer’s Boys’ has been known for being the only all-boys school to consistently rank in Jamaica’s top ten high schools. The Girls' School is also placed highly in various sources and is considered one of the best all-girls schools in the country.

=== Rhodes Scholars ===
Since 1904, Wolmer's Schools has educated 24 Rhodes Scholars.

== Cricket ==
Wolmer's Boys School has the most wins of the Sunlight Cup for Inter-Scholastic Under 19 Cricket. Moreover, the school continues to produce cricketers that have represented Jamaica and the West Indies Cricket Team. The school is noted in cricket in the West Indies for having produced six test wicket-keepers. The Daily Telegraph once wrote: "One school: six Test wicket-keepers. There has never been any nurturing like it."

== Notable alumni ==
Arts, culture and entertainment

- Cherine Anderson, international recording artiste, actress, President of The Reach One Child R.O.C. Foundation
- Peter Ashbourne, composer
- Maurice Ashley, chess player, author and commentator
- James Aubrey, Austrian-born English actor
- Harry Belafonte, actor and singer, winner of Tony, Emmy, Grammy and Oscar Awards
- Marlon James, novelist
- Diana King, international recording artiste
- Sean Paul, Grammy-winning artiste
- Kei Miller, novelist and poet
- Wayne Marshall, artiste
- Henry Wilcoxon, actor
- Paul Williamson, tenor
- Dahlia Harris, media personality, playwright and actress

Business, finance and politics

- Lloyd Carney, American businessman
- Amy Jacques Garvey, wife of Marcus Mosiah Garvey
- Sir Florizel Glasspole, Governor General of Jamaica 1973–1991
- Keble Munn, former Minister of Agriculture and Minister of National Security
- Patsy Robertson, diplomat, Official Spokesperson for The Commonwealth 1983–1994
- Billy Strachan, RAF pilot, pioneer of black civil rights in Britain, communist, legal expert, newspaper editor
- Edward Seaga, Prime Minister of Jamaica 1980–1989
- Brian Wynter, Governor of the Bank of Jamaica
- Harold Moody, doctor and campaigner for racial equality in Britain
- Kevin Fenton, Public Health England's regional director of public health for London
- Rocky Ricardo Meade, Former Chief of Defence Staff, Permanent Secretary, Office of the Prime Minister

Sports

- Gerry Alexander, cricketer
- Ivan Barrow, cricketer
- Carlton Baugh, cricketer
- Gareth Breese, cricketer
- Patrick Harris, cricketer
- Roy Anthony Bridge, sports administrator and IOC member
- Christoff Bryan, national high-jump record holder
- Jeff Dujon, cricketer
- Ashani Fairclough, footballer
- Julian Forte, track athlete
- Shelly-Ann Fraser-Pryce, track athlete – double Olympic Gold medallist in the 100 m
- Lindel Frater, track athlete
- Michael Frater, track athlete – Olympic Gold Medallist in the 4 × 100 m
- Ricardo Gardner, footballer – English Premier League (Bolton Wanderers)
- Jackie Hendriks, cricketer
- Omar Holness, footballer
- Jaheel Hyde, Olympian
- Peter Isaacs, footballer
- Sir Herbert Macdonald, footballer, tennis player and sports administrator and promoter
- Germaine Mason, Olympian
- Karl Nunes, cricketer
- Patrick Patterson, cricketer
- Allan Rae, cricketer
- Luton Shelton, footballer – record holder for most goals for Jamaica in international football
- Khari Stephenson, footballer
- Paul Young, footballer
