= List of awards received by Charles III =

Before his accession as king, Charles III received numerous awards by various organizations around the world, mostly, for his contributions on the environment including organic farming, gardening, climate change, and architecture.

== Environmental awards ==
Overall

- 2002: EuroNatur Award for Environmental Excellence by the EuroNatur Awards
- 2007: Global Environmental Citizen Award by the Harvard Medical School Center for Health and the Global Environment
- 2008: St. Thomas Aquinas Environmental Award by Tulane University
- 2009: Global Empowerment Award by the Asian Women of Achievement Awards
- 2010: Great Gold Medal by Masaryk University
- 2016: Londoner of the Decade award by The London Evening Standard's Progress 1000 Awards

=== Organic farming and food ===
- 2006: Outstanding Public Expression Award by the OSSA Awards, joint award with the Duchess of Cornwall
- 2007: World Farming Award by Compassion in World Farming
- 2010: National Agricultural Award by the Royal Agricultural Society of England’s (RASE)
- 2012: George Hedley Memorial Award by the National Sheep Association
- 2013: The Royal Smithfield Club Bicentenary Trophy Award by the Smithfield Club
- 2015: Prix Francois Rabelais award by the Institut de France

=== Conservation ===
- 2011: Royal Society for the Protection of Birds Medal by the Royal Society for the Protection of Birds (RSPB)
- 2015: Teddy Roosevelt International Conservation Award by the International Conservation Caucus Foundation (ICCF)

=== Ecology ===
- 2003: World Ecology Award by The International Center for Tropical Ecology at the University of Missouri-St. Louis.
- 2009: German Sustainability Award by the German Sustainability Award organization

=== Gardening ===
- 2001: Silver Medal for Islamic-style show garden by Chelsea Flower Show
- 2009: Victoria Medal of Honour (presented by Queen Elizabeth II) by the Royal Horticultural Society

=== Climate change ===
- 2006: Awareness Award by The British Environment and Media Awards (BEMAs)
- 2009: Friend of the Forest and Climate Award by Conservation International (CI) and the Brazilian state of Amazonas

=== Architecture ===
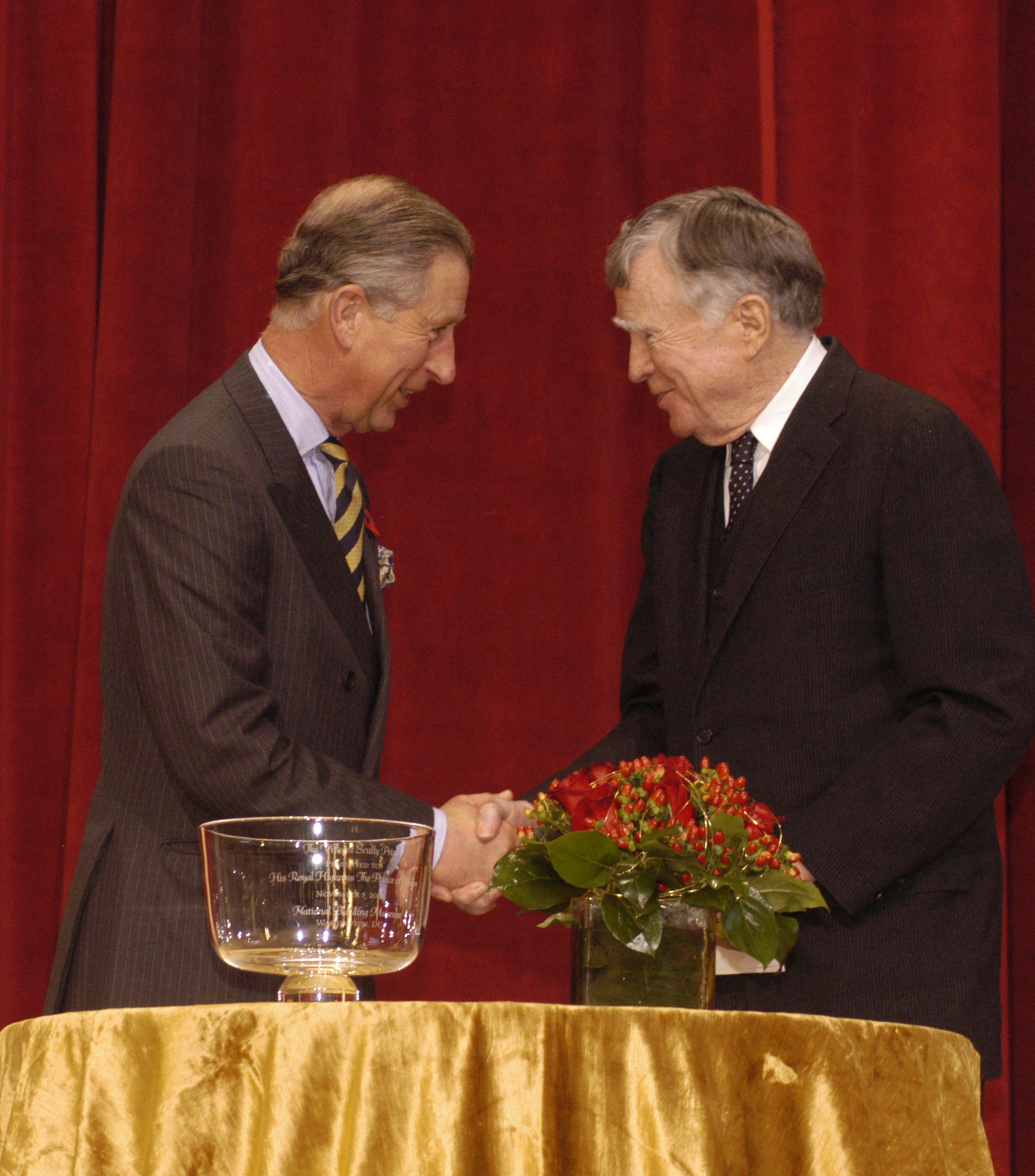
Vincent Scully at the National Building Museum hands over the 2005 Scully Prize to Prince Charles.

- 1991: First Lewis Mumford Award by Architects/Designers/Planners for Social Responsibility organization (ADPSR)
- 2005: Vincent Scully Prize by the National Building Museum
- 2005: International Environmental Arts Award by the International Center for Environmental Arts (ICEA)
- 2008: Congress for the New Urbanism (CNU) Athena Medal Award by the Athena Awards
- 2011: 25th anniversary CEM Property Award by The College of Estate Management
- 2012: The Richard H. Driehaus Prize by the university of Notre Dame School of Architecture
- 2013: Albert Simons Medal of Excellence by the Historic Preservation and Community Planning Program at the College of Charleston School of the Arts

== Art awards ==
=== Contemporary ===
- 2001: City of Florence Prize (20 lithographs of his watercolour paintings illustrating his country estates have been exhibited at The Florence International Biennale Exhibition of Contemporary Art
- 2011: Montblanc de la Culture Arts Patronage Award by the Montblanc Cultural Foundation

== Lifetime achievement awards ==
- 2008: Rainforest Alliance Lifetime Achievement Award by the Rainforest Alliance
- 2011: Special Award for The Promotion of Gardening by the Garden Media Guild
- 2012: Lifetime achievement award by the International Green Awards
- 2018: Editor's Lifetime Achievement Award For Services To Philanthropy by GQ Awards
- 2020: Lifetime Achievement Award for Contributions to Farming by Farmers Weekly
- 2023: 100 most influential people in the world by Time magazine

== See also ==
- List of titles and honours of Charles III
