= Olympic Laurel =

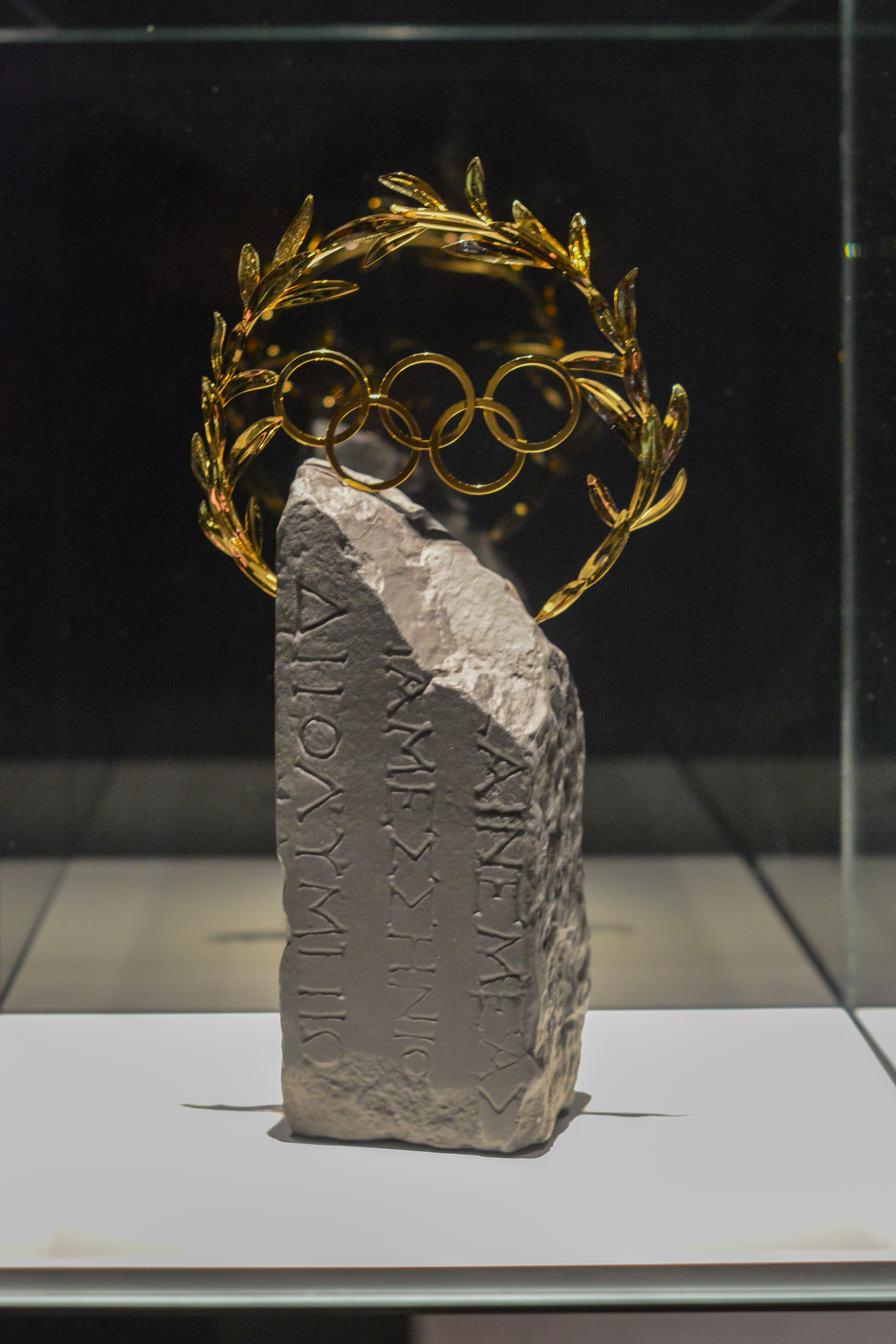
- Awarded for: Significant achievements in education, culture, development and peace through sport
- Presented by: International Olympic Committee
- Status: Currently awarded
- First award: 5 August 2016
- Final award: 26 July 2024

Highlights
- Total recipients: 3

The Olympic Laurel is a distinction awarded by the International Olympic Committee (IOC) to honour those who have "made significant achievements in education, culture, development and peace through sport". It was introduced in 2016 to implement part of recommendation 26 of Olympic Agenda 2020, and will be presented during the opening ceremony of each Olympic Games. IOC President Thomas Bach stated that the award reconnects the Olympics the ideals and values of the Ancient Olympic Games. The trophy features a laurel wreath and the Olympic rings which are made out of Fairmined Gold and the base is a stone from Ancient Olympia.

== List of recipients ==
Year	Name	Reference
2016	(Kenya) Kipchoge Keino	
2020	(Bangladesh) Muhammad Yunus	
2024	(Italy) Filippo Grandi	

== See also ==
- Olympic Cup
- Olympic diploma
- Olympic Diploma of Merit
- Olympic medal
- Olympic Order
- Pierre de Coubertin Medal
