= Independence Park (Jamaica) =

Stadium in Kingston, Jamaica

Coordinates: 18°00′07″N 76°46′18″W

- The Office
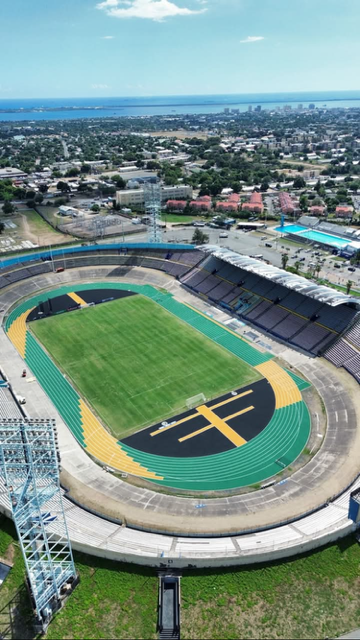
- Interactive map of Independence Park
- Full name: Independence Park
- Location: Kingston, Jamaica
- Capacity: 35,000
- Field size: unknown

Construction
- Built: 1962
- Opened: 1962
- Renovated: 2026–2029 (planned)
- Expanded: 2026–2029 (planned)

Tenant
- Jamaica national football team (1962–present)

Independence Park (often called "The Office") is a sports and cultural complex in Kingston, Jamaica built for the 1966 British Empire and Commonwealth Games. It houses a variety of sports facilities. A statue of Bob Marley marks the entrance to the site. The main sports venue at the complex is the National Stadium, a term which is colloquially used to refer to the entire complex.

== The National Stadium ==
The National Stadium is primarily used for football (being the home field of the Jamaica Football Federation) but is also considered the apex of Athletic competition in the West Indies being home to Jamaica's national athletic team for the Olympic Games and Commonwealth Games.

It was built for the 1962 Central American and Caribbean Games, for which it was the main stadium hosting the opening and closing ceremonies, track and field and cycling events. It was also home to the 1966 British Empire and Commonwealth Games. It holds 35,000 people.

On March 13, 2025, former FC Barcelona player Lionel Messi of Inter Miami CF visited Jamaica for the CONCACAF Champions Cup against Cavalier.

Facilities include:

- a 400m IAAF regulation running track (a warm up track east of the main stadium was recently renovated to create a second world class competition track)
- a 500m concrete velodrome which encircles the running track
- a FIFA regulation football pitch
- a media centre
- 11 private suites and a royal box.

At the entrance to the stadium are statues of various Jamaican sprinters, including Don Quarrie, Merlene Ottey, Herb McKenley and, since December 2017, Usain Bolt. The last three are works by Basil Watson. As early as 1961, a sculpture by Jamaican sculptor Alvin Marriott, called 'The Runner', was unveiled in front of the National Stadium to honor the achievements of Herb McKenley, Leslie Laing, Arthur Wint and George Rhoden.

In June 2026, a design plan was announced for the redevelopment of the stadium, which would feature a 37,500 seat capacity stadium designed to meet FIFA and World Athletics standards, a nine lane athletics track, two fan zones, premium hospitality lounges, and a fan boulevard, and a capacity expansion up to 50,000 people for concerts and major entertainment events.

== The National Aquatic Centre ==
The National Aquatic Centre, also referred to as the Stadium Pool, comprises two Olympic-sized swimming pools, which were built to host the aquatic events of the 1962 Central American and Caribbean Games. The main swimming pool was modified to accommodate the 1966 British Empire and Commonwealth Games which required that distances be in yards as opposed to metres. It currently seats 8,500.

== The National Arena ==
Originally known as the Convention Hall, the National Arena was built to host the wrestling and badminton events of the 1966 British Empire and Commonwealth Games. It holds 6,000 people and was opened in 1963.

It is now used for a wide range of activities including sports tournaments (badminton, netball, table tennis, etc.), trade exhibitions, flower shows, the National Festival song and costume competitions and state funerals. Bob Marley and the Wailers performed there in 1975. The 1982 Youth Consciousness Festival hosted Bunny Wailer, Peter Tosh, and Jimmy Cliff.

== The National Indoor Sports Complex (NISC) ==
The National Indoor Sports Complex was built adjacent to the National Arena to host the 2003 World Netball Championships. It holds 6,000 people and opened in 2002. It also is used to host events such as parties, fashion shows as well as other sports such as basketball.

== Leila Robinson Netball Courts ==
These are outdoor netball courts located in between the basketball courts and Swimming Complex. It is named after Leila Robinson, the first ever netball coach and manager for the Sunshine Girls. It underwent renovations at the end of 2014 into 2015 where the complex, which hosts four netball courts, received a new surface, replacing the outdated rubberized surface as well as new stands, located on the right side of the complex, which now accommodated persons with disabilities. The renovations cost upward of $23 million.

== The Institute of Sports ==
The Institute of Sports (INSPORTS) was established in 1978 by the Government of Jamaica to promote the development of sport at the national level. It is located beside the National Arena. The building houses the Jamaica Table Tennis and Volleyball associations at the bottom floor; Netball Jamaica, Special Olympics and Basketball (JABA) associations on the second floor; and the Institute of Sports on the top floor.

== Stadium Courts ==
These are the outdoor basketball courts located beside the Leila Robinson Netball Courts. The complex hosts two basketball courts with stands to the left of the complex.

== Stadium Concerts ==
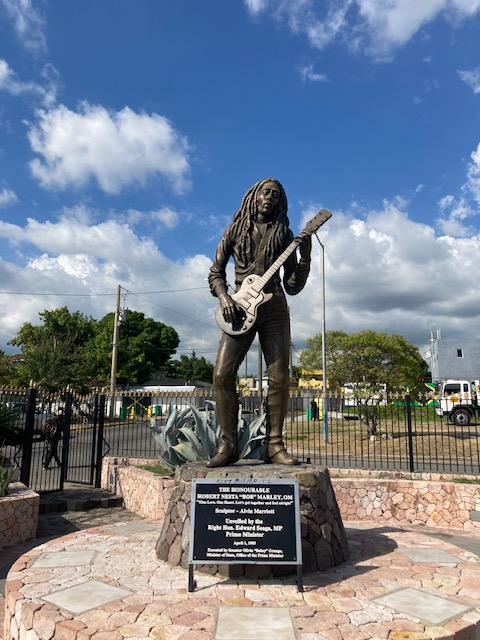
Bob Marley statue outside the National Stadium

Bob Marley's One Love Peace Concert was a large concert held on 22 April 1978 at the national stadium in Kingston, Jamaica.

The One Love Peace Concert brought together 16 of reggae’s Biggest Acts, and was dubbed by the media as a "Third World Woodstock", "Bob Marley Plays For Peace" and simply, "Bob Marley Is Back." The concert attracted more than 32,000 spectators with the proceeds of the Show going toward "Much Needed Sanitary Facilities And Housing For The Sufferahs In West Kinston." The concert kicked off at exactly 5:00 P.M. with a message from Asfa Wossen, The Crown Prince Of Ethiopia, praising the concert organizers’ efforts to restore peace in Jamaica.

In 2022, Nigerian star Burna Boy held the last leg of his Love, Damini tour in the stadium alongside Popcaan. Burna Boy became the first African artist to sell out the stadium with a total of 33,125 attendees grossing over 550,250,420 JMD. The Minister of Tourism, Hon. Edmund Bartlett lauded Nigerian International music star, Burna Boy for a stellar performance that attracted thousands of locals and visitors to the island's capital, Kingston on 18 December 2022

== Bob Marley statue ==
Also located in the sports park is a statue of musician Bob Marley by Alvin Marriott. It was unveiled in 1984 and replaced the Bob Marley statue by the Jamaican sculptor Christopher González at this location, which was controversial due to its slightly abstract design. Gonzalez's work initially remained in the National Gallery of Jamaica in Kingston before being installed in Island Village in Ocho Rios on 21 October 2002.

== Notes and references ==
Preceded by Estadio Olímpico de la UCV; Caracas	Central American and Caribbean Games opening venues 1962	Succeeded by Hiram Bithorn Stadium; San Juan
Preceded by Perry Lakes Stadium; Perth	British Empire and Commonwealth Games opening venues 1966	Succeeded by Meadowbank Stadium; Edinburgh
