= Fernando Luis Alvarez =

American gallery owner and artist

- Born: Greenwich, Connecticut
- Education: Richmond, The American International University in London
- Occupations: Art gallerist, curator
- Years active: 1996–present
- Known for: Founder of Alvarez Gallery; Spoon Movement protest; Clementina Arts Foundation

Fernando Luis Alvarez is an American art gallerist, curator, and arts advocate based in Stamford, Connecticut. He is the founder of Alvarez Gallery, a contemporary art gallery established in 2009. Alvarez gained wider attention for his involvement in public art activism addressing the opioid crisis in the United States, including a widely reported protest installation outside the headquarters of Purdue Pharma in 2018.

== Biography ==
=== Early life and education ===
Alvarez was born in Greenwich, Connecticut. He spent part of his childhood in Colombia before returning to the United States during his youth. He later studied international business at Richmond, The American International University in London

== Career ==
Before entering the art world, Alvarez worked in advertising and marketing. He founded the creative agency APe-Shop, which he later sold before establishing Alvarez Gallery in Stamford, Connecticut in 2009.

In 2009, Alvarez founded Alvarez Gallery in Stamford, Connecticut. The gallery focuses on contemporary art and has presented exhibitions featuring emerging and international artists.

Through the gallery, Alvarez has organized exhibitions, public programs, and artist talks aimed at expanding engagement with contemporary art. The gallery gained wider recognition in 2018 after an activist art installation addressing the opioid epidemic generated national media coverage.

== Curatorial work and exhibitions ==
Through Alvarez Gallery, Alvarez has organized exhibitions featuring emerging and international contemporary artists. The gallery has presented solo and group exhibitions as well as artist talks and cultural programs intended to expand engagement with contemporary art in the region.

Some exhibitions have addressed social and political themes, including projects exploring the opioid crisis in the United States and the role of contemporary art in public discourse.

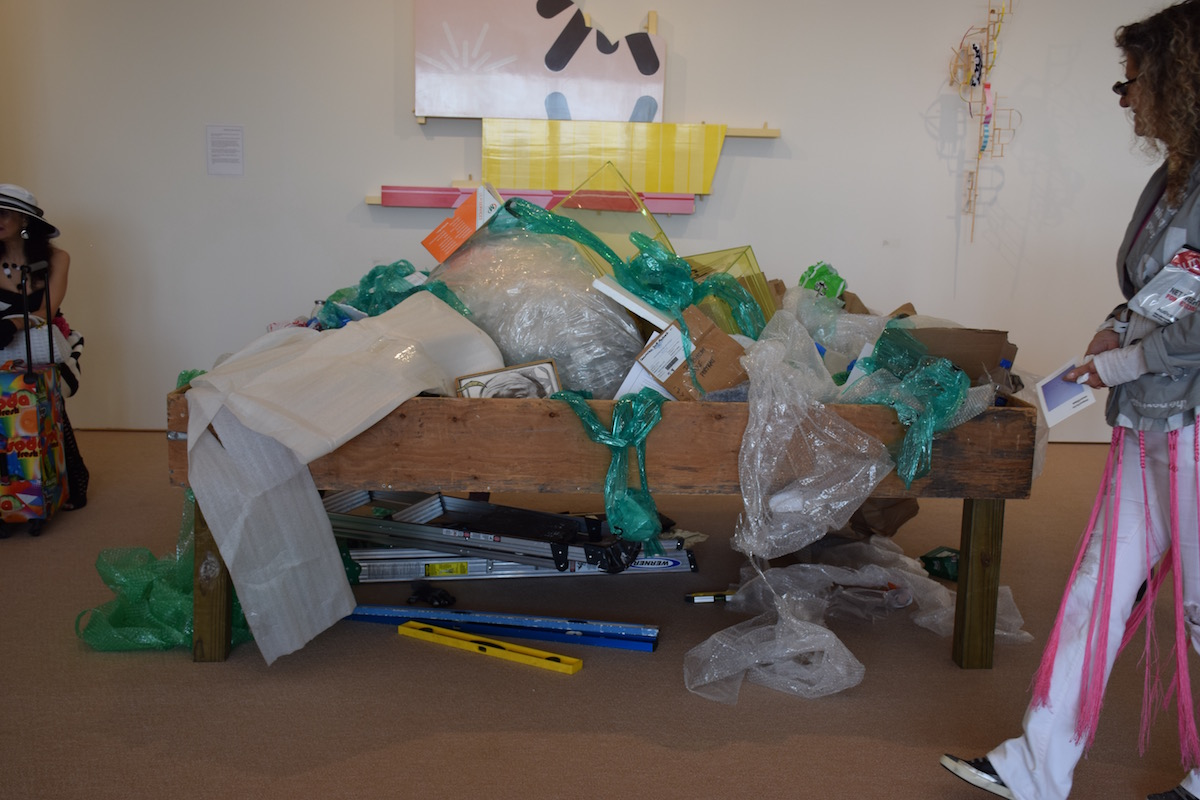
Art installation on the difficulties faced by art gallerists, Art Fair 2016

== Spoon Movement and activism ==
In June 2018, Alvarez collaborated with artist Domenic Esposito on a protest art installation involving a large steel sculpture resembling a heroin spoon placed outside the headquarters of Purdue Pharma in Stamford, Connecticut.

The installation was intended to draw attention to the opioid epidemic in the United States and coincided with an exhibition addressing the crisis at Alvarez Gallery.

The sculpture generated national media coverage. Alvarez was arrested after refusing to remove the installation when requested by police.

== Legal proceedings ==
Following the protest, Alvarez faced charges related to interfering with police. A Connecticut judge later granted accelerated rehabilitation, a legal program that allows charges to be dismissed after completion of a probationary period.

== Media coverage ==
Alvarez's involvement in the 2018 protest installation outside Purdue Pharma received coverage in a number of national and international media outlets. Publications including Time, Hyperallergic, Frieze, and Artsy reported on the installation and the subsequent arrest connected to the protest.

Additional coverage appeared in regional and public media, including Connecticut Public Radio, which examined the installation and its connection to an exhibition addressing the opioid crisis.

The protest installation was also reported through Associated Press coverage syndicated across multiple news outlets in the United States.

== See also ==
- Spoon Movement
- Opioid epidemic in the United States
