= Olympic diploma =

Certificate awarded to Olympic athletes

- Awarded for: Finishing as a top eight competitor for various Olympic Sports
- Presented by: International Olympic Committee

History
- First award: 1896
- Website: www.olympic.org/

An Olympic diploma is a paper certificate awarded to the top eight finishers in competitions at the Olympic Games.

The practice of awarding diplomas has existed from the start of the modern Olympic Games in 1896, at first being awarded only to the winner of each event. The number of participants so awarded has increased over time, expanding to all three medallists from 1923, the top six finishers from 1949, and the current practice of eight from 1981.

The diploma is inscribed and signed by autopen with the signatures of the president of the International Olympic Committee and the head of the organizing committee for each Olympics. The design of the diploma, as with the design of the Olympic medals, is a matter for the local organisers of each edition of the Games. However, the designs must be approved by the IOC.

The New York Times reported in 2014 that, even among athletes who should have received them, many were unaware of the diploma's existence.

As is the case for medals, an athlete who receives a diploma and is subsequently sanctioned for violations of the IOC Code of Ethics, the World Anti-Doping Code, or other charters must return the diploma to the IOC.

== Gallery ==
Olympic diplomas
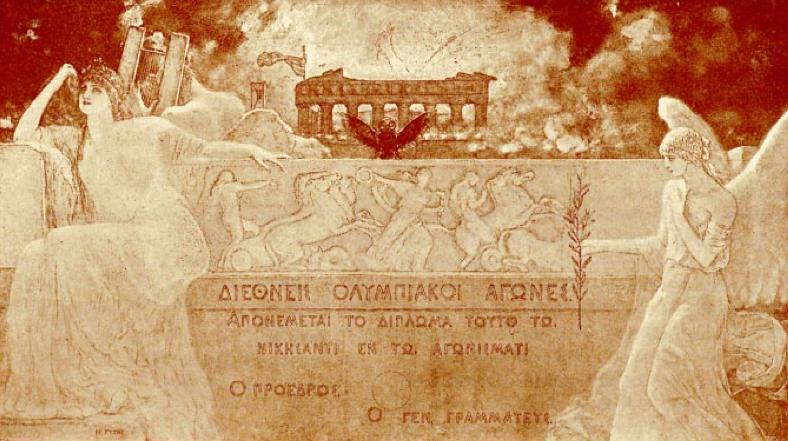
1896 Summer

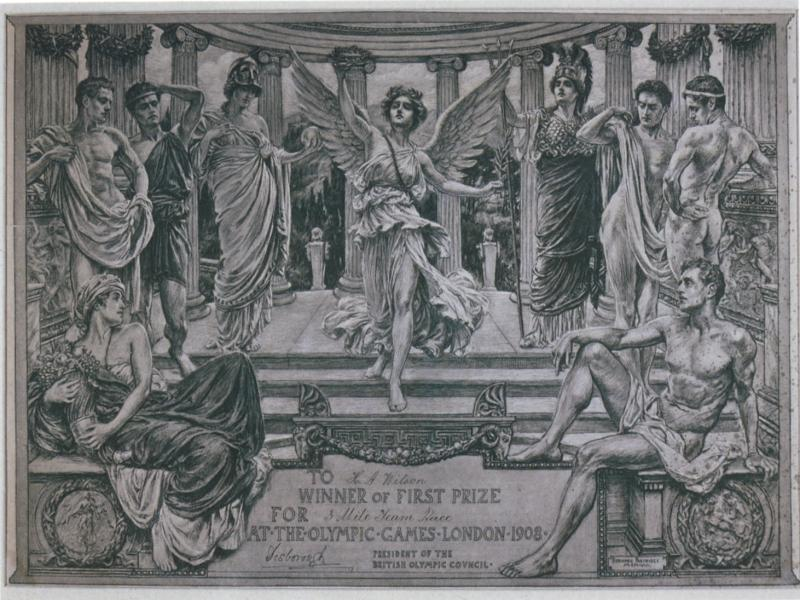
1908 Summer

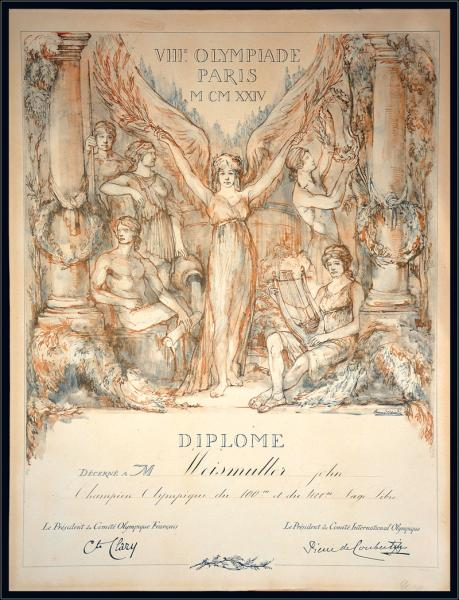
1924 Summer

== See also ==
- Olympic Cup
- Olympic Diploma of Merit
- Olympic Laurel
- Olympic medal
- Olympic Order
- Pierre de Coubertin Medal
