= 2010 Macau labour protest =

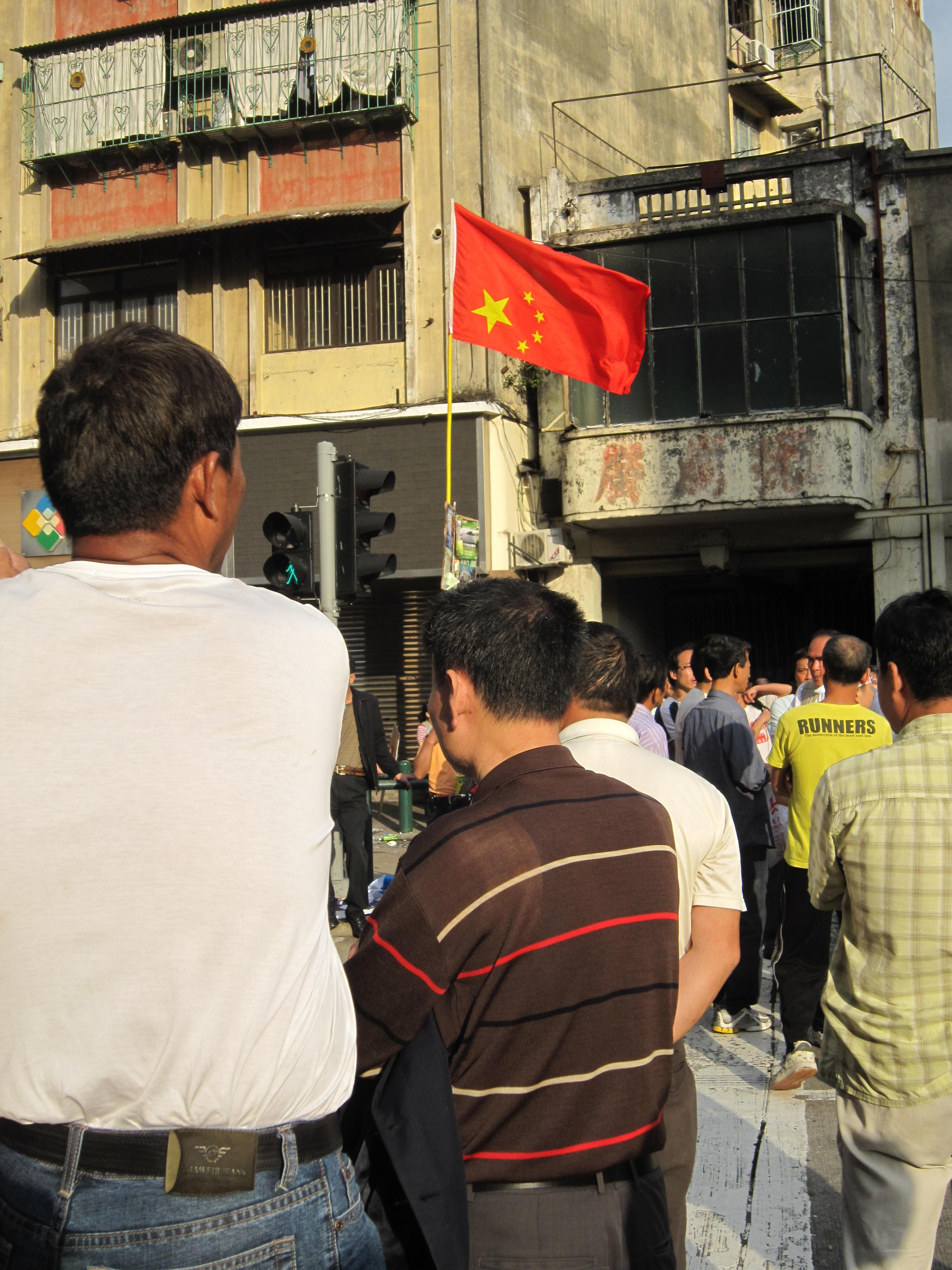
An upside down PRC flag during the protest

The 2010 Macau labour protest (Chinese: 五．一 勞動節遊行) was a protest that occurred on Labour Day 1 May 2010 at Patane, St. Anthony Parish Macau Special Administrative Region of the People's Republic of China. 1 May 2010 was also the opening day of the Shanghai 2010 expo in mainland China.

== Protest ==
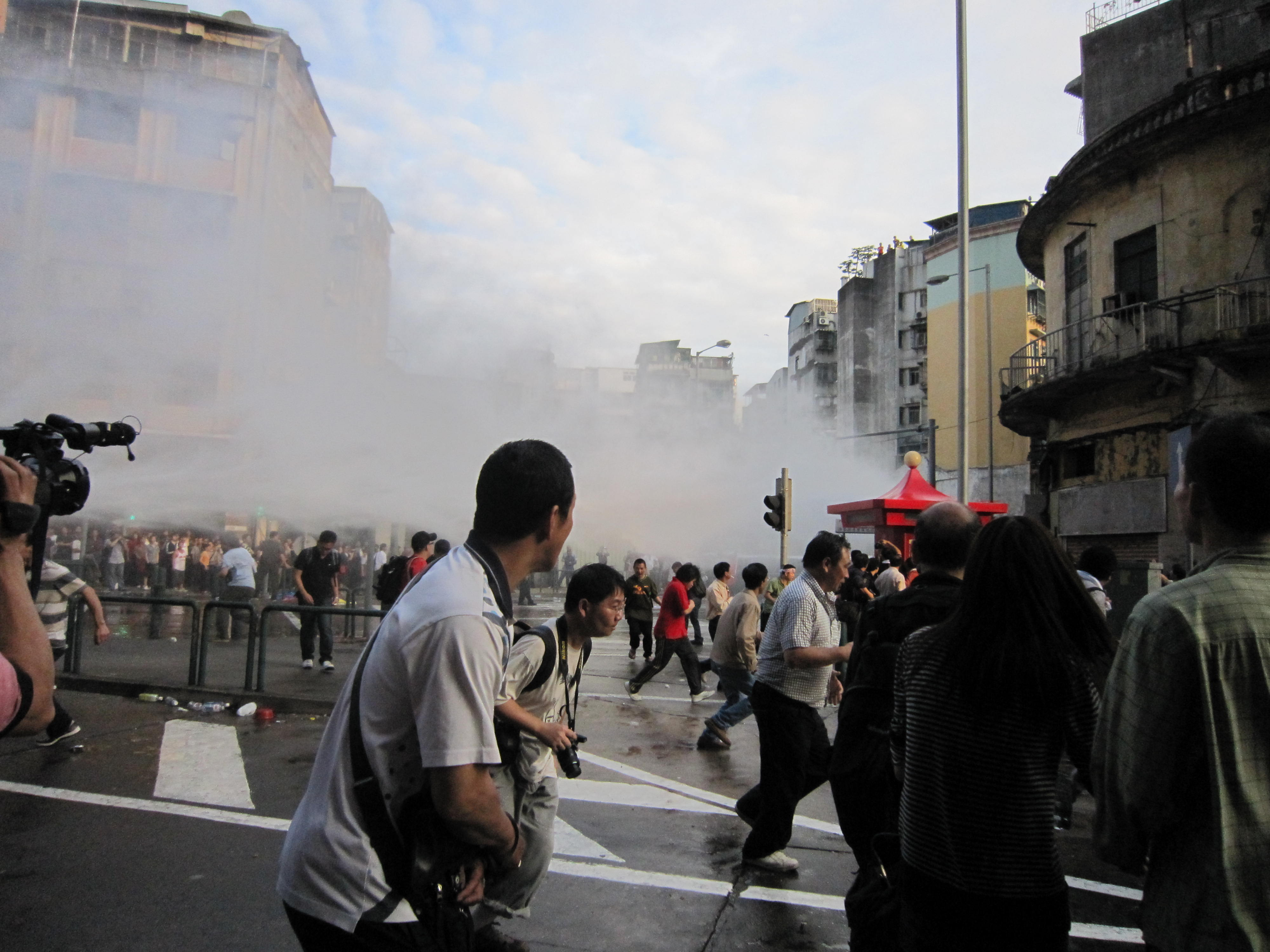
Water cannon shot into protesters

Hundreds of people protested against alleged corruption and illegal labour in Macau. There is a lack of jobs due to influx of cheap foreign labour caused by a recent boom in Macau's casino trade. They accuse the government of ignoring the situation. A protester carried the sign "The government is rich, the casinos are rich, but nobody is looking out for the Macau people." Protesters surrounded a police vehicle and threw water bottles and placards at the officers who fought back with water cannons. Police also fired shots into the air. There were some injuries from the use of the cannons.

== See also ==
- 2007 Macau labour protest
- 2010 Macau transfer of sovereignty anniversary protest
