= Social structure of China =

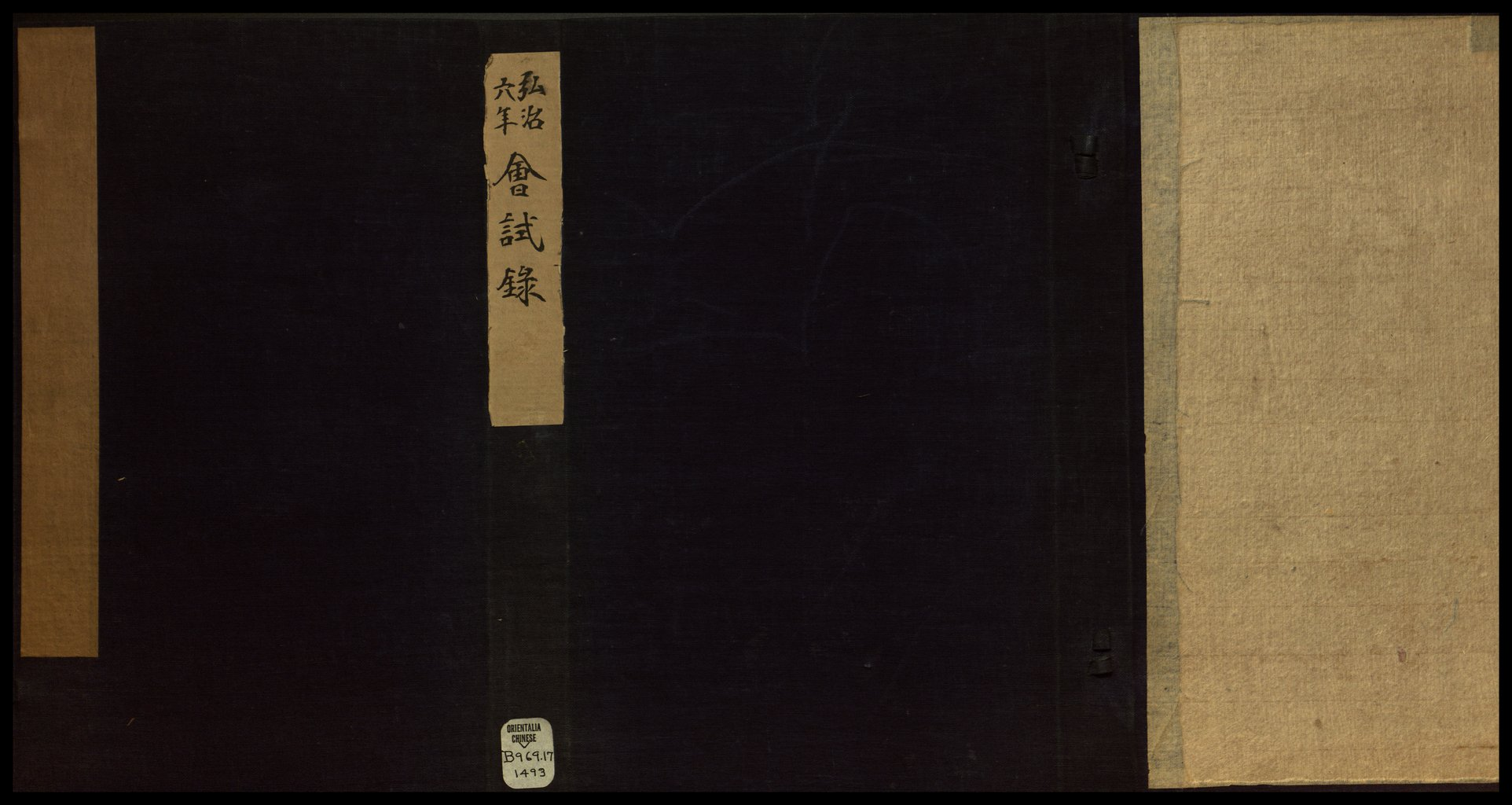
Metropolitan Civil Examination Records from the Sixth Year of the Hongzhi Reign (1493)

The social structure of China has an expansive history which begins from the feudal society of Imperial China to the contemporary era. There was a Chinese nobility, beginning with the Zhou dynasty. However, after the Song dynasty, the powerful government offices were not hereditary. Instead, they were selected through the imperial examination system, of written examinations based on Confucian thought, thereby undermining the power of the hereditary aristocracy.

Imperial China divided its society into four occupations or classes, with the emperor ruling over them. Throughout this time period, there were attempts to eradicate this system. Social mobility was difficult, or sometimes nearly impossible, to achieve as social class was primarily defined by an individual's identity. To rise required passing a very difficult written exam. The great majority failed, but for those who passed their entire family rose in status.

During the Song dynasty, there was a clear division in social structure which was enforced by law. However, commoners could move up in society through the acquirement of wealth. Through passing the imperial exam or donating resources, people could enter the gentry. By the Yuan dynasty, there was a decrease in protection by the law for commoners. The gentry, however, were given more privileges. The Yuan dynasty also saw an increase in slavery, as the slave status became hereditary. The new policy for commoners at this time also made the various categories within the commoner status hereditary. The Ming dynasty saw a decrease in the number of categories for commoners, in comparison to the policy implemented during the Yuan dynasty. The three categories that remained were hereditary, making it nearly impossible to move between them. Gentry was also divided into two types. By the Qing dynasty, the peasants were seen as the most respected class. Merchants were far lower in status unless they purchased gentry status.

During reform and opening up from 1978, the social structure in the country underwent many changes as the working class began to increase significantly. In 21st-century China, social structure is more reliant on employment and education, which allows citizens to have more social mobility and freedoms.

== Confucianism ==
The teaching of Confucius (551 BCE – 479 BCE) taught of five basic relationships in life:

- Father to son
- Older sibling to younger sibling
- Husband to wife
- Friend to friend
- Ruler to structure

For dynasties that used Confucianism (not Legalism), the first noted person(s) in the relationship was always superior and had to act as a guide and leader/role model to the second noted person(s), as the second person was to follow. For example: Father, 1st noted; Son, 2nd noted.

In the Confucian view of the economy, agricultural work was morally superior. The point was work was the embodiment of a social contract. The emperor and his officials worked to ensure the welfare of the people (or "min") envisaged as peasant families. The male miners worked in the fields to produce grain for their own food and for taxes; their wives made clothing for everyone. Agriculture was thus fundamental. Crafts and trade were secondary, and typically pernicious by diverting productive labor and promoting extravagance.

== Early Imperial Period ==
From the Qin dynasty to the late Qing dynasty (221 BCE – 1840 CE), the Chinese government divided Chinese people into four classes: landlord, peasant, craftsmen, and merchant. Landlords and peasants constituted the two major classes, while merchants and craftsmen were collected into the two minor. Theoretically, except for the position of the Emperor, nothing was hereditary.

During the 361 years of civil war after the Han dynasty (202 BCE – 220 CE), there was a partial restoration of feudalism when wealthy and powerful families emerged with large amounts of land and huge numbers of semi-serfs. They dominated important civilian and military positions of the government, making the positions available to members of their own families and clans. The Tang dynasty extended the Imperial examination system as an attempt to eradicate this feudalism.

The Tang and the Song dynasty saw a major transition in the composition of China's ruling elites. From the Han through the Tang, official posts filled by an aristocratic network of several hundred intermarried families based in the capital. Many of them were prominent for 500 years or more, far longer than European feudal dynasties. From the Song on, however, official posts were usually filled by a much larger but less cohesive class of gentry who married and owned property in their home provinces and who rose to prominence through the examination system. Scholarly explanations for the demise of the old class and the rise of the new include Empress Wu's decision to promote newly risen bureaucrats, reforms that followed the An Lushan rebellion, the destruction of aristocratic families in the Huang Chao rebellion, and decisions taken by the families themselves in the Song dynasty to build up local power bases.

== Song dynasty ==
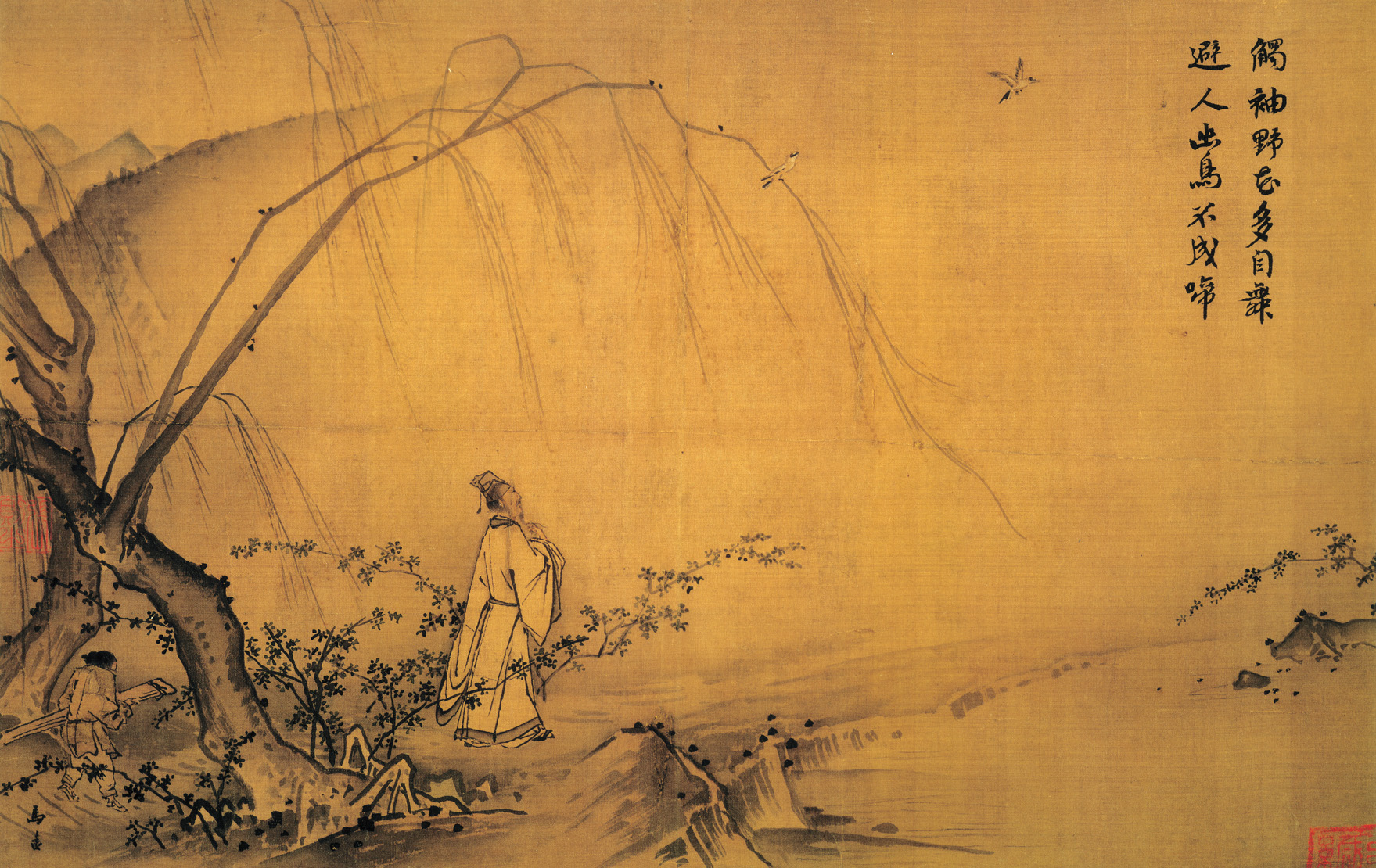
A Song dynasty gentry and his servant depicted by Ma Yuan circa 1225

During the Song dynasty social strata were clearly divided and enforced by the law. At the bottom of the pyramid were the commoners, who were categorized into two groups: fangguo hu (city dwellers) and xiangcun hu (rural population). Fangguo hu and xiangcun hu had ranks. The first rank, commoners (both fangguo and xiangcun), were the wealthiest. The ranks of commoners could change over time, as one who acquired more wealth could be promoted to a higher rank.

On the other hand, gentry and government officials were not commoners. They and their families belong to guan hu (gentry). Guan hu was not an exclusive social stratum like European nobility; by participating and passing the imperial exam, one could be qualified as a member of guan hu. In addition, relatives of a government official can become guan hu through the system of En Yin. In some rarer cases, a commoner could become guan hu by donating a large amount of money, grain, or industrial materials to the imperial court. In 1006, guan hu accounted for 1.3% of the entire population. The percentage of guan hu increased to 2.8% by the year 1190. The growing population of guan hu was partly due to the system of En Yin which allowed a relatively easy entry into the stratum of guan hu.

At the top of the social pyramid was the royal house of the Song dynasty. The royal house consists of the Emperor, Empress, concubines, princes, and princesses. The royal house enjoys the highest quality of life with everything provided by other social strata. With imperial fields (fields that were owned by the emperor), the basic food supplies of the royal house were satisfied. Luxury items in the imperial court also had their sources. Tea, for example, was provided by the imperial tea plantation. Annually, local products from various regions of China were paid as tributes to the royal house.

During the Song dynasty, slave trading was forbidden and punished by law. However, slavery was not entirely absent from the history of the Song dynasty. To some extent, there were slave traders who illegally kidnapped commoners and sold them as slaves. Criminals were sometimes converted to slaves by the government. However, traditional slavery was not a common practice during the Song dynasty. Servants of the wealthy gentry usually kept a contract-like relationship with the lords served.

In reality, the Song society's structure had evolved and changed over time. After the Jingkang incident, the phenomenon of land annexation became increasingly obvious. By land annexation, the wealthy commoners and government officials privatized lands that were public or owned by poorer people. In the late Song dynasty, the society's two ends were polarized. Wealthy landowners devoured most of the cultivable lands, leaving others in extreme poverty. Even the imperial court's profit was curbed. Taxation was illegally avoided by wealthy landowners and the court eventually found itself collecting much less amount of taxes than ever before. Xie Fangshu, an investigating censor famously described the situation as "The flesh of the poor ones becomes the food of the strong ones" (弱肉强食).

== Jurchen Empire ==
The Jurchen Jin dynasty coexisted with the Song dynasty after the Jingkang incident. The Jurchen Empire ruled the northern part of China. Under the Jurchen rule, the conventional code Begile was introduced. Under this code, an emperor and his courtiers were equal. Emperor Xizong of Jin reformed the empire's legal system and abolished the Begile during the reform of Tianjuan. The reform eliminated the aboriginal Jurchen conventions and substituted them with the conventions of the Song and Liao dynasties. During the Jin dynasty, Minggan Moumuke, groups of Jurchen soldiers who settled down in Northern China, changed their nomadic lifestyle to the agricultural lifestyle of Chinese commoners.

== Yuan dynasty ==
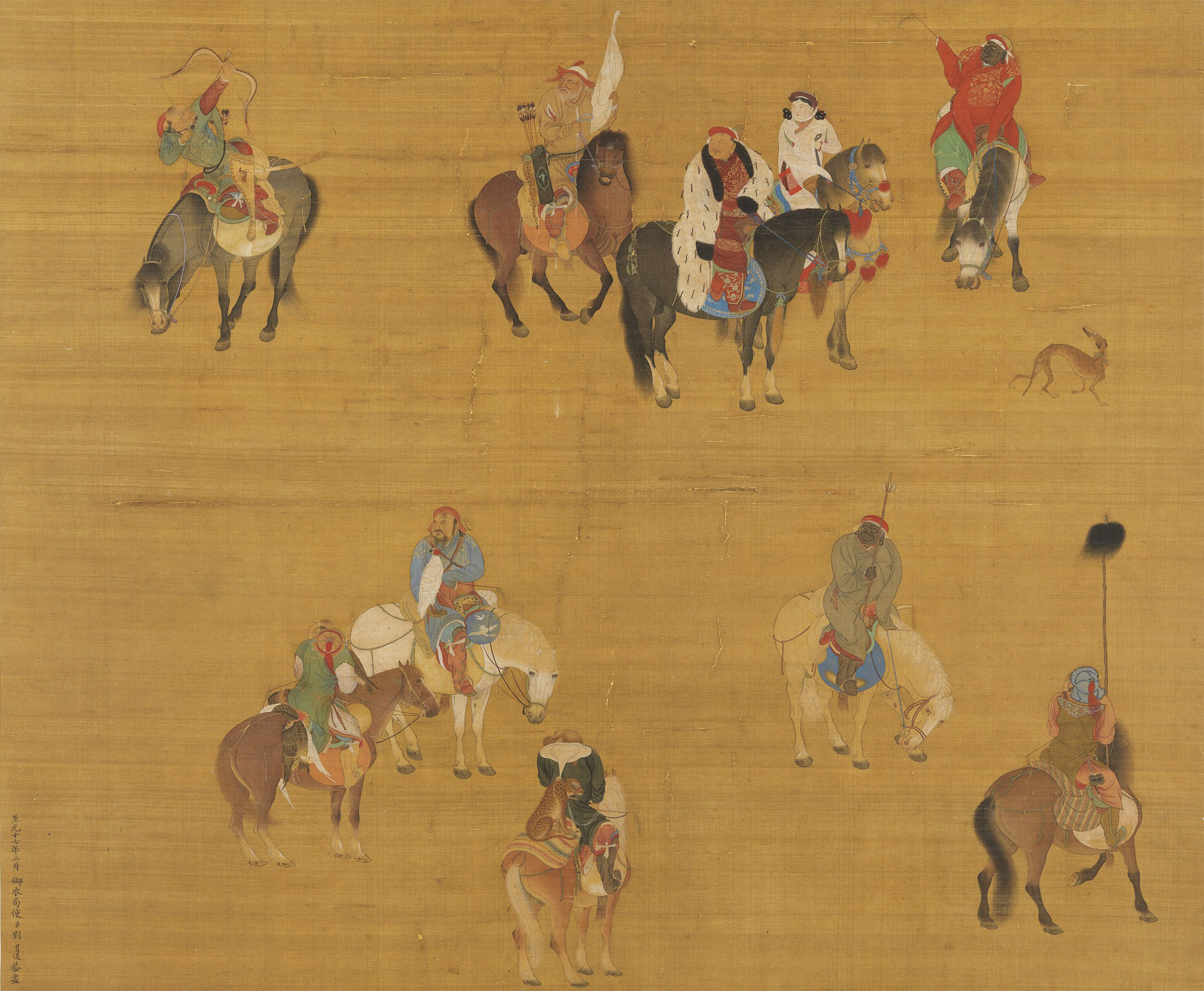
Kublai Khan hunts while accompanied by others

Kublai, the founder of the Yuan dynasty, notably gave many financial privileges to the gentries of Jiangnan region. After the defeat of the Song dynasty by the Yuan, making friends with the local elites of Song became important. As a consequence, the most wealthy ones in the Song social strata remained wealthy in the Yuan dynasty.

Contrary to the situation of the gentry, commoners of the Yuan dynasty found themselves less protected by the law. Mongol rulers did not seem to make the interests of commoners a priority. A great number of ordinary farmers were converted to plantation workers working for the gentries. The wealthy entered upon the properties of commoners while making them essentially slave peasants.

The Mongols in the Yuan dynasty belonged to numerous clans. Tao Zongyi provided a list of the Mongol clans in his c. 1366 Nancun Chuogeng Lu, later shown to be mistaken in various ways by the Japanese historian Yanai Watari. However, Tao's account was one of the few contemporary accounts of Mongols during the Yuan dynasty. The records and documents of the Yuan dynasty provide extremely limited information about the social strata of Mongols. Despite the lack of historical records, it is safe to say that Mongols enjoyed privileges that other ethnic groups did not. During their reign, the Mongols converted a large number of rice fields into pastures because agriculture was foreign to them. Both the government and Mongol nobles opened up pastures in China by taking the rice fields away from ordinary farmers.

Other social categories, including Semu, Hanren, and Nanren, existed under the rule of Mongols. Hanren refers to dwellers of Northern China, Korea, and Sichuan. Nanren refers to citizens of the Song dynasty (excluding people from Sichuan, although the region was a part of Song).

Yuan dynasty introduced the policy of Colored population statistics (Chinese: 諸色戶計). The policy divided commoners according to their occupation. Farmers, soldiers, craftsmen, hunters, physicians, messengers, and Confucian scholars are some of the categories under this policy. The farmers had the largest population among all the commoners in the Yuan dynasty. These categories are hereditary. One soldier will give birth to a son who will later become a soldier. In comparison with other commoners, craftsmen were treated more fairly since the Mongols deemed the skills of making weapons necessary for their conquest of the world. The Mongols routinely massacred Chinese civilians with the exception of Craftsmen.

Slavery was common during the Yuan dynasty. The main sources of slaves include captives, criminals, kidnapped commoners, buying and selling of human lives. Slave status was also hereditary. A slave will give birth to slave children.

== Ming dynasty ==
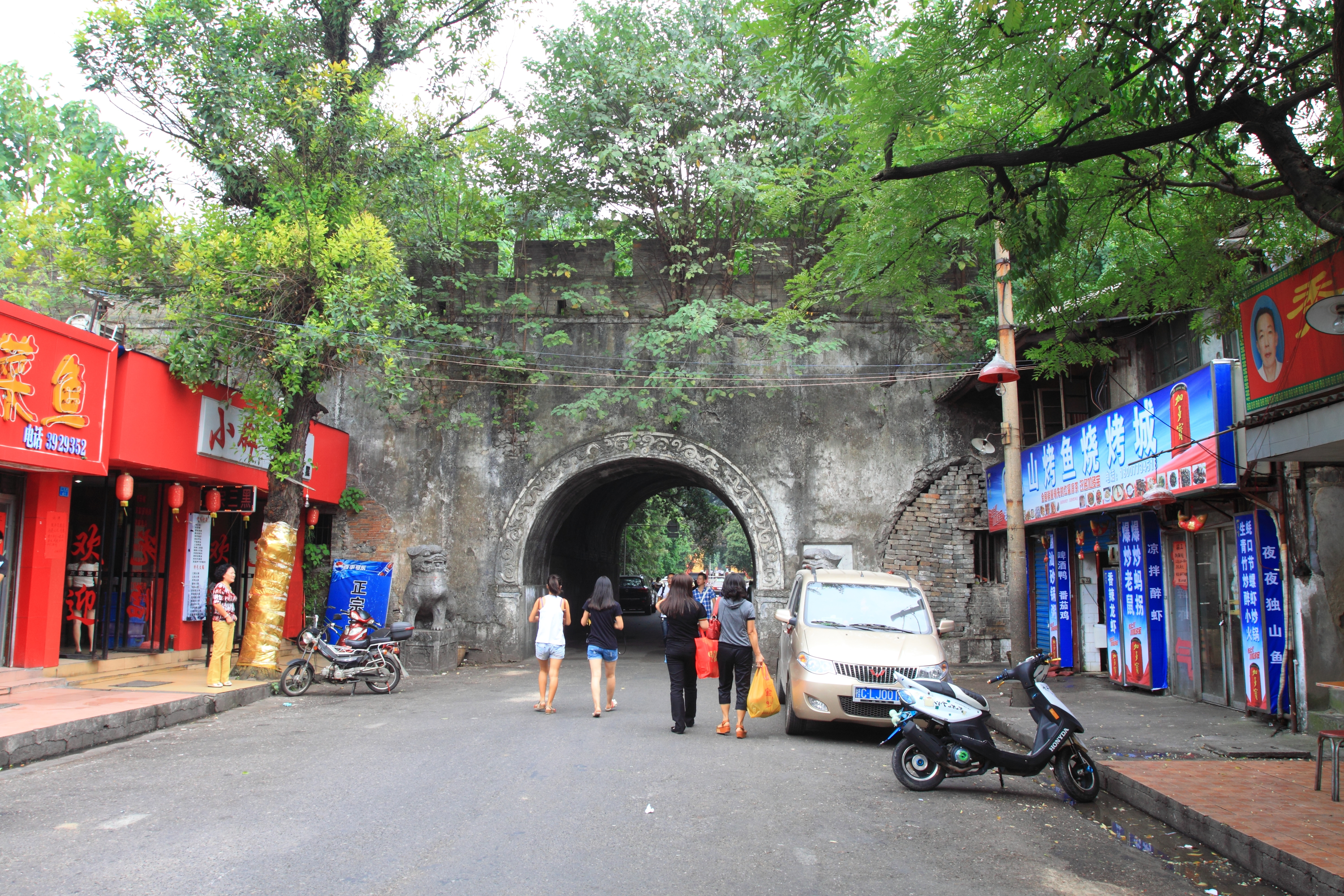
Palace gate of Prince Jingjiang in Guilin. The palace-city of Ming princes is the symbol of privilege they enjoyed during the Ming dynasty

The Ming dynasty, restoring Han rule over China, was formally established in 1368. The imperial court of Ming kept a nationwide register of every subject---Ji (籍). This practice of registering population was inherited from the previous Yuan dynasty. Venetian traveler Marco Polo noticed a similar policy during his visit to Hangzhou. Ming government formalized the registration with the yellow booklet which records every member of a given family. In addition, there was the white booklet which records the taxation of a family.

The policy of colored population statistics of the Yuan dynasty was inherited by the Ming and reformed. The numerous categories of commoners were reduced into only 3 categories: Soldiers, Commoners, and Craftsmen. These household registration categories were hereditary and fixed. Moving from one category to another was virtually impossible. Subcategories of the three main categories were more specific and profession-based. According to Taiwanese historian Cai Shishan, there were also salt refiners which were independent from other 3 categories.

Gentry families during the Ming dynasty belonged to the commoner household registration category. There were two types of gentries. Those who passed the entry-level exam of the imperial exam were called Shengyuan (生員). All Shengyuan receive a fixed amount of allowance from the imperial court. The average amount of allowance ranges from 18 tael to 12 taels. The rest of the gentries mainly earned their living by teaching in private schools as mentors.

Farmers during the Ming dynasty had two groups. Self-sustained farmers accounted for 10% of all farmers while tenants farmers of wealthy landlords made up as much as 90%. They had more burdens and gained less harvest than self-sustained farmers.

Craftsmen were severely exploited by the government. They had to provide free services upon the demand of the imperial court without any reward. The two groups of Craftsmen are: Official craftsmen who directly worked for the court and Common craftsmen who provide paid services for others.

In the Ming dynasty, the Royal house was a large and special social stratum. The royal house of Ming includes any descendants of Emperor Taizu of Ming and his nephew Prince Jingjiang Zhu Shouqian. Emperor Taizu had 26 sons and 19 of them had offspring. With the line of Prince Jingjiang, the royal house consists of 20 different cadet branches. Members of the royal house were not allowed to have an ordinary life by laboring. All the expenditures of the royal house were paid by the money taken from the annual tax revenue collected from commoners. Additional perks such as legal privileges and luxury items were given as gifts by the imperial court. In the middle of the 17th century, the population of the royal house was so large that their living expenditures had taken up to 225.79% of the annual tax revenue causing a virtual bankruptcy of the government.

== Qing dynasty ==
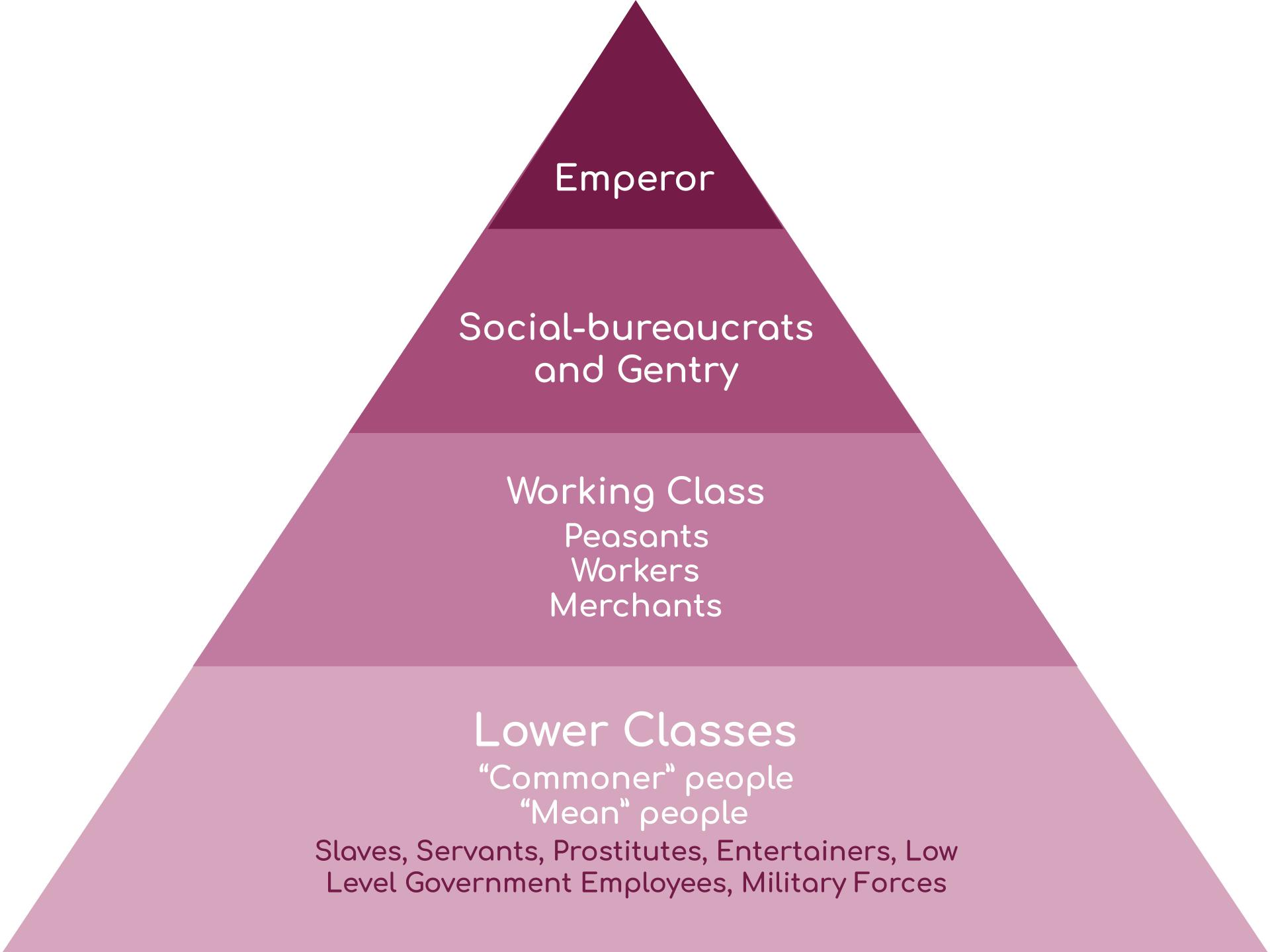
Diagram of the social structure during the Qing dynasty

In the Qing dynasty, the population could be divided into five classes. The top class was the emperor and his immediate family. After that came the gentry (officials of the government). Next came the agriculturalists, landlords, farmers and peasants. Then the artisans and merchants. In last place came the lower classes of vagabonds and criminals. For centuries China had developed its system of social stratification based on the theoretical principles of Confucian philosophy.

By the late 18th century, the system was largely fixed, giving political power at the national, provincial and local levels as well as status to a small number of men who after spending years in elaborate, expensive study, were able to pass extremely difficult written tests in Confucian philosophy. The highest level was known as the "gentry" or the literati. Their numbers grew from 1.1 million in 1850 to 1.5 million in 1900. The exams were the route whereby Han Chinese had access to high government office, which was otherwise largely monopolized by the small Manchu governing minority. The exams became more difficult, and more arbitrary as shown by the notorious "Eight-legged essay". The vast majority of candidates wasted their years on expensive preparation as they failed again and again. Only wealthy families could afford the investment, and for the great majority it did not pay off. Increasingly the richest families instead purchased their certificates of high status. The elite was closed for practical purposes, and those who failed became often very frustrated and even led rebellions. For example, Hong Xiuquan (1813-1864) repeatedly failed, despite innate talents that enabled him to study Christianity in serious fashion and go on to form and lead the greatest rebellion in the 19th century world. Some of his top officials had also failed the exams such as Feng Yunshan and Hong Rengan. Yuan Shikai came from a literary elite but he failed his exams; his family purchased a military command for him and he rose to the top of the military and in 1912 became president of China. The civil service exams were almost ended in the Hundred Days' Reform of 1898 but the reactionaries won out. The system was finally abolished in 1905.

=== Gentry ===
Gentry or Mandarins were government officials. Most Gentry owned land, which was where most of their income came from. For other gentry the main source of income was from their government service. There was a large increase in the gentry class following the victory of the Hunan Army over Taiping in 1864, as many people were given quasi-official titles. Many took official local administrative positions. Others used their military rewards to purchase land and also join the gentry class.

Social-bureaucrats were the officialdom of Qing China. They had the responsibilities of organizing public works projects and had a crucial role in the management of society. Social-bureaucrats wore distinctive clothing, including black gowns with blue borders and a multitude of rank insignia. Commoners addressed them with honorific titles and they received a high status along with favorable legal treatment.

=== Agriculture ===
Far below the Mandarins/literati came the 90% of the population who lived by agriculture, from poor tenant farmers to rich landlords. Many were very poor tenants or day laborers, however others, especially in the southern provinces, were better off and more secure by owning their land. Confucians praised agriculturalists as honest men who provided the nation's food. Famines and floods were serious risks. To forestall local rebellions the Qing government established an elaborate system to protect against famines and other disasters such as epidemics. It was built around a granary system, distributing free or subsidized grain during distress. This system was largely destroyed during the Taiping Rebellion of the 1850s, leaving the population vulnerable. The introduction of sweet potatoes reduced excess hunger and reduced the propensity to revolt.

After suppressing the Taiping Rebellion by the mid-1860s, the national government worked to relieve distress, stabilize society and improve farming. It reduced taxes and required corvée labor, reclaimed land, and promoting irrigation. After 1900 the government set up rural associations that published newspapers and instructional pamphlets for farmers, set up agricultural schools, held local training sessions, as well as agricultural exhibitions,. Programs to continue water conservation and forest station projects continued. The reforms in agriculture were one dimension of a vigorous last-minute effort by the Qing government to rapidly reform education, the military, and local administration.

=== Artisans, merchants and workers ===
Despite the workers' lower status, they often earned more than peasants. Artisans and workers often worked directly for the state or gentry. Merchants were ranked lower because they were seen as unproductive leeches by the Confucians. Merchants could include anyone from street peddlers to entrepreneurs with high influence and wealth. They were assumed to thrive by unethical business practices. They would bribe government officials or use profit-sharing to gain funding. Merchant families could use this wealth to pay for their sons' training for the civil service exams and thus jump to the high levels.

=== Lower classes ===
The lower classes of ordinary people were divided into two categories: one of them the good "common" people, the other the "mean" people. Slaves, servants, prostitutes, entertainers, low level government employees and military forces were part of the mean class. The soldiers were called a necessary evil, and civilians were placed in command to keep the military from dominating society. Those who worked in entertainment were given a special status that allowed for them to be punished severely without consequence. The mean people were heavily discriminated against, forbidden to take the Imperial Examination, and mean and good people could not marry each other.

During the early Qing dynasty, hereditary slavery was a common practice that declined quickly. Slave girls (婢女) were largely sold and bought through contractual agreements where they would serve for a certain number of years.

=== Military Class and the Merchants ===
In the Qing dynasty, the widespread White Lotus Rebellion, whose participants were primarily landless people squeezed out because of commercialization, and the consequent battles destroyed the local agricultural economy. The rebellion at the same time stimulated the Qing government to initiate local militarization. The military organization was funded on its own and stayed autonomous from the central. This militarization process led to the rise of the "military-predatory elite class," which impeded the funding of industrial firms and sucked a considerable amount of surplus in funding on military means. Furthermore, rebellions, including the Taiping Rebellion, harmed the entrepreneurial class, such as merchants' local network.

== The Republic Era (1911 to 1949) ==
After 1911, China entered the Warlord Era. During this time, industrialization was slow to non-existent; between the years 1920 and 1949, the industrial sector had only increased by less than three million members, mainly women, and children working in cotton mills. The main changes in the social structure were the military.

Many laborers were hired to work on the various construction projects at this time. A small portion of the working class were apprentices. They were trained to work in the trades by masters, but were treated similarly to slave girls. Upon reaching the end of the apprenticeship, they were allowed to leave their masters and find work by themselves.

In 1924, the Soviet Union helped Sun Yat-sen rebuild the Nationalist Kuomintang, GMT, and KMT military force, most notably through the Military Academy, an island on Pearl River near Guangzhou. Many military leaders of the following decades were Huangpu graduates, including Lin Biao, as well as nationalist Chinese generals.

=== Rural Society ===
Historian Prasenjit Duara coins the cultural nexus of power to characterize the power dynamics in rural North China. The network of rural cultural institutions, including lineage and religions, legitimized local gentry to institutionalize their interpersonal privileges and achieved grassroots autonomy. However, this power structure was disintegrated during the first half of the twentieth century as the Nationalist government expanded its fiscal power over local communities by establishing new state agencies to collect the tax. Confronted with the heavy burden of the various taxes, the protective brokerage, the gentry who used to collect tax in a sustainable way, retreated from the rural governance and gave their way to the entrepreneurial brokerage, i.e., the local bullies, who collected tax for-profit and impaired the ecology of the rural economy. This process destroyed the alliance among the state, local elites, and rural people without establishing a new system to replace the long-existing power nexus.

Peasant economy also persisted throughout the Republic era. According to Hung, Despite all the economic and social changes happening in the late Qing and Republican era, the peasant economy, particularly in the form of handicraft and household cotton industry, continued to prevail and dominate the rural areas.

=== Urban Workforce ===
In the urban workplace, native-place origins of workers were closely related to the job opportunities. In Shanghai, people with different native-place origins fell into different industries and occupations. Examples were carpenters from Canton and coppersmith from Ningbo. For refugee migrants from the countryside who had fewer native-place bonds and skillsets, they often found affiliation in gang activities and developed community solidarity. Strikes often happened in waves. The May Fourth Movement marked one substantial increase in labor strikes in Shanghai and later culminated again in 1937 at the beginning of the Japanese invasion. Strikes again increased during the Civil War period because of the rising inflation.

=== Family and Gender ===
Family structure went through a significant transformation during the Republican era. Since the late Qing, and especially during the May Fourth Movement, scholars and social activists cast doubts on the utility of the existing large family structure. Some theorized families of big sizes and senior authority as a social problem impeding the agenda of social development. Wu Guanyin, an official at Beiyang government and former international student in Japan, harshly criticized the inequality in large families and its disadvantages for the whole society. In an article published in 1915, he pointed out that in large families where adult sons and their core family members still lived together with their brothers without dividing family property, the male elders had considerable authority to manage family affairs and enjoyed various privileges in social and legal life. He blamed large families for corruption and bribes, claiming that profiting one's own family (mou jia) is in opposition to profiting the state (mou guo). Wu's claim was one of the major intellectual efforts to point out and attempt to solve family problems (jiating wenti) in the Republican period. Exposed to the Western ideal of conjugal families, radicals actively promoted the transformation of family structure. They urged damping the large families where members relied heavily on one another and were placed into an unequal generational hierarchy in an effort to advocate small conjugal families to comply with the Western model.

Gender equality was also a popular topic among radicals during the May Fourth and New Culture Movement. The Kuomintang party further promoted marriage freedom and gender equality in Legal Reforms. The 1930 Civil Code perceived both men and women as equal citizens and granted women more agency to negotiate their interests in marriage and family. Women were entitled to inherit property from their fathers for the first time. The law also elevated mothers to the equal status of fathers in terms of rights over children. In legal practice, many female litigants utilized the new legal codes to defend their personal interests.

Women also made up for a considerable proportion of the entire workforce in urban areas. In Shanghai, most cotton-mill workers were women. Female labor was also important workforce in other industries, including flour mills, carpet making, and cigarette rolling. There were also native-place divisions among urban female workers.

Similar to the gender line, generational hierarchy also went through significant transformation under the Legal Reforms. Instead of preaching "parents can never be wrong," the new criminal and civil codes granted children more agency and treated both children and parents as equal citizens. The Kuomintang party-state changed the former generational hierarchy, backed by the principle of filial piety, to mutual legal bonds between parents and children.

== Mao Era and the transition (1949 to 1978) ==
Entering the People's Republic of China (PRC) era, the Chinese Communist Party (CCP), adopting the Soviet style, transformed the state economy into the centrally planned economy. Both urban and rural areas underwent significant social, political, and economic changes brought by land reform and collectivization. Instead of judging through the amount of owned property, the state imposed new standards to determine one's social status. The standards included one's political class, urban or rural household registration, gender, and ethnic classification.

In 1949, in the wake of the CCP victory in the Chinese Civil War, Chinese society experienced massive upheaval. The communist revolutionaries who had eschewed capitalism and elitism now became the rich ruling class they had sought to overthrow. CCP cadres became the new upper class. Those who were included in this social class made up approximately 20% of the urban working class. Not only were they given benefits, but also provided with special training for their careers. The misuse and manipulation of the ration system by members of the cadre class threatened to change them into a new class of privileged bureaucrats and technicians, mere descendants of the pre-revolutionary ruling class of cadre technocrats and elected representatives of the old proletariat. Whereas in the past, their position had been accessed primarily through acceptance to the best schools, now cadre status came to give them access to materials and options not fairly distributed amongst all. Housing had always been in demand in China, particularly in the larger cities, and cadres were protected from the intense competition for living space.

Major changes to the class labels in China occurred in 1960-1961, 1964-1966, and post-Mao in 1979.

=== Political class and rural land reform ===
In the countryside, the landlord class was eliminated during the Land Reform Movement. In 1959, there were ten million state cadres, thirty-five million state workers, and two hundred million peasants. Chinese society was typical of agrarian societies because the peasant class composed the majority of the population.

Class (jieji) in the context of early PRC history carried both economic and political connotations. According to the party's official document about rural class, "landlords (dizhu)" refer to people who possess land but do not work by themselves or who only do labor incidentally and live primarily on exploiting other people's labor. The category of "landlords" also includes the butlers of landlord households because they helped the rich "landlords" collect money and exploit others. "Rich peasants (funong)" are those who often depend on the exploitation of the other's labor as part of or a significant part of their sources of living. They usually have relatively high-quality production tools. One important indicator is that "rich peasants" hire long-term laborers (changgong) to work for them. "Middle peasants (zhongnong)" may or may not possess land, although most of them do, and they possess a considerable amount of production tools. "Middle peasants" live on their own labor entirely or almost entirely and have a decent amount of production tools. As a result, they slightly exploit or do not exploit others at all. In comparison, "poor peasants (pinnong)" have less or no land, fewer production tools, and are often exploited. "Workers (gongren)" barely have any land or production tools and need to trade the entire or most of their labor for a living.

However, in practice, the use of the class labels often deviated from its definitions in Land Reform law and policies and often carried highly politicized purposes. During the Land Reform, people classified as "rich peasants" or "landlords" sometimes did not really meet the definition, but cadres arbitrarily labeled them. Cadres also assigned class labels based on the conditions of one's earlier generations. Lineage relations were also a critical consideration for cadres and villagers to label their neighbors as "rich peasants" or "landlords." Overall, the practical implementation of class labeling still remains under-researched for now.

During the Land Reform Movement, China substantially improved income inequality by redistributing land and other property. This was accompanied by social chaos and the consequent mass repression of chaos and killings. The Land Reform targeted eradicating landlords and taking over their land, while increasing the landownership by poor peasants. Still, to improve the overall rural incomes, the party helped protect and preserve the rich peasant economy. According to a rural income survey by China's National Bureau of Statistics, the amount of agricultural capital for different classes generally increased from the Land Reform to 1954. For rich peasants, arable land increased from 25.1 to 31.1 mu per household, and draft animals increased from 114.9 to 184.1 per 100 household.

Some soviet scholars, including Chaianov, argue that rural stratification is largely based on generations and is thus a demographic question, which is different from the Marxist definition of class.

Following the implementation of land reforms, Mao Zedong instituted a process of collectivization in response to the selling of land by peasants to the new generation of rich landowners. Afraid of creating a new landlord class, Mao instituted a system of communes where land was supposed to be worked equally by peasants. His idea was to capitalize on the sheer number of peasants and effectively produce a surplus harvest that would help industrialization. This was known as the Great Leap Forward, which was a failure and resulted in the deaths of twenty to thirty million peasants.

The party's emphasis on class line corresponded to Mao's criticism of the Khrushchev regime's "restoration of capitalism" in a famous news article published in 1964. One crucial aspect of the Khrushchev regime's "restoration of capitalism" was that it forgot the class struggle. In contrast, during the Socialist Education Movement, class line and class struggle in China were radicalized. The evil "Four Elements" targeted "landlords," "rich peasants," "counterrevolutionaries," and "bad elements." Despite that, people in practice sometimes held that class status could be inherited from the fathers. During the 1960s, people from bad class background, such as landlords and rich peasants, found it hard to get married. During the Cultural Revolution, although the party publicly refuted the bloodline theory of class status (that the family from which a person was born in decided one's class status), people still closely associated class status with family origin.

"Bad elements" (Chinese: 坏分子; pinyin: Huài fèn zǐ) had been a term previously used by both the Nationalist government and the CCP, where it generally referred to "elements" deemed corrupt, opportunistic, or degenerate. In 1957, Mao categorized bad elements as criminals, describing them as the "thieves, swindlers, murders and arsonists, hooligans' organizations, and elements that cause harm to socialism." Bad elements were viewed as harming socialism indirectly and distinguished from counterrevolutionaries on that ground.

The official administration system was of four hierarchical tiers: provincial municipalities, districts, counties, and townships, from top to down. County-level cadres mostly did not get paid from the official payroll system.

=== Urban-rural divide ===
The early PRC era saw a widened urban-rural disparity. The enforcement of the household registration system (hukou) classified Chinese citizens into the agricultural and non-agricultural population. The system made all migration from the countryside to the city require approval. People with urban registrations enjoyed a series of privileged access to social welfare that the general agricultural population could not get, including better access to food and other consumer goods, low-cost accommodation, education, and other public welfare. However, these urban privileges were based on the state's extraction of resources from the countryside. The state organized rural people into people's communes and implemented the Unified Purchase and Sale system to compel the rural people to sell grain at a fixed low price to the state. The unequal distribution ultimately led to significant differences in people's living standards and social welfare between urban and rural areas. In the late 1950s to early 1960s, the compulsory state procurement of grain under the unified purchase and sale system prioritized urban over rural areas in allocating basic necessities. The net state procurement kept increasing from 14.9 percent in 1956 to 28 percent in 1959. The urban-biased system of food production and rationing system left a much-starved countryside. This is known as the Great Famine.

Apart from unequal access to social welfare and basic necessities, urban bias also lay in the pattern of state investment. The state targeted less at the development of agriculture than industrialization. Although the state investment in agriculture increased during the Famine, it went through a general downward trend in the 1960s and the 1970s. Income and consumption of the urban population increased faster than rural dwellers until the late 1970s. From the late 1950s to the mid-1970s, the income and consumption gap was widened significantly. Economist Thomas Rawski estimates the ratio of urban-rural per capita income to be 3.4 to 1 or 5.9 to 1 in 1978. Economist Carl Riskin estimates the ratio to be between 2.5 and 3. Rural people generally had to acquire a more austere taste for luxury products such as bikes, wristwatches, and sewing machines. The World Bank reports the income ratio to be 2.2 to 1 and the consumption ratio to be about 2.6 to 1 with higher ratios for luxury goods, such as watches, bicycles, and television sets.

Another important aspect of the rural-urban divide during the Mao era was the reduction of urban population after the Famine. High-ranking party leaders, including Chen Yun and Li Xiannnian realized that food consumption of the urban population had been putting too much pressure on the grain production in the countryside. As a result, the party implemented the downsizing policy to send migrants and unwanted urban populations back to communes and successfully limited and deceased the urban population. During the process of downsizing, some urban residents tried to avoid leaving the cities by feigning medical issues or threatening to die. Still, from late 1960 to 1963, the total population dispatched from urban to rural areas was up to 26 million in total. The readjustment of the urban-rural population reinforced the existing urban-biased social dynamic.

The "dual" social structure pushed people to migrate internally from the countryside to the urban areas. Yet, after the famine, the state imposed stricter migration control. There were limited choices for people to realize the upward mobility from rural to urban registration through military service, urban employment, marriage, and the college entrance exam. Yet, despite strict control, hidden and illicit migrations were still ongoing. People negotiated with the hukou system, and many of them traveled between urban and rural boundary. Some people managed to get away from rural registration in the countryside by working on state-owned farms or utilizing their personal relations to stay in the urban areas even without urban registration.

During the Cultural Revolution, the composition of society changed again. Schools were closed and many youths were sent down to the countryside putatively to learn from the peasants. Concern for peasants was reflected in the rural medical and educational services known as barefoot doctors and barefoot teachers. The life expectancy of peasants increased from less than forty years before 1949 to more than sixty years in the 1970s. At the same time, peasants were still the most illiterate, most powerless, and poorest social class.

=== Social stratification in cities ===
In cities, the workplace was also hierarchical. In the early 1950s, most workforce was employed by the private sector. Later by 1956, The party eliminated the private-owned enterprises and transferred them into the state-owned and collectively owned enterprises. Generally speaking, people working in state-owned enterprises enjoyed more social benefits and better job security than those working in collectively owned enterprises. Likewise, heavy industry was prioritized over the light industry, and manual labor over intellectual labor. Workers with longer working experience enjoyed higher salaries and better retirement benefits.

After the Famine, to reduce the burden of state payroll, a dual system in the workplace was established through building a "second-class" system of workers with less pay and other benefits. From 1960 to 1963, the number of workers in the state-owned enterprises decreased, while the number of those working in the collectively owned enterprises increased. The Labor Department identified three categories of workers: workers under long-term employment, temporary urban workers, and peasant-workers. Similar to urban workers on temporary contracts, peasant-workers were also recruited to work in the short term, but the state considered the peasant-workers as part of the rural community. The government set low wages for peasant-workers and prohibited them from joining the permanent urban workforce. In the 1960s, the group of temporary workers, including both urban temporary workers and peasant-workers, kept growing. The number of permanent workers reached 33 million in 1965.

People in the urban work units were also divided into workers and cadres. College students fell into the category of professional cadres. In the Republic era, most university students were from wealthy families closely tied to the gentry or merchant class. After the establishment of the PRC, the background of university students became more diversified. The party recruited more students from poor family backgrounds to higher education. Based on sociologist Deborah Davis's interview, of the sixteen people who were professional workers back in the 1950s, over half of them came from the rural household, urban working-class families, and small business families.

Still, the state's stricter control over migration and household registration made social mobility from the countryside to cities less plausible. Before the strict migration control, it was easier for rural migrants to gradually establish themselves from the beginning as temporary workers or small business holders. After the state systematically imposed household registration, rural migrants had fewer chances to gain footholds in cities and achieve upward social mobility through migration. The birthplace, in cities or the countryside, became crucial to one's status in the social hierarchy.

Meanwhile, under the state monology over economic and social capitals, upper-middle classes in cities lost most of their access to resources to achieve mobility. Under the urban work units, social life was closely tied to the workplace. The former upper middle classes were no longer allowed to establish independent associations or other professional organizations to expand professional social networks and set their distinct class boundaries. During the Three-anti and Five-anti Movement, the distinct lifestyle of upper middle classes was labeled "bourgeois crimes." The Cultural Revolution intensified the tendency of demoralizing the refined lifestyle.

=== Provincial level spatial inequality ===
One notable feature of the urban structure was the spatial imbalance. The early 1950s witnessed a decrease in spatial inequality as the party endeavored to close the gap of income among different regions. For example, the party built most of the industrial plants, under the Soviet help, in inland areas instead of coastal areas, and the former treaty ports were not prioritized in the First five-year plan. Such efforts to level spatial inequality continued during the Great Leap Forward, but the regional inequality persisted. Compared with the 1952 provincial ranking, the richest provinces maintained their top rankings in 1964, while the poorest stayed at the bottom.

Spatial disparities among regions persisted from 1963 onward. Particularly, provinces with higher industrial investment rates and better-established industrial bases had the fastest growth rates. Many of these provinces' advantages came from history. Examples are Liaoning, the city formerly under Japanese colonial rule, and Shanghai, the city with an exceptional economic foundation in the nineteenth century. Even with the party's effort to bridge the developmental gap through the Third Front investment and the Down to the Countryside Movement, regional economic disparity continued.

There are two general trends from 1963 to 1978. First, regional disparities overall increased. Variation in GDP per capita for all jurisdictions increased from 0.71 to 0.99. Beijing and Shanghai grew more than two times than western provinces. Second, if excluding the large cities (Beijing, Shanghai, Tianjin, and Liaoning) from the calculation, variation in GDP per capita decreased from 0.36 to 0.26. Although still substantial by 1978, spatial disparity among the remaining provinces improved. Growth rates of many inland provinces which benefitted from rural industrialization and the Third Front Construction, such as Gansu, Xinjiang, Heilongjiang, Shanxi, and Inner Mongolia, exceeded the average.

Data from Chinese National Statistical Bureau show that at the end of the Mao era, China's industrialization largely focused on three regions. Manchuria, the former Japanese colony, inherited a considerable industrial base from the Republic era and continued benefitting from its rich natural resources. The second one was the broad area centering Shanghai, including the Zhejiang-Jiangsu region, which was also historically advantaged. The third concentration included Inner Mongolia, Xinjiang, and western Sichuan, which was largely historically marginalized but gained fast development through the party's Third Front policy.

=== Family and gender ===
Family structure during the Mao era also changed. The marriage law in 1950 granted more agency to women for marriage and divorce and advocated equal relations between husbands and wives. It prohibited concubinage and child brides. Following the path of the Nationalist government, the state also promoted an equal relationship between parents and children. The marriage law reinforced the mutual legal bonds for both parents and children. Not only did it stipulate the children's obligation to provide old-age support to their parents but it also emphasized parents' legal duty of raising and supporting their children. Meanwhile, the new social systems that re-arranged people into work units or communes altered the parent-child relations and weakened the historically significant parental authority. Remunerated by work points, family members became less financially dependent on each other.

Women's liberation was an important political agenda of the party. Particularly, the party emphasized women's participation in production in achieving gender equality. The state depicted divergent, even conflicting images of women, with some emphasizing the productive skills while some the domestic role of women, to meet various economic and labor situations. In urban areas, women and men nominally were remunerated equally, but in reality, men often secured jobs with better payment and more social prestige. In rural areas, more women were mobilized to participate in agricultural production. Historians show that in China's collective farm, women were—on the one hand—mobilized to cultivate grain and cotton under the notion of gender equality and—on the other hand—constrained by gendered division of labor, and were burdened with domestic labor. Some women had to bear physical suffering as a result of having to continue working hard shortly after they gave birth. In big water constructions, rural women had to do heavy manual labor and, at the same time, took housework responsibilities. The party forcefully transformed rural women into productive roles while overlooking their reproductive responsibilities and health. Even when the state sought to monopolize the cotton industry under the unified purchase and sale system, rural women continuously engaged in handicraft, weaving and spanning to make cloths for household usage as they had been historically doing. Apart from working for the collective farms and other construction work, they crouched the shoulders and worked overtime late in the night after their husbands and children went to sleep.

The Maoist state generally did not outlaw third genders, but officially it also ignored LGBTQ. However, homosexuality in practice was usually demoralized and could face severe political consequences. In some struggle sessions during the Cultural Revolution or self-reflections, homosexuality was often referred to as a crime or serious problem. For example, a young cadre in a factory accused of homosexuality faced fierce political criticism.

=== Four classes ===
Flag of the People's Republic of China

In a speech made shortly after the communist's victory in 1949, Mao Zedong claimed that Chinese society was governed by four distinct revolutionary social classes opposed to the reactionary landlord class and "bureaucrat-bourgeoisie" class; this is often cited as the reason why the Chinese flag has four small stars on it. The large fifth star, which is surrounded by the four smaller stars, is meant to represent the Communist Party. In his On the People's Democratic Dictatorship speech he defined the Chinese people as consisting of four social classes: the working class, the peasantry, the urban petty bourgeoisie and the national bourgeoisie. Mao made the claim that these classes had been unified by the revolution, but severe class stratification still existed in post 1949 China, especially when comparing the rights ordinary citizen to the extreme privileges afforded to the elites of the Chinese Communist party.

Before the economic reform of 1978, the time period between the mid-1950s to 1977 saw a shift in China's focus as they began to remove outdated labels and thousands were granted working class status. The concept of "two classes and one stratum", a Soviet theory, was soon introduced and was composed of the peasant class, working class, and the intellectual stratum. During this time, the number of individuals who were part of the working class increased greatly. Media also began to spread propaganda about the urban working class that painted them as superior, naming them the "leading class". Soon after, people in society began to mirror this sentiment as the respect for the proletariat increased. In terms of the peasant class, the number of farmers increased year by year, despite the industrialization going on in China. The intellectual stratum consisted of those with high school or university education, making up a small portion of the population. Due to the vague definition of "intellectual", it is difficult to know exactly how many people were in this stratum. However, it is estimated that there were around 5 million people.

=== Social elites and the emergence of new class ===
Social elites in the Mao era generally fell into two different groups. The "new elites" mostly gained their social status as the "revolutionary cadres." The new elite group also included revolutionary soldiers and children of revolutionary martyrs. They mostly came from poor rural families with limited education experience and mostly rose to power during the wartime. Scholars find that 80 percent of the party members in 1949 came from peasant households and that most of them were of little cultural capital accumulated through education. The "old elites" were better-educated people from wealthy families. They were under serious attack in the first a few years after 1949 and were usually labeled as the exploiting class. Although politically despised, the old elites still kept considerable advantages in knowledge and skills. The political power structure was Red-over-Expert. People with various managerial knowledge and technical expertise were subordinate to the leadership of red cadres. The two groups of elites were of different social origins, but they also had overlaps, such as the party members who held a college degree. Both the old and new elites only consisted of a small proportion of the entire population. The new elites made up less than 1 percent of the population. The old rural elites made up 4.3 percent, and the old urban elites made up 1.4 percent. Yet, they both stayed at the top of the social hierarchy.

In the first years of the PRC era, the two had sharp conflicts, but gradually converged when they were reproducing their elite positions. People from the new elite families could easily reproduce their social status by passing on their political credentials and background to their children. At the same time, political origins and family background provided the new elites with better access to education due to the political consideration behind school admissions. Also, old elites with more cultural capital also gained advantages in political recruitment into the party membership, Youth Pioneers and the Youth League. As the two groups started to converge, a new class emerged as technocrats. They enjoyed both political and cultural capital.

Mao and other top party leaders made efforts to level class differences in three aspects. Land reform was a systematic endeavor to remove unequal property ownership. The Socialist Education Movement was targeted at making education more accessible to a broader range of the population. The efforts to level cultural capitals peaked during the Cultural Revolution. In terms of political leveling, the party targeted not only the old elites but also the cadres. In the mid-1960s, Mao himself warned the rise of a bureaucratic class who were detached from workers and peasants and betrayed the revolution. Mao's hostility towards party leaders motivated a more systematic and violent attack on the party officials later in the Cultural Revolution. Just as the new social class of the technocrats was emerging from the converge of the old and new elites, the leveling efforts destabilized the consolidation of this new class. Later, the Cultural Revolution completely disturbed the growth of the technocratic class. In the late Mao era, they were not mature or powerful but after the Cultural Revolution they became the dominating power of the state.

=== Ethnicity ===
Unlike the Soviet where Russians made up less than half of the population, in China, Han Chinese people made up more than 90 percent of the entire population. The party extended the concept of Chinese nation with only five races to fifty-six ethnic groups. Most non-Han minorities lived in rural and less developing areas.

== Reform and opening up (1978 to 2000) ==
After the reform and opening up policy was implemented in the late 1970s, the Communist system Mao had instituted disintegrated in the face of economic development. In the countryside, communes had disappeared by 1984. State-run enterprises known as danweis began to lay off workers, "smashing the iron rice bowl" because of their expense and inefficiency. The previous "two classes and one stratum" theory underwent many changes during this time as both the working and peasant class were divided further. However, the peasant class decreased in size while the working class saw significant growth.

In 1978, Deng Xiaoping stated that science was a productive force and that scientists were workers. These statements had a significant impact in lifting the class stigma associated with intellectuals since 1949.

The years leading up to the 21st century brought great economic growth and industrialization for China, but this growth did not translate to the rate of social development as the income gap between urban and rural areas of China continued to widen. By 1993, approximately 22.4% of the working class population accounted for 51.8% of China's GDP. By this point, the social structure was no longer as hierarchical in comparison to the early years of the reform.

In 1992, social inequality became a large topic of debate, as wealth continued to accumulate within a small minority population of the country. This was a result of the corruption of bureaucratic capitalism which, in turn, lead to the middle working class having access to very few resources. The imbalance of social structure at this time became evident as both the working and peasant class were marginalized.

The working class at this time was still divided, but a new stratum soon came into existence. This consisted of those who had lost their jobs, those who had retired, as well as migrant workers. Migrant workers were generally underpaid and had poor living conditions, but there were some that were able to start small businesses. Due to the difference in financial and career circumstances of different migrant workers, migrant workers spanned across multiple classes.

== 21st century ==
Researchers at the Chinese Academy of Social Sciences who specialize in studies of social stratification and mobility describe several dimensions of economic and social status in the social structure of China in the 21st century. One researcher identifies ten broadly defined social strata, including government officials, private and small business owners, industrial workers, agricultural laborers, and the unemployed. By 2016, agricultural laborers made up only approximately 40% of China's working class. Service workers made up the largest portion of China's working class, surpassing the industrial workers.

The working middle class at this time was seen to be the leading class as they gained more economic resources and production power. With the increase of people in the working class, they were seen to be representative of China's productive forces as well as the people who would improve the overall economy of the country. There was also a positive viewpoint in China surrounding the middle class as they were seen to earn a decent amount of money and were well qualified for their positions.

Since 2002, China has been actively engaged in the deliberate expansion of its middle class. As of 2020, there are approximately 400 million middle income citizens of China.

The 21st century also saw a decrease in the percentage of peasants in proportion to the overall working class as the economic reform gave them more freedom in their professional lives. Many young people living in rural communities also began to find it more appealing to attend university or find jobs in the city. There has been a major shift in the thinking of the youth, seen through the older ages of those working in farming. Finding individuals under the age of 40 still working in agriculture is now much more difficult than it was before. Prior to the 21st century, social class was primarily determined by identity rather than employment and education. This reform presented citizens, especially rural workers, with more social mobility and choice.

== See also ==
- Four occupations
- Comprador § China, business owner
- Royal and noble ranks of the Qing dynasty
