= 2010 Macau transfer of sovereignty anniversary protest =

The 2010 Macau transfer of sovereignty anniversary protest (Chinese: 2010年澳門回歸示威遊行) occurred on 20 December 2010 on the 11th anniversary of the transfer of sovereignty over Macau. Protesters complained about the lack of universal suffrage and price of housing.

== Background ==
In December 2010, the Chinese government sent two pandas to Macau for good will. The names of the two pandas were Hoi Hoi (開開) and Sum Sum (心心), which together mean 'happy' (開心) in Chinese. The Macau government had already arranged a million dollar luxury home for the pandas, while many people were living in unaffordable poor public housing. The 3,000m^{2} panda pavilion at Seac Pai Van Park was budgeted at 80-90 million patacas (about US$10,000,000).

== Protest ==
The protest initially started with the Macau pro-democracy camp and members of the labor union. The march went from Iao Hon Park to the government offices shouting slogans and waving banners. The theme was to fight against government corruption, fight for democracy, and improve livelihood. (反貪腐、爭民主、保民生). About 1,200 to 1,300 people participated wearing panda masks.

More criticism followed that the pandas should be called Po Po (普普) and Syun Syun (選選), which together mean 'universal suffrage' (普選). Others called for affordable housing and universal suffrage for the 2019 Macau chief executive election. Chief Executive Fernando Chui was accused of ignoring high inflation and rocketing home prices.

== Reactions ==
Fernando Chui responded saying livelihood is his prime concern and he does listen to the demands and views of the public. Meanwhile, previous Macau chief Edmund Ho won the Grand Lotus Medal of Honour.

== See also ==
- 2007 Macau transfer of sovereignty anniversary protest
- 2010 Macau labour protest
