= 2007 Macau labour protest =

- Traditional Chinese: 2007年澳門勞動節遊行
- Simplified Chinese: 2007年澳门劳动节游行
Transcriptions
Standard Mandarin
- Hanyu Pinyin: 2007-nián Àomén Láodòngjié Yóuxíng
Yue: Cantonese
- Jyutping: 2007-nin4 ou3 mun4*2 lou4 dung6 zit3 jau4 haang4

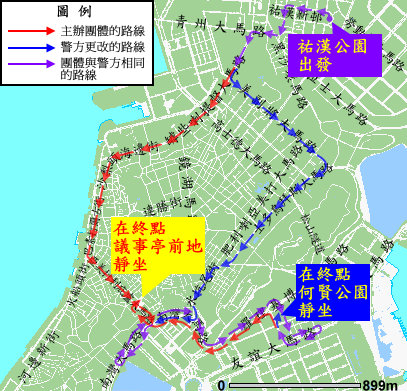
Protest route map

The 2007 Macau labour protest (2007年澳門勞動節遊行) was a large scale protest that occurred on Labour Day May 1, 2007 in the Macau Special Administrative Region of the People's Republic of China. The event eventually turned violent.

== Protest to riot ==
On May 1, 2007, about 2,400 demonstrators turned out to decry official corruption and rail against illegal immigrants working in Macau's construction industry. Though some sources point to the event as having 5,000 participants and eventually grew to 10,000. Witnesses said scuffles erupted when protesters hurled water bottles at police and tried to break through police line. Local television stations showed police beating back protesters with batons and dragging away a number of them.

The protest then turned into a riot. Public Security Police Force officers fired warning shots into the air to disperse the crowd. A passing motorcyclist was struck in the neck by one of the bullets. The 50-year-old man Leung Ngai-keong (梁毅強) survived, but this affected the reputation of the police. Riot police later confirmed five shots were fired into the air during the protest. The police chief said 10 people were arrested and 21 police officers were injured. Protesters carried banners calling for better labour protection. Some demanded the resignation of Edmund Ho, the Chief Executive of Macau, who was appointed by Beijing. The protest lasted about six hours.

== Hong Kong response ==
HK politician Leung Kwok-hung staged a protest in Macau Friday calling on Ho to punish the police officer who opened fire. Leung, accompanied by four members of the April Fifth Action group, marched from the Macau-Hong Kong Ferry Terminal to the Macau government headquarters at Avenida da Praia Grande. He and other Macau labor union representatives read out a statement asking the government to apologize for the incident and review its handling of protests.

== See also ==
- 2007 Macau transfer of sovereignty anniversary protest
- 2010 Macau labour protest
