= People's democratic dictatorship =

Maoist political concept of democracy

- Simplified Chinese: 人民民主专政
Transcriptions
Standard Mandarin
- Hanyu Pinyin: Rénmín Mínzhǔ Zhuānzhèng

People's democratic dictatorship is a Chinese Communist Party (CCP) term to describe the state system of the People's Republic of China. The premise of the people's democratic dictatorship is that it is led by the working class, based on the alliance of workers and peasants, and the system exercises democracy over the people who constitute the vast majority of the national population, while perceived hostile elements are subject to dictatorship. The CCP and state represent and act on behalf of the people, but in the preservation of the dictatorship of the proletariat, and possess and may use coercive powers against perceived reactionary forces.

The phrase is incorporated into the constitution of the People's Republic of China and the constitution of the Chinese Communist Party (CCP). The term forms one of the CCP's Four Cardinal Principles set forth by Deng Xiaoping. Implicit in the concept of the people's democratic dictatorship is the notion that dictatorial control by the party is necessary to prevent the government from collapsing into a "dictatorship of the bourgeoisie", a liberal democracy, which, it is feared, would mean politicians acting in the interest of the bourgeoisie. This would be in opposition to the socialist charter of the CCP. The concept, and form of government, is similar to that of "people's democracy" and a "people's democratic state," which was implemented in a number of Central and Eastern European Communist-controlled states under the guidance of the Soviet Union.

== Origins ==
The concept of people's democratic dictatorship is rooted in the concept of "New Democracy" promoted by Mao Zedong in Yan'an during the Chinese Civil War. In a September 1948 report to the CCP Politburo, CCP Chairman Mao Zedong called for establishing "a people's democratic dictatorship based on an alliance of workers and peasants under proletarian leadership." According to Mao, this alliance "is not limited to workers and peasants, but is a people's democratic dictatorship that allows the participation of bourgeois democrats."

The term's best known usage occurred on June 30, 1949, in commemoration of the 28th Anniversary of the founding of the CCP. In his article, On the People's Democratic Dictatorship, Chairman Mao expounded his ideas about a People's Democratic Dictatorship as well as provided some rebuttals to criticism that he anticipated he would face. Mao also referenced the concept of people's democratic dictatorship in his opening and closing speeches at the September 1949 first meeting of the Chinese People's Political Consultative Conference (CPPCC).

== Political theory ==
At its founding the PRC took the form of a people's democratic dictatorship. On September 29, 1949, the CPPCC unanimously adopted the Common Program as the basic political program for the country following the success of the Chinese Communist Revolution. The Common Program defined China as a new democratic country which would practice a people's democratic dictatorship led by the proletariat and based on an alliance of workers and peasants which would unite all of China's democratic classes (defined as those opposing imperialism, feudalism, and bureaucratic capitalism and favoring an independent China).

In a Maoist political framework, revolutionary consciousness and revolutionary activity distinguish "the people" from counter-revolutionaries. Within the PRC, the democracy includes united revolutionary classes and supportive political parties led by the CCP. It could include workers, peasants, intellectuals, petite bourgeoisie, and even national bourgeoisie who supported the revolutionary project. With regard to the inclusion of members of the national bourgeoisie, Mao stated, "[I]n order to counter the oppression of imperialism and improve its own underdeveloped economic status, China must use all the advantages of the national economy and the people's livelihood, not harmful urban and rural capitalist factors, to unite the national bourgeoisie and work together. Our current policy is to control capitalism, not to eliminate it."

"The people" thus encompasses the vast majority of the population. They can and are encouraged to participate democratically. Those regarded as counter-revolutionary are subject to the coercion implicit in the "dictatorship" until they are reformed.

Mao stated that in this early period after the revolution, the focus is on "democracy for the people and dictatorship over the reactionaries." As historian Rebecca Karl summarizes:

With this theoretical justification, a dual state form was promoted: a democratic one for "the people" and a dictatorship for all others. There was no pretense as to non-partiality. The PRC state was a state for revolutionary people -- the coalition of peasant and proletariat as well as those who could claim to have the correct revolutionary consciousness.

People's democratic dictatorship is a method of democratic centralism which depends on the mass line. According to CCP General Secretary Xi Jinping, China's system is a socialist state under a working-class led people's democratic dictatorship "which is under the leadership of the CPC ... and the principle of democratic centralism."

== See also ==
- Aggravation of class struggle under socialism
- Dictatorship of the proletariat
- Marxism
- Marxism–Leninism
- Maoism
- Politics of the People's Republic of China
