= Zeng Liansong =

Designer of the flag of China

- 曾联松
- Born: 17 December 1917; Rui'an, Zhejiang, China
- Died: 19 October 1999 (aged 81); Shanghai, China
- Education: National Central University
- Occupations: Secret agent Supply chain manager
- Known for: Designer of the national flag of the People's Republic of China
- Political party: Chinese Communist Party (1938–1940, 1985–1999)

Zeng Liansong
- Traditional Chinese: 曾聯松
- Simplified Chinese: 曾联松
Transcriptions
Standard Mandarin
- Hanyu Pinyin: Zēng Liánsōng
- Gwoyeu Romatzyh: Tzeng Liansong
- Wade–Giles: Tseng Liang-sung
- Yale Romanization: Dzēng Lyángsūng
- IPA: [tsə́ŋ ljɛ̌nsʊ́ŋ]
Yue: Cantonese
- Yale Romanization: Jāng Lyùhnchùhng
- Jyutping: Zang1 Lyun4cung4
- IPA: [tsɐ́ŋ.ly̏ːntsʰʊ̏ŋ]
Southern Min
- Hokkien POJ: Chan Liân-Chhêng

Zeng Liansong (simplified Chinese: 曾联松; traditional Chinese: 曾聯松; pinyin: Zēng Liánsōng; 17 December 1917 – 19 October 1999) was a Chinese supply chain manager and secret agent of the Chinese Communist Party best known for designing the flag of the People's Republic of China. He also served as the deputy manager of the Shanghai City Daily Necessities Company and a member of the CPPCC Shanghai Committee.

== Early life and education ==
Zeng Liansong was born in Rui'an, Zhejiang. He studied at Rui'an County Primary School (now Rui'an City Experimental Primary School) and Rui'an High School in his youth.

In 1936, Zeng was admitted to the Department of Economics of the National Central University. He later joined the Anti-Japanese and National Salvation Federation at the university and devoted himself to the Chinese Communist Revolution. He joined the Chinese Communist Party (CCP) in May 1938, engaged in underground activities, and served as the secretary of the underground student party branch of the CCP at the National Central University.

== Career ==
Zeng's proposal for the People's Republic of China national flag.

After his graduation in 1940, Zeng served as an underground worker (secret agent) for the CCP. In 1949, he worked as a secretary at the Shanghai Modern Economic News Agency (上海现代经济通讯社), a secret economic news stronghold and intelligence agency led by the Shanghai Underground Party of the CCP (中国共产党上海地下党). In May 1949, the People's Liberation Army gained control of Shanghai. Having completed its historical mission, the Shanghai Modern Economic News Agency was disbanded. Soon after, Zeng saw the solicitation notice for the national flag of the People's Republic of China and devoted himself to the design work.

In mid-August 1949, Zeng submitted the pattern drawing to the preparatory meeting of the new Chinese People's Political Consultative Conference (CPPCC). It depicted a field of Chinese red with four gold stars around a larger star in the canton. The larger star contained the hammer and sickle symbol of communism. Zeng's design was very similar to the design that the nation adopted, the only difference being the removal of the hammer and sickle symbol from the larger star.

After the Shanghai Modern Economic News Agency was disbanded, he worked at the Eastern China Supply and Marketing Cooperative Management Bureau (华东供销合作社事业管理局). In 1950, Zeng was invited to Tiananmen Square in Beijing to attend the first anniversary of the founding of New China and received a letter from the General Office of the Central People's Government Committee. The letter read: "Mr. Zeng Liansong: The national flag of the People's Republic of China designed by you has been adopted. We hereby present you with a commemorative volume of the People's Political Consultative Conference and RMB 5 million to be sent through the post office and the People's Bank of China respectively as a reward for your contribution to the country, and we express our deep respect."

During the Anti-Rightist Campaign in 1957, Zeng was put on the "blacklist" because he copied a quote from Vladimir Lenin on his teacup: "Speak fewer nice words and do more practical things." During the Cultural Revolution, he was labeled a "traitor" and a "filial son and grandson of the landlords and bourgeoisie." He was put on struggle sessions and his house was confiscated, and he was later sent to a 7 May Cadre School for labor reform.

After the Cultural Revolution, Zeng worked as the deputy manager of the Shanghai City Daily Necessities Company (上海市日用杂品公司). He also served as a member of the 5th session of the CPPCC Shanghai Committee and a member of the Standing Committee of the 6th session of the CPPCC Shanghai Committee.

Zeng retired in 1983. He authored books including "A Summary of the Development History of Ceramics" and "Knowledge of Daily Necessities", as well as some poems. He once wrote in a poem: "A fool's gift to the motherland, under the Five-Starred Red Flag, the seas and mountains stand magnificent."

On 19 October 1999, Zeng died at the Shanghai Municipal First People's Hospital. He was 81 years old.

== Communist Party membership ==
Zeng joined the CCP when he was in college at the National Central University in May 1938. However, due to the White Terror created by the Kuomintang in February 1940, Zeng received an emergency transfer notice and left Chongqing in a hurry without completing the transfer procedures of his party membership organizational relations. As a result, he lost his membership in the CCP.

After the founding of the People's Republic of China, Zeng began reapplying to join the party. In 36 years, he filed five party membership requests. On 1 October 1979, the 30th anniversary of the founding of the People's Republic of China, Zeng was once again invited to Beijing to participate in National Day activities. He continued to reapply after he retired in 1983. In November 1985, the 68-year-old Zeng was finally approved to rejoin the CCP. As a special case, he did not need a preparatory period before becoming a formal member. By this time, he had suffered a second stroke and struggled to walk.
