= Flag of China =

People's Republic of China
- Five-star Red Flag
- Use: Civil and state flag, civil and state ensign
- Proportion: 2:3
- Adopted: 27 September 1949 (approved); 1 October 1949 (introduced)
- Design: A large golden star within an arc of four smaller golden stars, in the canton, on a field of Chinese red.
- Designed by: Zeng Liansong

Flag of China
- Simplified Chinese: 中国国旗
- Traditional Chinese: 中國國旗
- Literal meaning: State flag of China
Transcriptions
Standard Mandarin
- Hanyu Pinyin: Zhōngguó guóqí
- Bopomofo: ㄓㄨㄥ ㄍㄨㄛ´ ㄍㄨㄛ´ ㄑㄧ´
- Wade–Giles: Chung^{1}-kuo^{2} kuo^{2}-ch'i^{2}
- IPA: [ʈʂʊ́ŋkwǒ kwǒtɕʰǐ]
Yue: Cantonese
- Yale Romanization: Zùngwók gwókkei

Flag of the People's Republic of China
- Simplified Chinese: 中华人民共和国国旗
- Traditional Chinese: 中華人民共和國國旗
- Literal meaning: State flag of the People's Republic of China
Transcriptions
Standard Mandarin
- Hanyu Pinyin: Zhōnghuá Rénmín Gònghéguó guóqí
- Bopomofo: ㄓㄨㄥ ㄏㄨㄚ´ ㄖㄣ´ ㄇㄧㄣ´ ㄍㄨㄥ` ㄏㄜ´ ㄍㄨㄛ´ ㄍㄨㄛ´ ㄑㄧ´
- Wade–Giles: Chung^{1}-hua^{2} Jen^{2}-min^{2} Kung^{4}-ho^{2}-kuo^{2} kuo^{2}-ch'i^{2}
- IPA: [ʈʂʊ́ŋxwǎ ɻə̌nmǐn kʊ̂ŋxɤ̌kwǒ kwǒtɕʰǐ]
Yue: Cantonese
- Yale Romanization: Zùngfàa Jànman Gùngwogwók gwókkei

Five-star Red Flag
- Simplified Chinese: 五星红旗
- Traditional Chinese: 五星紅旗
Transcriptions
Standard Mandarin
- Hanyu Pinyin: Wǔ xīng hóng qí
- Bopomofo: ㄨˇ ㄒㄧㄥ ㄏㄨㄥˊ ㄑㄧˊ
- Wade–Giles: Wu^{3} hsing^{1} hung^{2} ch'i^{2}
- IPA: [ù ɕíŋ xʊ̌ŋ tɕʰǐ]
Yue: Cantonese
- Yale Romanization: Ngh sèng gùng kei

The national flag of the People's Republic of China is a Chinese red field with five golden stars charged at the canton. The design features one large star, with four smaller stars in an arc set off towards the fly. The five stars and their relationships to each other represent the unity of the Chinese people, symbolized by four smaller stars, under the Chinese Communist Party (CCP), symbolized by the large star. The red represents the Chinese Communist Revolution. It is commonly called the "Five-star Red Flag" (Note: Chinese: 五星红旗; pinyin: Wǔxīng Hóngqí) in China.

China's first national flag, called the Yellow Dragon Flag, was adopted by the Qing dynasty in 1862, featuring an Azure Dragon on a plain yellow field with a flaming red pearl in the upper left corner. On 10 January 1912, after the Xinhai Revolution and the establishment of the Republic of China, the Five-Colored Flag was adopted as the national flag by the Beiyang government, featuring five colored stripes representing the five major ethnic groups in China. After the Kuomintang overthrew the Beiyang government in the Northern Expedition, a flag consisting of a red field with a blue canton bearing a white disk surrounded by twelve triangles was adopted as China's national flag.

The Five-star Red Flag was adopted as the national flag of China upon the proclamation of the People's Republic of China on 1 October 1949. The flag was designed by Zeng Liansong, and approved by the Chinese People's Political Consultative Conference. The flag was first hoisted by the People's Liberation Army (PLA) on a pole overlooking Beijing's Tiananmen Square on 1 October 1949, at a ceremony proclaiming the establishment of the People's Republic of China.

== Current design ==
=== Symbolism ===
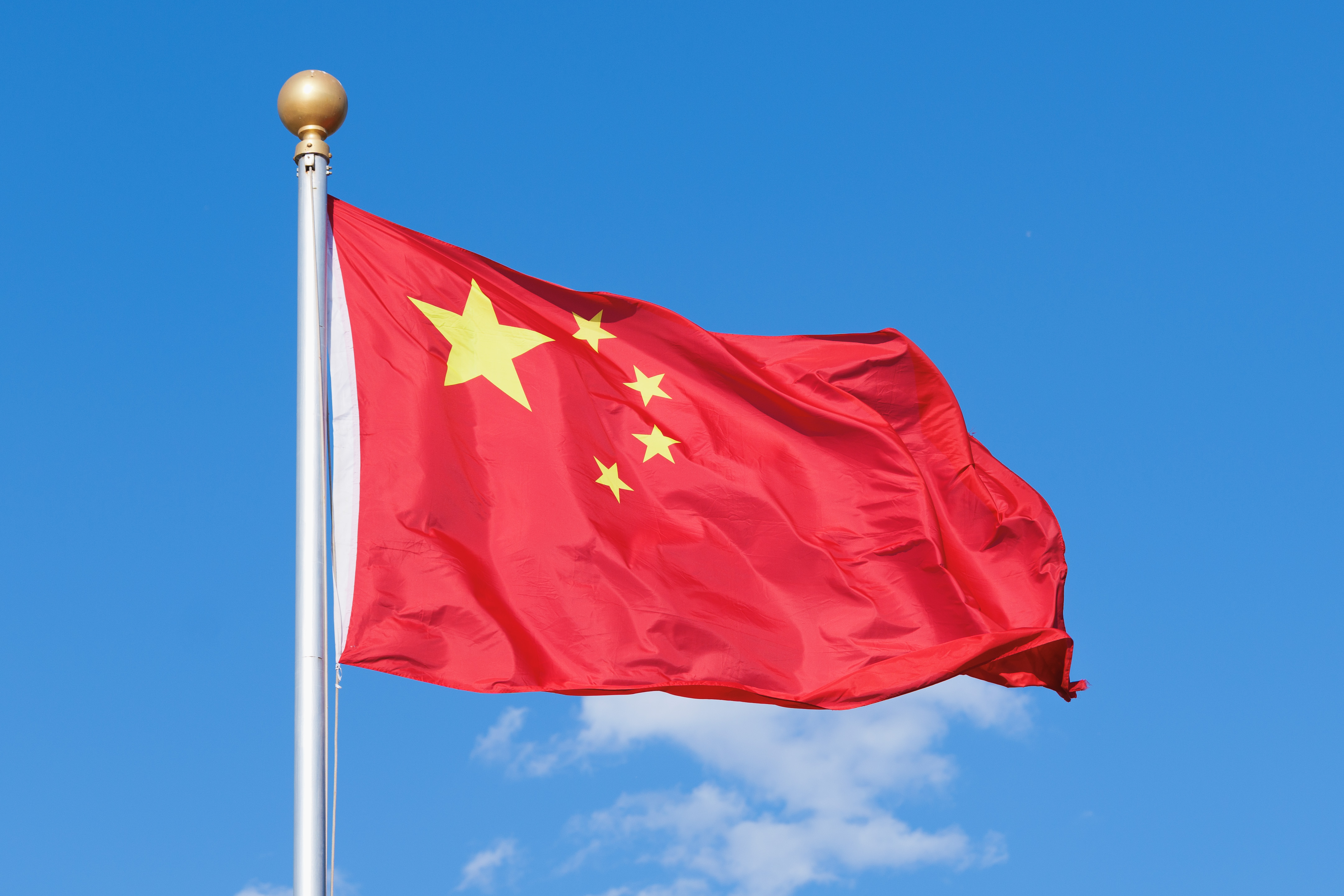
Flag of China waving in the wind

According to the official interpretation of the flag, the red background symbolizes the Chinese Communist Revolution. The five stars and their relationship represents the unity of the "whole Chinese people" led by the Chinese Communist Party. According to China Daily, the orientation of the stars "represent all hearts of millions of the people toward [the] great Communist Party of China".

At its conception, the larger star symbolized the CCP, and the four smaller stars symbolized the four social classes of China's New Democracy mentioned in Mao Zedong's "On the People's Democratic Dictatorship": the working class, the peasantry, the urban petite bourgeoisie, and the national bourgeoisie. The 1992 National Flag Law and the 1991 National Emblem Law describe the stars as "symbols of the People's Republic of China" generally, and do not define what they stand for specifically.An official youth study guide describes the stars as the "CPC and the people of all nationalities around the country."

It is sometimes incorrectly stated that the five stars of the flag represent the five largest ethnic groups in China: Han, Zhuang, Hui, Manchu, and Uyghur. This is generally regarded as an erroneous conflation with the "Five Races Under One Union" flag, used by the Beiyang government of Republic of China, whose different-colored stripes represented the Han, Hui, Manchus, Mongols and Tibetans.

=== Construction ===
The construction sheet for the national flag was published on 28 September 1949 by an order from the Presidium of the First Plenary Session of the CPPCC. The document "GB 12982-2004: National flag" was released by the National Standardization Administration on 16 January 2004.

Construction sheet	Standard
	1. The flag is split into 4 sections, with the top hoist part of the flag being a grid of 15 by 10 units.; 2. The center of the biggest star is placed at 5 units from the hoist and 5 units from the top of the flag; the diameter of the biggest star's circumscribed circle is 6 units.; 3. Of the 4 smaller stars, the first one is centered 2 units from the top of the flag, 10 units from the hoist; the second one is centered 4 units from the top of the flag and 12 units from the hoist; the third one is centered 7 units from the top of the flag and 12 units from the hoist; the fourth one is centered 9 units from the top of the flag and 10 units from the hoist.; 4. The diameter of each small star's circumscribed circle is 2 units. Each of the top points of the 4 smaller stars are rotated such that they point towards the center of the larger star.

=== Size specifications ===
The Law on the National Flag notes five possible sizes that could be made for the national flag. Article 4 of the National Flag Law directs the people's governments of provinces, autonomous regions and municipalities directly under the Central Government to authorize companies to make any copy of the national flag. Besides five official sizes for flying on flagpoles, there are another four smaller sizes for other purposes, such as decoration on cars or display in meeting rooms.

Size	1	2	3	4	5	6	7	8	9
Length × width (cm)	288 × 192	240 × 160	192 × 128	144 × 96	96 × 64	66 × 44	45 × 30	30 × 20	21 × 14

=== Color specifications ===
The colors of the national flag are stipulated in the document "GB 12983-2004: Standard Color Sample of the National Flag", and promulgated by the Standardization Administration of China. The colors are in specified in CIE 1964 xyY_{10} color space under standard illuminant D65.

Standard color sample of the national flag
Fabric		Luminance Y_{10}	Color coordinate		Allowable error margin
Fabric		Luminance Y_{10}	x_{10}	y_{10}	Allowable error margin
Synthetic fiber	Red	9.4	0.555	0.328	All are $\Delta E_{ab}^{\,\bullet}\le 2.0$
Synthetic fiber	Gold	41.2	0.446	0.489	All are $\Delta E_{ab}^{\,\bullet}\le 2.0$
Silk	Red	12.3	0.565	0.325	All are $\Delta E_{ab}^{\,\bullet}\le 2.0$
Silk	Gold	32.4	0.450	0.463	All are $\Delta E_{ab}^{\,\bullet}\le 2.0$
Cotton cloth	Red	9.2	0.595	0.328	All are $\Delta E_{ab}^{\,\bullet}\le 2.0$
Cotton cloth	Gold	33.0	0.467	0.463	All are $\Delta E_{ab}^{\,\bullet}\le 2.0$
Sleeve	White	78.0	–	–	The luminance Y_{10} must not be less than 78

For computer display, the National Flag Law defers to standard PNG images posted on the National People's Congress website. The specific colors used, in the sRGB space of the PNG file, are:

People's Republic of China	Red	Yellow
RGB	238/28/37	255/255/0
Hexadecimal	#EE1C25	#FFFF00
HSV	357/88/93	60/100/100

=== Unicode ===
The Flag of China is represented as the Unicode emoji sequence U+1F1E8 🇨 REGIONAL INDICATOR SYMBOL LETTER C and U+1F1F3 🇳 REGIONAL INDICATOR SYMBOL LETTER N.

== Protocol ==
The Law of the People's Republic of China on the National Flag was passed by 14th Meeting of the Standing Committee of the 7th National People's Congress on 28 June 1990 and came into effect starting 1 October 1990. The law set regulations on how to make the Chinese flag, what it looks like, where it can be flown and how it can be flown. The law also states that the national flag is "the symbol and hallmark of the People's Republic of China" and that everyone "shall respect and care for the National Flag".

=== Display ===
Proper vertical display of the flag

The National Flag Law stipulates the flag must be hung daily at the Tiananmen Square and Xinhuamen, the locations of the Central Committee of the Chinese Communist Party, the Standing Committee of the National People's Congress, the State Council, the Central Military Commission, the Central Commission for Discipline Inspection, the Supreme People's Procuratorate, the National Supervisory Commission and the National Committee of the Chinese People's Political Consultative Conference, the Ministry of Foreign Affairs, airports, ports, railway stations and other ports of entry and border or coastal defense posts.

The flag should be hung at all departments under the Party Central Committee and all local Party committees, all departments of the State Council, the standing committees of local people's congresses, local people's governments, local and special people's courts, local disciplinary inspection committees and local supervisory commissions, local and special people's procuratorates, local committees of the Chinese People's Political Consultative Conference, and all democratic parties and people's organizations, or property belonging to said places or institutions on working days. National flags should be raised in full-time schools except during vacations and Sundays. Schools are required to display the national flag every day except during winter and summer vacations and rest days, while public cultural and sports facilities are mandated to display the flag on the days they are open. In addition, the flag is displayed in public squares, parks and other public venues, as well as by residential buildings during important national holidays.

The flag displayed in the aforementioned conditions are raised in the morning and lowered in the evening. A Flag Raising Ceremony may be held during displays of the national flag, where the March of the Volunteers, the national anthem, shall be played or sung. Participants should stand at attention facing the national flag and salute. The ceremony is to be held daily at the Tiananmen Square, while schools hold the ceremony once a week except during holidays. When raising or lowering on an upright flagpole, the flag should rise and fall slowly. When raised, the flag must be raised to the top of the pole. When lowered, the national flag must not be allowed to touch the ground. When flown at half-mast, the national flag should first be raised to the top of the pole, and then lowered into a position where the distance between the top of the flag and the top of the pole is one-third of the total length of the flagpole; and when it is lowered, the national flag should first be raised to the top of the pole before lowering. The flag is not required to be raised in severe weather conditions. Damaged, faded or substandard flags must not be used, and the flag must not be displayed upside down or hung upside down.

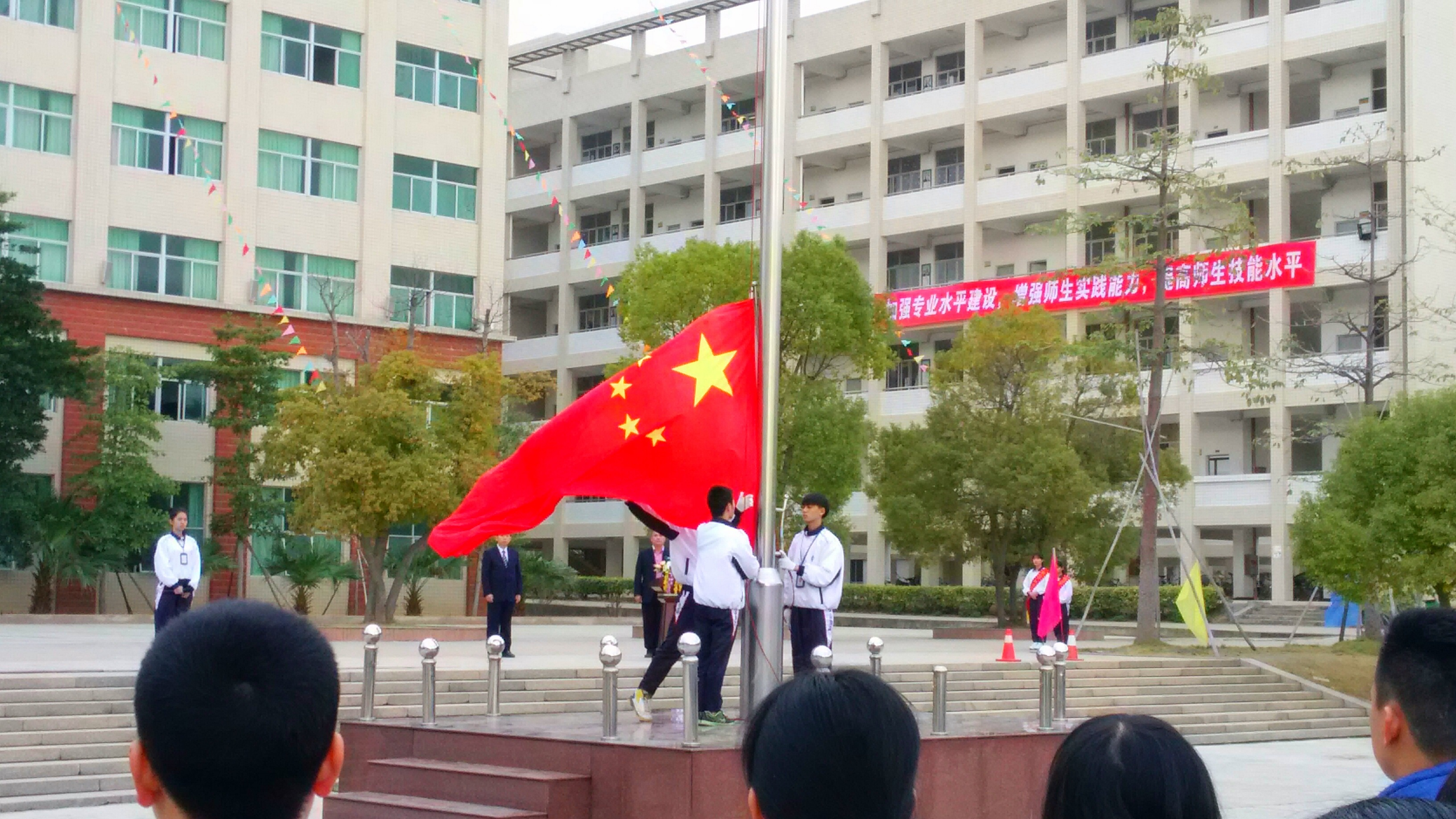
A flag-raising ceremony in a school in China.

The national flag of China takes precedent over other flags of the state. The national flag is to be in front of any other flags when raised or carried in a procession. Additionally, when the national flag and other flags are displayed at the same time, the national flag is to be placed in a central, higher, or prominent position. Since 2017, the CCP flag has taken precedence over the national flag during military parades, while the national flag has taken precedence over the PLA flag. When the national flags of two or more countries are displayed, protocol is regulated by the regulations of the Ministry of Foreign Affairs. The Central Military Commission is authorized to provide methods for the display and use of the national flag by the People's Liberation Army and the People's Armed Police.

The Ministry of Transport, in accordance with the National Flag Law, formulated the Regulations on the Management of the Raising of the National Flag on Ships, stipulating that Chinese-flagged ships of 50 gross tons and above, ships navigating outside China's territorial waters and in Hong Kong and Macau, as well as official vessels, shall fly the Chinese national flag daily; foreign-flagged ships entering the inland waters, ports, and anchorages of China shall also fly the Chinese national flag daily. The regulations also specify the size of the national flag that should be flown by ships of different lengths. Among Chinese airlines, only Air China is permitted to display the national flag on its aircraft.

During the Shenzhou 5 mission, the Five-star Red-flag was carried into space for the first time. In 2020, the Chang'e 5 deployed the Chinese flag on the moon, making China the second country after the United States to do so. The flag was made from a composite material to withstand the Moon's harsh environment without fading or deforming. In 2024, the Chang'e 6 displayed the Chinese flag at the far side of the Moon for the first time.

==== Half-mast ====
The Chinese flag must be lowered to half-mast as a token of mourning when any of the following people die:

- President of the People's Republic of China
- Chairman of the Standing Committee of the National People's Congress
- Premier of the State Council
- Chairman of the Central Military Commission
- Chairman of the National Committee of the Chinese People's Political Consultative Conference
- People who have made outstanding contributions to the People's Republic of China.
- Those who have made outstanding contributions to the cause of world peace or human progress.

The flag may also be flown half-mast nationally or in specific places in the case of severe natural disasters, public health emergencies, or other events that cause heavy casualties, as well as during national memorial ceremonies. Departments of the State Council or of people's governments of province-level divisions are to report to the State Council in flying the flag half-mast in these cases, as well as for flying half-mast for those who have made outstanding contributions to the PRC or to the cause of world peace or human progress.

=== Prohibition of desecration ===
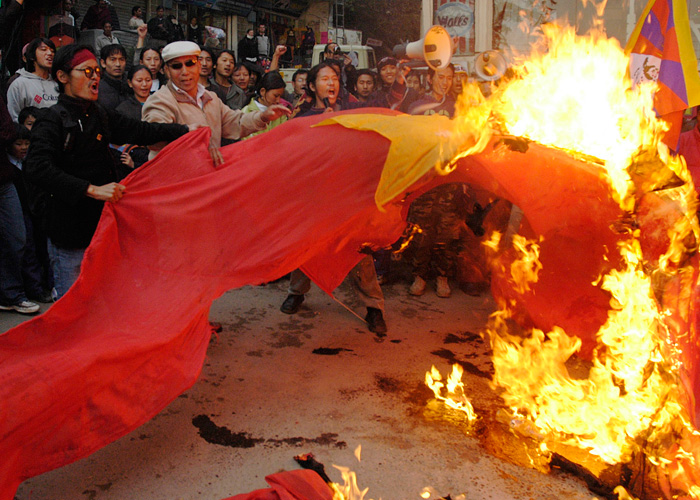
Chinese flag being burned at a pro-Tibet protest

Flag desecration is prohibited in China. The Criminal Law of China provides for imprisonment up to three years, criminal detention, public surveillance, or deprivation of political rights for "whoever desecrates the National Flag or the National Emblem of the People's Republic of China by intentionally burning, mutilating, scrawling on, defiling or trampling upon it in a public place". Article 19 of the National Flag Law states that "whoever intentionally insults the national flag of the People's Republic of China in public by burning, damaging, defacing, defiling, or trampling on it shall be investigated for criminal responsibility in accordance with the law; if the circumstances are minor, the public security organs shall impose a detention of not more than 15 days in accordance with the provisions of the Law on Penalties for Administration of Public Security." Some Taiwanese groups have burned the Chinese flag in protest of the PRC government.

==== Hong Kong ====
In Hong Kong, the National Flag Law applies due to the Annex III of the Hong Kong Basic Law, while the use and protection of the national flag has been governed by the National Flag and National Emblem Ordinance. Article 4 of the Ordinance prohibits the display or use of a damaged, soiled, faded, or non-standard national flag. Article 5 stipulates that the national flag must be manufactured in accordance with the specifications listed in the law. Article 6 prohibits the display or use of the national flag or its design in trademarks, advertisements, or private funeral activities. The law states that, if violated without lawful authorization or reasonable excuse, the display of the flag in these circumstances is an offence. The law adds that upon summary conviction, unlawful use in trademarks or advertisements is punishable by a level 5 fine, and unlawful use in private funeral activities is punishable by a level 2 fine. Article 7 stipulates that publicly and intentionally insulting the national flag by burning, damaging, defacing, soiling, or trampling is an offence. it states that upon conviction, the offence is punishable by a level 5 fine and imprisonment for 3 years.

==== Macau ====
In Macau, the National Flag Law applies due to the Annex III of the Macao Basic Law, while the use and protection of the national flag has been governed by Law No. 5/1999. Article 5 of this law stipulates that the national flag or its design shall not be displayed or used in (1) trademarks or advertisements; (2) private funeral activities; or (3) other occasions or places where the Chief Executive restricts or prohibits the display or use of the national flag or its design. Article 9 also stipulates that anyone who publicly insults or disrespects the national symbol by words, actions, dissemination of documents, or other means of communication with the public shall be subject to imprisonment for a maximum of 3 years or a fine of a maximum of 360 days. Article 11 of the law states that anyone who violates Article 5 may be fined.

== History ==
=== Qing dynasty ===
The first national flag of China was the "Yellow Dragon Flag" used by the Qing dynasty — the last imperial dynasty in Chinese history — from 1862 until the overthrow of the monarchy during the 1911 Revolution. Not initially intended as a national flag (it was used on official occasions and to identify official Chinese ships), it was used as a makeshift national flag during the 1868 Burlingame expedition. The flag that was adopted in 1862 was triangular, but the dynasty adopted a rectangular version of the dragon flag in 1889. The changes to the flag made it more compatible with international practices. In the late 1880s, it began to experience use as a national flag, with private persons beginning to use it as a festive symbol during major events such as the emperor or empress dowager's birthdays.

Flags of the Qing dynasty
Flag of the Qing Dynasty (1862–1889)

Flag of the Qing Dynasty (1889–1912)

=== Republic of China ===
The canton (upper corner on the hoist side) originated from the "Blue Sky with a White Sun flag" (青天白日旗; qīngtiān báirì qí) designed by Lu Haodong, a martyr of the 1911 Revolution. In 1895, he presented his design to represent the revolutionary army at the inauguration of the Revive China Society, an anti-Qing society in Hong Kong. This design was later adopted as the Kuomintang party flag and the Coat of Arms of the Republic of China. The "red Earth" portion was added by Sun Yat-sen in the winter of 1906, bringing the flag to its modern form. According to George Yeo, the then Foreign Minister of Singapore in 2011, in those days, the Blue Sky with a White Sun flag was sewn in the Sun Yat Sen Nanyang Memorial Hall (formerly known as the "Sun Yat Sen Villa") in Singapore by Teo Eng Hock and his wife.

During the Wuchang Uprising in 1911 that led to the formation of the Republic, the various revolutionary armies had different flags. Lu Hao-tung's "Blue Sky with a White Sun" flag was used in the provinces of Guangdong, Guangxi, Yunnan, and Guizhou. In Wuhan, a flag with 18 yellow stars was used to represent the 18 administrative divisions at the time. In Shanghai and northern China, a "Five-Colored Flag" (五色旗; wǔ sè qí) (Five Races Under One Union flag) was used of five horizontal stripes representing the five major nationalities of China: the Han (red), the Manchu (yellow), the Mongol (blue), the Hui (white), and the Tibetan (black). When the government of the Republic of China was established on 1 January 1912, the "Five-Colored Flag" was selected by the provisional Senate as the national flag. The "18-Star Flag" was adopted by the army and the modern flag was adopted as a naval ensign. Sun Yat-sen, however, did not consider the five-colored flag appropriate, reasoning that horizontal order implied a hierarchy or class like that which existed during dynastic times. After President Yuan Shikai assumed dictatorial powers in 1913 by dissolving the National Assembly and outlawing the Kuomintang, Sun Yat-sen established a government-in-exile in Tokyo and employed the Blue Sky with a White Sun flag as the national ROC flag. He continued using this design when the Kuomintang established a rival government in Guangzhou in 1917. The Blue Sky with a White Sun flag was made the official national flag on 17 December 1928 after the Northern Expedition that overthrew the Beijing government. In 1928, Chinese warlord Zhang Xueliang announced that all banners of the Beiyang government in Manchuria would be replaced by the Blue Sky with a White Sun flag, thus nominally uniting China under one government.

During the Second Sino-Japanese War, Japan established a variety of puppet governments using several flag designs. The "Reformed Government", established in March 1938 in Nanjing, employed the Five-Colored Flag. When Wang Jingwei was slated to take over the Japanese-installed government in Nanjing in 1940, he demanded to use the modern flag as a means to challenge the authority of the Nationalist government in Chongqing under Chiang Kai-shek and position himself as the rightful successor to Sun Yat-sen. However, the Japanese preferred the Five-Colored flag. As a compromise, the Japanese suggested adding a triangular yellow pennant on top with the slogan "Peace, Anticommunism, National Construction" (和平反共建國; Hépíng fǎngòng jiàn guó) in black, but this was rejected by Wang. In the end, Wang and the Japanese agreed that the yellow banner was to be used outdoors only until 1943, when the banner was abandoned, leaving two rival governments with the same flag, each claiming to be the legitimate national government of China.

The design of the ROC flag was included in the 1946 constitution. After the Chinese Civil War in 1949, the ROC government led by Chiang Kai-shek relocated its government and its institutions to the island of Taiwan. On the mainland, CCP forces of Mao Zedong established the People's Republic of China (PRC) and adopted a new national flag. On 23 October 1954, the National Emblem and National Flag of the Republic of China Act (中華民國國徽國旗法; Zhōnghuá Mínguó guóhuī guóqífǎ) was promulgated by the Legislative Yuan to specify the size, measure, ratio, production, and management of the flag.

Flags of the Republic of China
"Five races under one union" flag. Used by the Beiyang government (1912–1928).

Flag of the Republic of China of the Nationalist government (flown only in Taiwan after 1949).

=== People's Republic of China ===
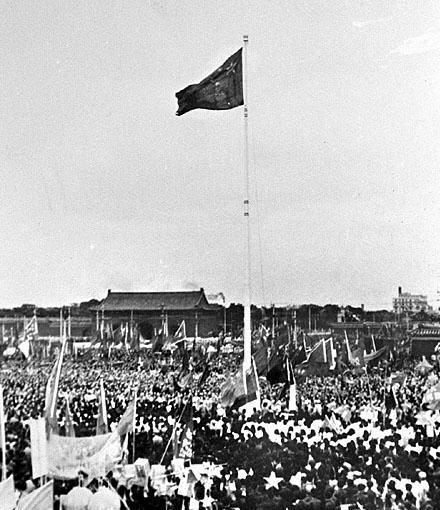
The flag of the People's Republic of China is raised for the first time on 1 October 1949

On 4 July 1949, the sixth working group of the Preparatory Committee of the New Political Consultative Conference created a notice to submit designs for the national flag. After subsequent revisions, the notice was published in the papers People's Daily, Beiping Liberation News, Xinmin News, Dazhong Daily, Guangming Daily, Jinbu Daily and Tianjin Daily during the period 15–26 July. The list of requirements for the national flag were also posted in the notice:

1. Chinese characteristics (geography, nationality, history, culture, etc.);
2. Power characteristics (people's democratic government, led by the working class and based on the worker-peasant alliance);
3. The shape should be rectangular and the length-breadth ratio should be 3:2;
4. The color should mainly be bright red (an early draft of the notice had the color as dark red, but this was changed to bright red by Zhou Enlai).

Zeng Liansong, a citizen from Wenzhou, Zhejiang, was working in Shanghai when the announcement came out; he wanted to create a flag design to express his patriotic enthusiasm for the new country. In the middle of July, he sat down in his attic over the course of several nights to come up with designs. His inspiration for the current design came from observing how stars shine in the night sky. He thusly thought of a Chinese proverb, "longing for the stars, longing for the moon" (盼星星盼月亮, pàn xīngxīng pàn yuèliàng), which shows yearning. He viewed the CCP as the great savior (大救星, dà jiùxīng "great saving star") of the Chinese people, symbolized by the flag's largest star. The idea for four small stars came from "On the People's Democratic Dictatorship", a speech by Mao Zedong, which defined the Chinese people as consisting of four social classes, also traditionally referred to in Asian cultures as the four occupations (士農工商, shì nóng gōng shāng) ("Scholars, Peasants, Workers, Merchants"). The color yellow implies that China belongs to the Chinese people, a "yellow race". After working out the details of the placement of the stars and their sizes (he had tried to put all of the stars in the center, but thought this too dull), he sent his "Five Stars on a Field of Red" (紅地五星旗, hóng de wǔxīng qí) design to the committee in the middle of August.

By 20 August, around 3,000 designs had been sent to the flag committee, including input from committee members themselves such as Guo Moruo and Tan Kah Kee. From 16 to 20 August, the designs were viewed at the Beijing Hotel and culled down to a list of 38. These designs are collected into a book named A Reference of National Flag Designs (國旗圖案參考資料). This book was then submitted to the newly established Chinese People's Political Consultative Conference (CPPCC) for further discussion. However, Zeng's design was not included until Tian Han nominated it again.

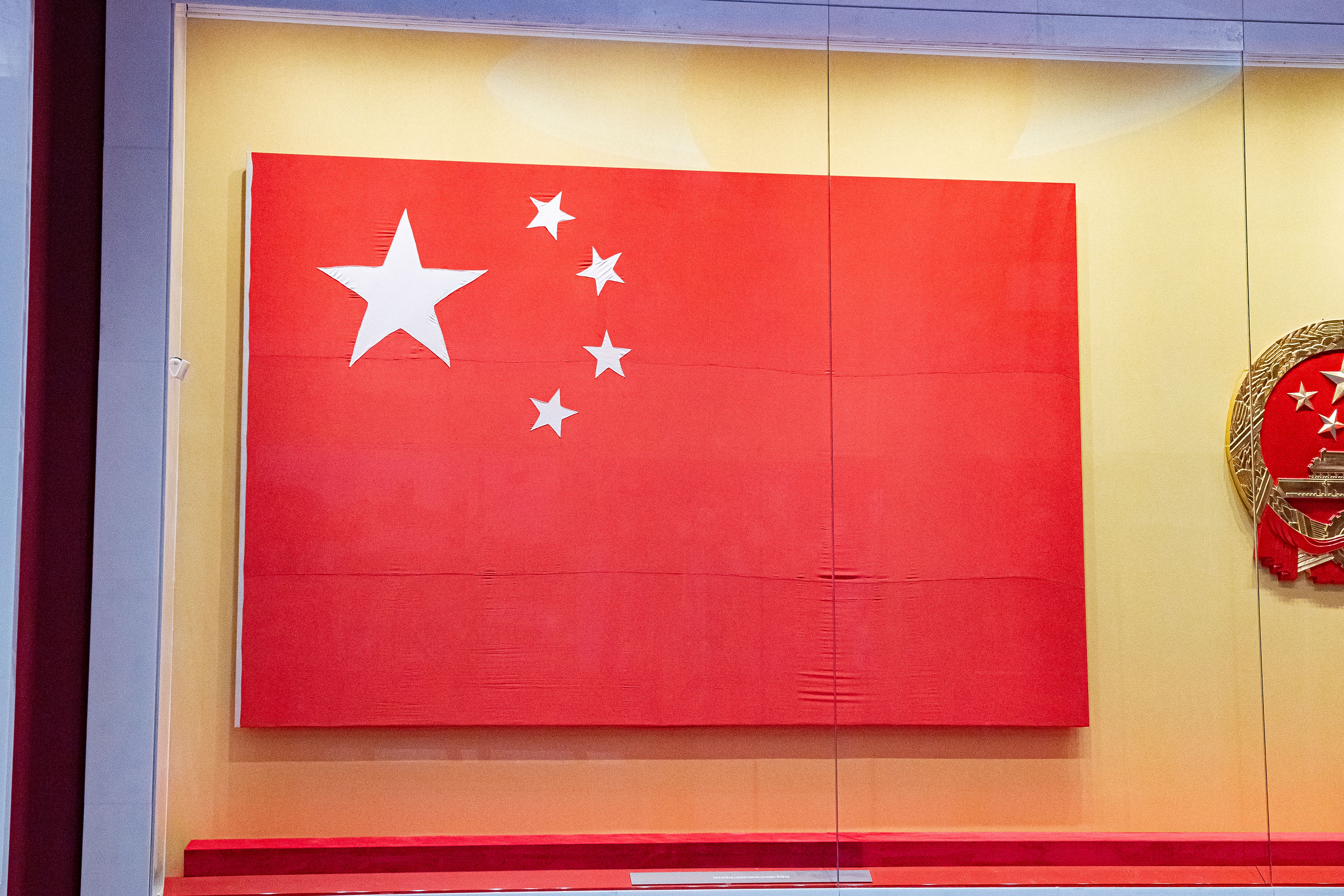
The first national flag raised at the founding ceremony of the People's Republic of China housed in the Museum of the Communist Party of China.

On the morning of 23 September, the representatives of the CPPCC discussed the national flags, but came to no conclusion. Some disliked the symbolism which Zeng attached to the four smaller stars, and said it should not include the bourgeoisie. The design Mao and others liked had a giant golden star in the corner on a red flag that was charged with a golden horizontal bar. But this design was strongly opposed by Zhang Zhizhong, who saw the golden bar as symbolizing China being divided into two. That night, Peng Guanghan (彭光涵) recommended Zeng's design to Zhou Enlai. Zhou was satisfied with it and asked for the creation of a larger copy of the design. Tan Kah Kee also advised Mao and Zhou that the power characteristics take precedence over Chinese geography characteristics, so there was no need to insist on the golden bar that symbolized the Yellow River. Two days later, Mao had a meeting in his office about the flag. He persuaded everyone to adopt Zeng's design, with some slight modifications. According to earlier discussions at the Beijing Hotel, the hammer and sickle from Zeng's original design was removed since it was similar to the flag of the Soviet Union. On 27 September 1949, Zeng's modified design was selected unanimously by the First Plenary Session of CPPCC, which changed the flag's name to "Five-star Red Flag".

On 29 September, the new flag was published in the People's Daily, so the design could be copied by other local authorities. The flag was officially unveiled and raised for the first time by Mao Zedong in Beijing's Tiananmen Square on 1 October 1949, at the formal announcement of the People's Republic of China. The first flag flown over Tiananmen Square was sewn together by Zhao Wenrui (赵文瑞), a seamstress who finished the task around 1 pm on 30 September. Zeng had a hard time believing that his design was picked, due to the missing hammer and sickle from the giant star. However, he was officially congratulated by the General Office of the Central People's Government as the designer of the flag and received 500 yuan for his work. On 27 September 1954, the 1st National People's Congress adopted the first Constitution of the People's Republic of China, which established the "Five-star Red Flag" as the national flag of China.

Rejected designs of the Five-star Red Flag
The original design submitted by Zeng Liansong

The "Yellow River" flag design originally preferred by Mao Zedong

Proposal 2 for the PRC flag

Proposal 3 for the PRC flag

Proposal 4 for the PRC flag
Other rejected proposed designs
Proposal by Xiao Shufang

Proposal by Wu Yuzhang

Proposal by Ai Qing

Proposal by Zhu De

Proposal by Liang Congjie

Proposal by Guo Moruo

Proposal by Guo Moruo

== Flags of the Special Administrative Regions ==
Flags of the Special Administrative Regions of Hong Kong and Macau

Due to an order passed by the CCP Central Committee General Office and General Office of the State Council in 1997, cities and provinces are not allowed to adopt their own symbols. However, both of the special administrative regions of Hong Kong and Macau have their own special flags. The precise use of the SAR flags are regulated by laws passed by the National People's Congress.

The regional flag (Hong Kong) displayed with the national flag

The Flag of the Hong Kong Special Administrative Region features a stylized, white, five-petal Bauhinia blakeana flower in the center of a red field. On each petal is a red star; they symbolize Hong Kong's status under China, while the overall flag design signifies the reestablished link between postcolonial Hong Kong and China while demonstrating the "one country, two systems" political principle applied to the region. The flag of Hong Kong was adopted on 16 February 1990. On 10 August 1996, it received formal approval from the Preparatory Committee, a group which advised the People's Republic of China (PRC) on Hong Kong's transfer of sovereignty from the United Kingdom to the PRC in 1997. The flag was first officially hoisted on 1 July 1997, in the handover ceremony marking the transfer of sovereignty from the United Kingdom to China.

The Regional flag of the Macau Special Administrative Region is "Macau green" with a lotus flower above a stylized image of the Governor Nobre de Carvalho Bridge and water in white, beneath an arc of five gold, five-pointed stars: one large star in the center of the arc and four smaller ones. The lotus was chosen as the floral emblem of Macau. The Governor Nobre de Carvalho Bridge is a bridge linking the Macau Peninsula and the island of Taipa. The bridge is one of the most recognizable landmarks of the territory. The water beneath the lotus and the bridge symbolize Macau's position as a port and its role played in the territory. The five five-pointed stars echo the design of the national flag, symbolizing the relationship Macau has with its mother country. The design was chosen on 15 January 1993 by a committee that was drafting the Basic Law for the Macau SAR and was formally adopted by the Macau SAR Preparatory Committee on 16 January 1999. The flag was first officially hoisted on 20 December 1999, in the handover ceremony marking the transfer of sovereignty from Portugal to China.

== Military flags ==
There are nine flags that are used by the People's Liberation Army (PLA), as well as one used by the People's Armed Police. The main feature of these flags is a golden star at the top left corner and two Chinese characters "八一" to the right of the star, all placed on a red background. The characters "八一" (literally "eight one") pay homage to the events on 1 August 1927 (8th month, 1st day); this was when the PLA was created by the CCP to start their rebellion against the Kuomintang Government in Nanchang. The main flag of the PLA was created on 15 June 1949 by a decree issued from Mao. The flag has a ratio of 5 by 4, which has a white sleeve measuring 1/16 of the flag's length. For ceremonies, a PLA flag with golden fringe is placed on a pole with gold and red spiral stripes and topped with a golden finial and red tassel. Each branch of the PLA, the Ground Forces, Navy, Air Force, Rocket Force, Aerospace Force, Cyberspace Force, Information Support Force and the Joint Logistics Support Force, also have their own flags to use. In a 1992 order, the flags of the three branches were defined. The top 5/8 of the flags is the same as the PLA flag; the bottom 3/8 are occupied by the colors of the branches. The flag of the Ground Forces has a forest green bar at the bottom, the naval ensign has stripes of blue and white at the bottom, the Air Force uses a sky blue bar and the Rocket Force uses a yellow bar at the bottom. The forest green represents the earth, the blue and white stripes represent the seas, the sky blue represents the air and the yellow represents the flare of missile launching. On 10 January 2018, the People's Armed Police received a new flag following the design of the PLA branch flags with three olive stripes at the bottom.

Military flags
People's Liberation Army

Ground Force

Navy

Air Force

Rocket Force

Aerospace Force

Cyberspace Force

Information Support Force

Joint Logistics Support Force

People's Armed Police

== Communist Party flags ==
After the CCP was founded in 1921, various sections of the party made flags based on what the Bolsheviks used, producing various designs and patterns. On 28 April 1942, the CCP issued a decree announcing current flag and the pattern it should follow. The design was further defined in the CCP Constitution in 1996. The flag has a red background with a golden hammer and sickle, the CCP emblem, at the top left corner. The flag ratio is defined as two by three (24×36 units); the size of the emblem is eight units square, placed four units away from the hoist and three units away from the top of the flag.

The flag of the Communist Youth League of China was adopted on 4 May 1950. The design of the flag consists of the group emblem, a golden star surrounded by a ring of gold, charged on a red field. The flag is constructed by making the top hoist portion of the flag into twelve by eighteen units, placing the emblem in the middle of that rectangle. The radius of the emblem is four units.

The Young Pioneers of China currently uses two flags. The first flag is for pioneer battalions. The length of this flag is 90 centimeters (35 in); its width,120 centimeters (47 in). A golden badge of the Young Pioneers is placed in the center of the flag. However, for a company, a second, modified flag is used. The flag has a length of 60 centimeters (24 in) and a width of 80 centimeters (31 in). A 20 centimeters (7.9 in) triangle is cut out of the fly edge of the flag and the golden emblem is shifted closer towards the hoist.

Organizational flags
Chinese Communist Party

Communist Youth League of China

Young Pioneers of China (Pioneer Battalions)

Young Pioneers of China (Pioneer Companies)

== Customs flag ==
Customs flag of China

The customs flag is the Chinese national flag with the emblem of customs at the lower right corner, which consists of a golden key and the Caduceus of Hermes, crossing each other. The current customs flag was officially adopted on 1 October 1953. The customs flag should be hung at the bow of the customs vessel.

== Gallery ==
Flags in use
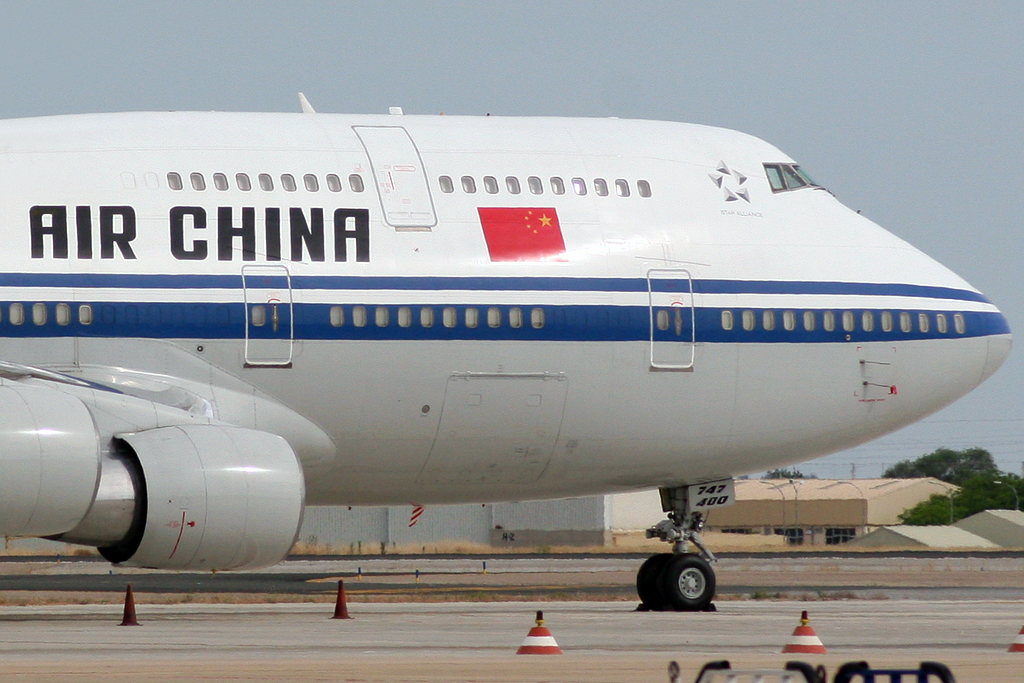
The Chinese flag on an Air China Boeing 747-400.

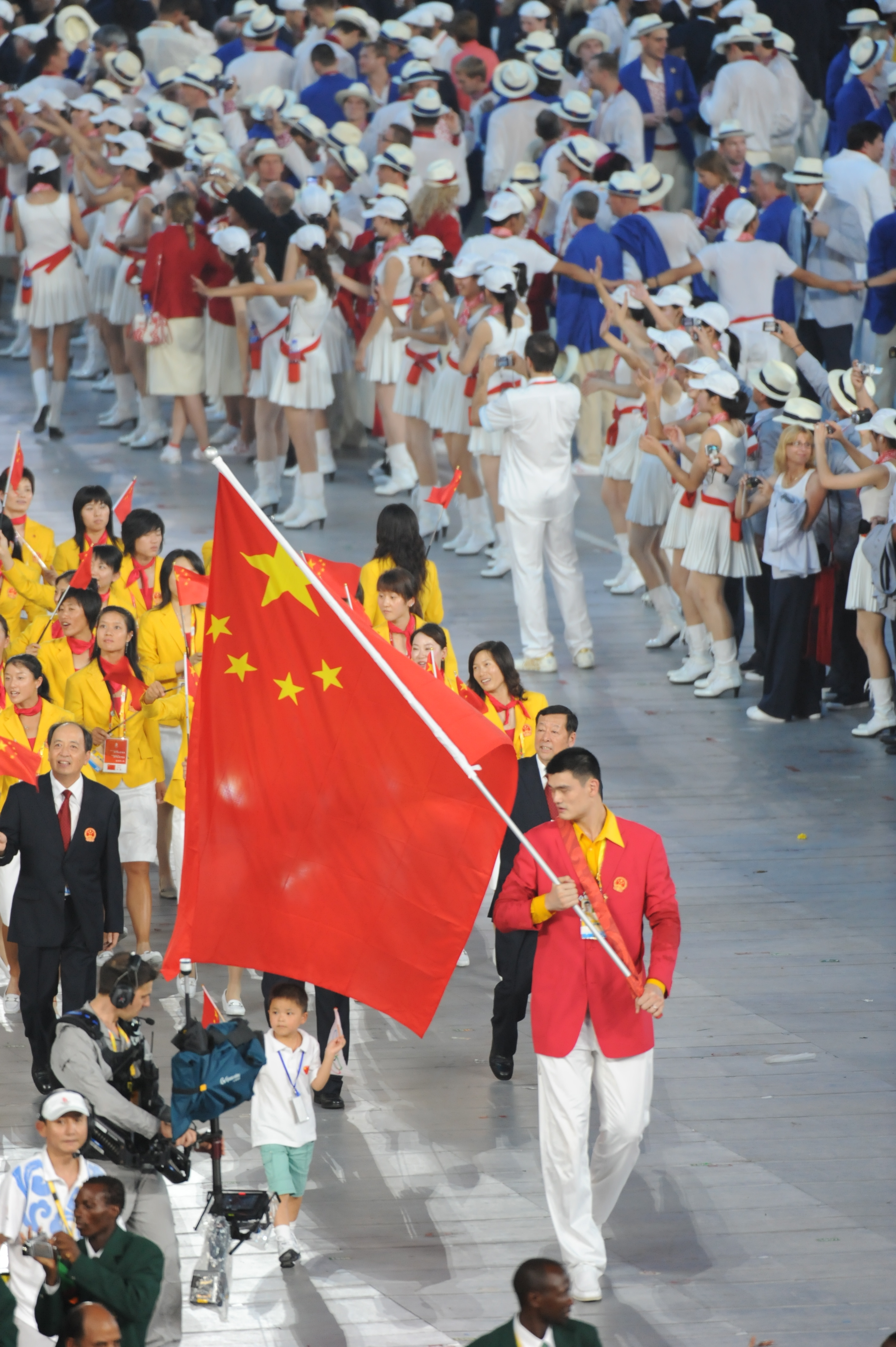
Yao Ming holding the Chinese flag during the 2008 Summer Olympics Parade of Nations.

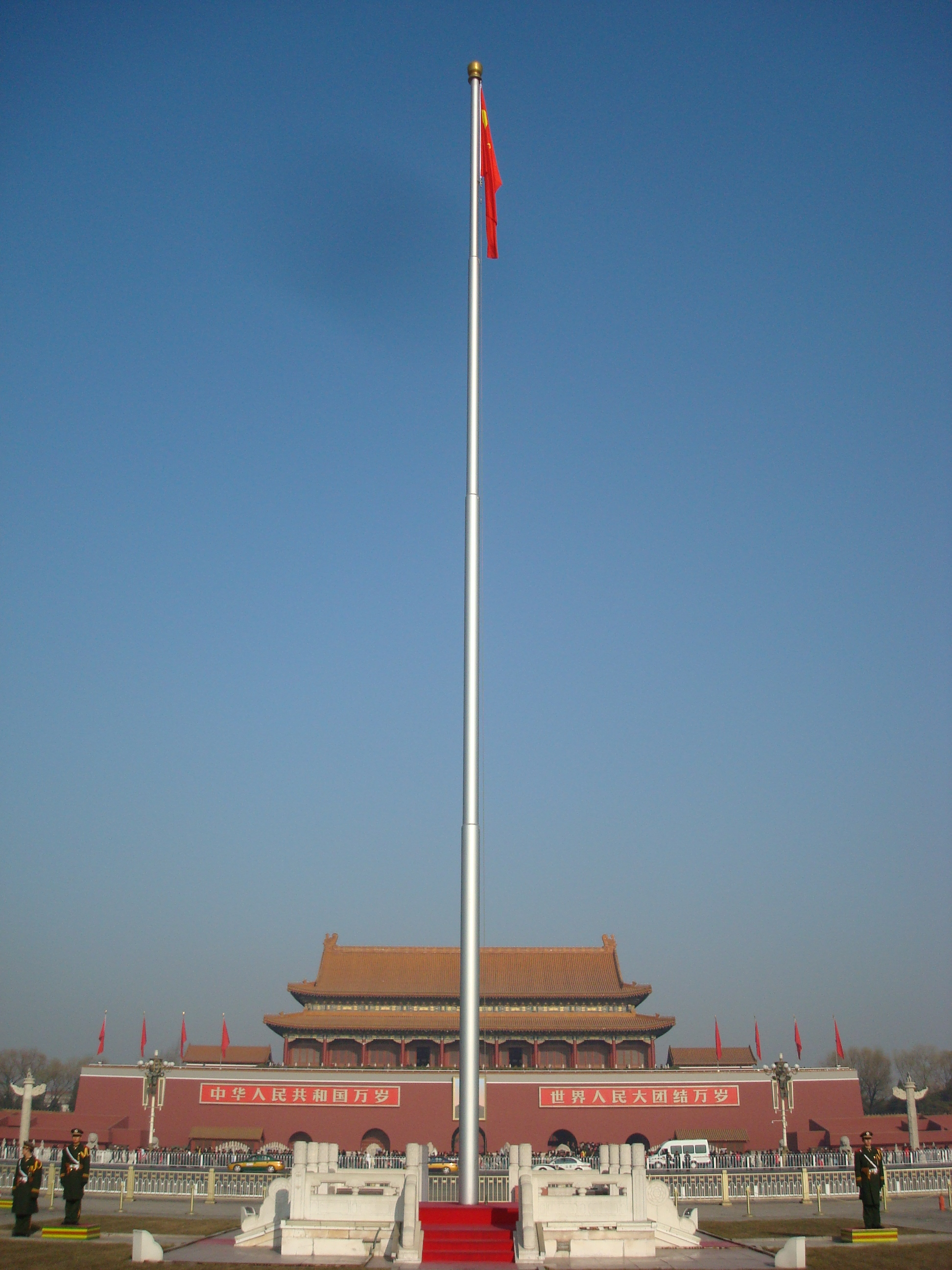
The Chinese flag flying in the middle of Tiananmen Square.

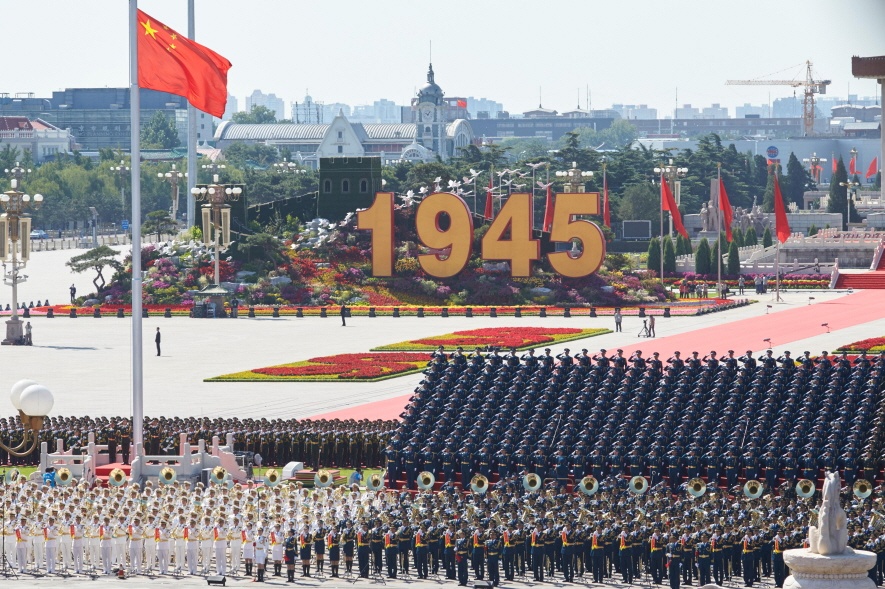
Flag of China flying in the 2015 Victory Day Parade.

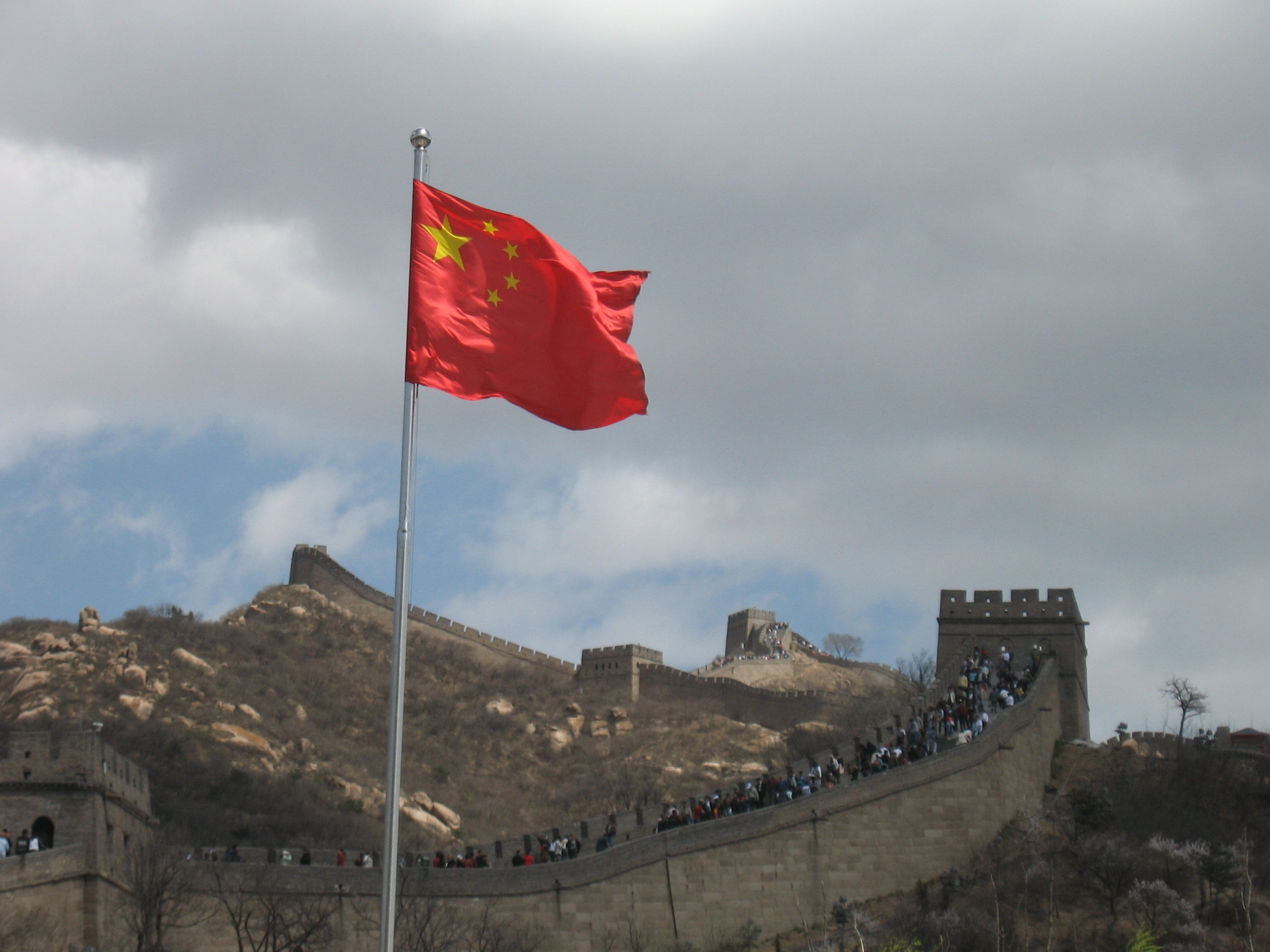
The flag of China flown on the Great Wall of China.

== See also ==
- National emblem of China
- List of Chinese flags
- March of the Volunteers

== Notes ==
1. Chinese: 五星红旗; pinyin: Wǔxīng Hóngqí
