= 2007 Macau transfer of sovereignty anniversary protest =

Anti-government protest in Macau

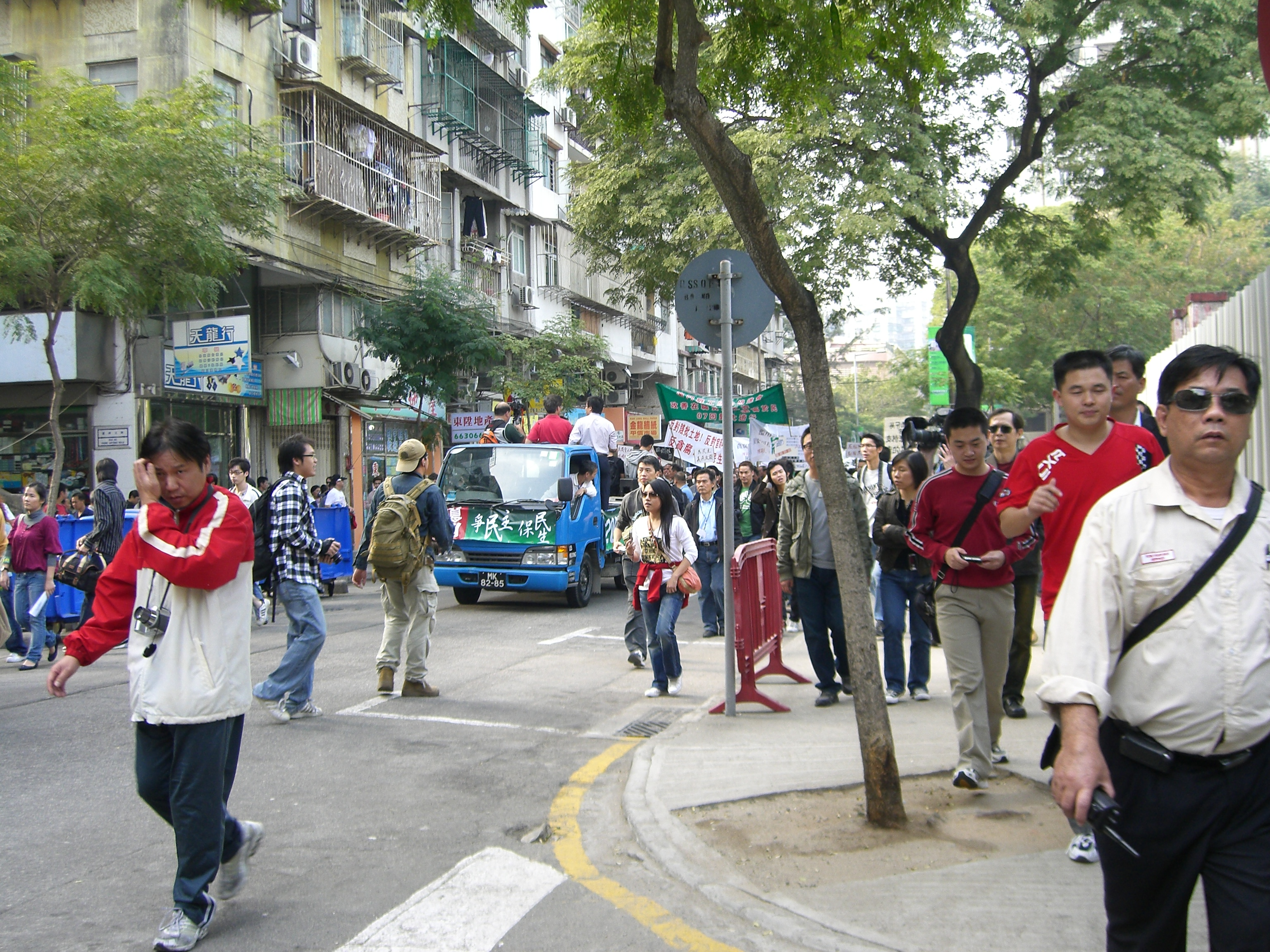
Protesters take it to the streets

The 2007 Macau transfer of sovereignty anniversary protest (2007年澳門民主回歸大遊行) was an anti-government protest that took place on December 20, 2007, in the Macau Special Administrative Region of the People's Republic of China. The event coincided with the 8th anniversary of the transfer of sovereignty over Macau that took place on the same date in 1999.

== Protest ==
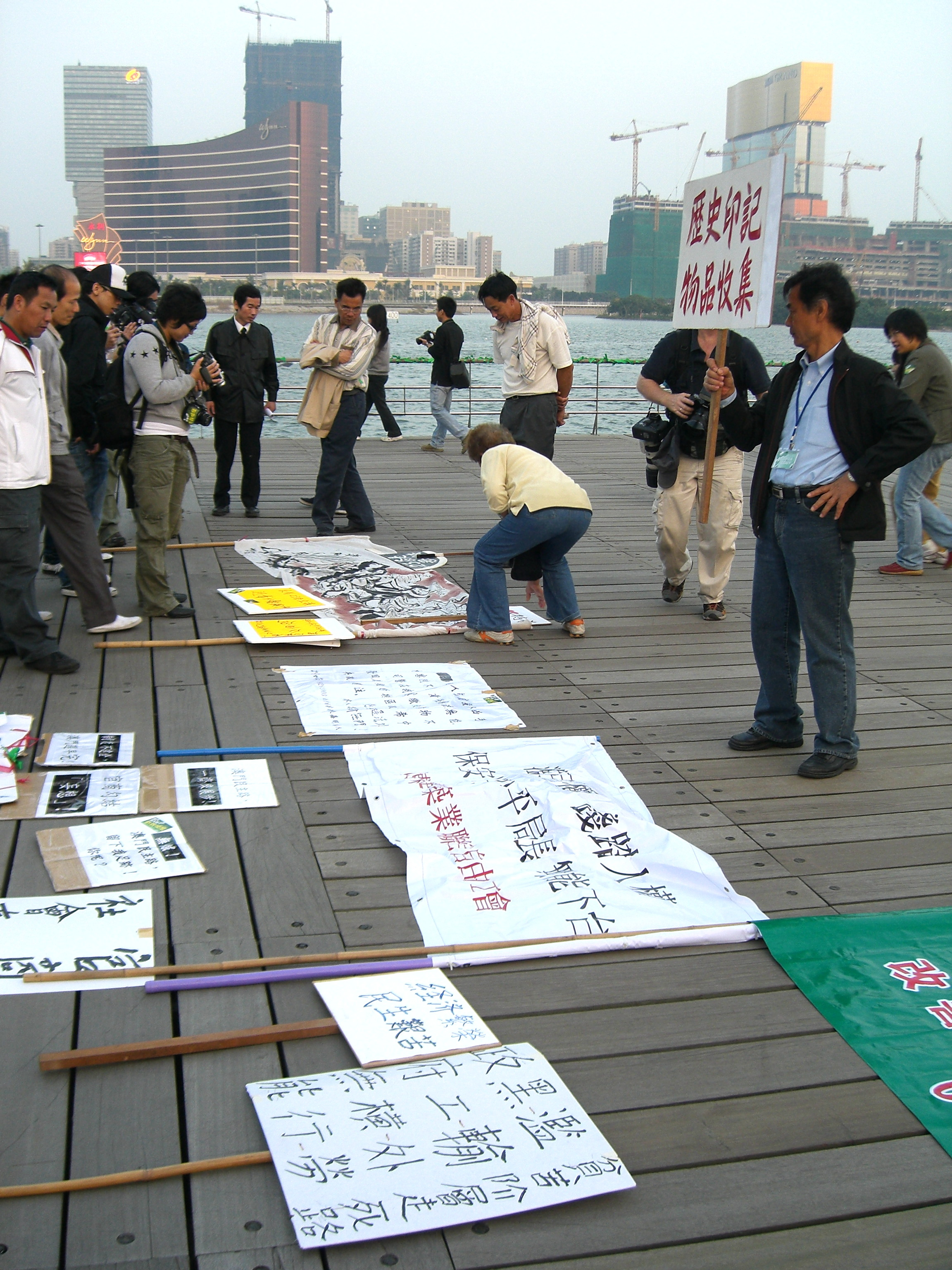
Sign preparations

Earlier in the year a large scale labour protest turned violent in May. This protest also followed one of the largest corruption case involving Ao Man-long of the Macau public works just a month before in November. Macau's leaders in 2007 were chosen by a 300-member committee of mostly Beijing loyalists. Only 12 of the city's 29 legislators are directly elected, while the rest are chosen by the leader and interest groups.

The December protest used the slogan "oppose corrupt government, fight for democracy, protect people's livelihood, rebuild Macau's values, reestablish the memory of this generation." (反貪腐、爭民主、保民生，重建澳門的價值，共創我們這一代的集體記憶). About 1,000 residents of Macau held a march to demand full democracy and protest against corruption. Police blocked off roads and kept close tabs on the protesters.

== See also ==
- 2007 Macau labour protest
