= On the People's Democratic Dictatorship =

1949 speech by Chinese leader Mao Zedong

"On the People's Democratic Dictatorship" (simplified Chinese: 论人民民主专政; traditional Chinese: 論人民民主專政) is a speech which was written by Mao Zedong. It was presented to the public on 30 June 1949, twenty-eight years after the founding of the Chinese Communist Party (CCP). This speech is part of the fourth volume collection of his works, which was published by the Foreign Languages Press in Beijing. It is noteworthy for its tone, that it preceded the freeze in Sino-Soviet relations following the Sino-Soviet split and adoption of Maoism in China, and that it codifies and embraces people's democratic dictatorship.
