= 35th anniversary of the People's Republic of China =

1984 celebrations in China

The 35th Anniversary of the Founding of The People's Republic of China 庆祝中华人民共和国成立35周年大会
- Genre: Military parade, mass pageant, music and dance gala
- Date: 1 October 1984
- Frequency: Select years (Note: Since the founding of the people's republic until 2009, the country has held 14 National Day grand military parades in 1949–1959, 1984, 1999, and 2009.)
- Locations: Chang'an Avenue, Tiananmen Square, Beijing, China
- Coordinates: 39°54′26.4″N 116°23′27.9″E
- Previous event: 30th anniversary of the People's Republic of China
- Next event: 40th anniversary of the People's Republic of China
- Participants: PLA, PAP, the Militia, and other formations
- Leader: Deng Xiaoping (chairman)
- People: Qin Jiwei (chief commander of the military parade)

The 35th anniversary of the founding of the People's Republic of China (Chinese: 庆祝中华人民共和国成立35周年大会) was marked on 1 October 1984 with a military parade followed by a mass civilian parade in Tiananmen Square, Beijing, and with celebrations across the country. It was the first National Day military parade in 25 years and the first at which China displayed domestically built weapons, including its intercontinental ballistic missiles. China's paramount leader Deng Xiaoping reviewed the troops along Chang'an Avenue and gave a holiday address that called for peaceful reunification with Taiwan.

== Parade ==
In mid-November 1983, the Secretariat of the Central Committee of the Chinese Communist Party decided to hold a military parade for the following year's National Day; the parade leadership group and headquarters were established that December, and Yang Dezhi, the PLA Chief of the General Staff, headed the working group. It was the first National Day military parade in 25 years, since the 10th anniversary of the People's Republic of China in 1959; a parade planned for the 30th anniversary in 1979 had been scrapped after the Cultural Revolution and the death of Mao Zedong. The celebration was the first live Chinese television broadcast carried in the United States, through a joint venture between China Central Television and PBS. The parade was commanded by General Qin Jiwei in his position as Commander of the Beijing Military Region. It marked the first time that someone other than the Minister of National Defense had inspected a National Day parade and the only time that a paramount leader who wasn't in a state or party position had inspected the parade. During the inspection, set to the march The People's Navy Marches Forward, the traditional greeting Long live the Chinese Communist Party and the response Long live the People's Republic of China were replaced with Comrades, you have worked hard! and the reply Serve the people!, to distinguish the event from Maoist-era parades. (Note: The greeting 首长好 had been used during troop inspections since the time of Mao Zedong; since 2017, 主席好 has been used when the Chairman of the Central Military Commission (the president and general secretary) inspects.)

An excerpt of Deng's holiday address

We want peaceful reunification with Taiwan, which is part of our sacred territory. Our policy in this regard is also known to all and will not change. The desire for peaceful reunification of the motherland is taking hold in the hearts of the entire Chinese nation. It is an irresistible trend, and sooner or later it will become a reality. We hope that the people of all our nationalities, including our compatriots in Hong Kong, Macao and Taiwan and those residing abroad, will work together for its early realization.

— Deng Xiaoping

It also marked the debut appearance of the regular honor guard companies and the color guard of the Beijing Garrison Honor Guard Battalion, which are the first to be inspected and march past dignitaries. Some 10,370 officers and soldiers took part, organised into 42 ground divisions and four airborne echelons. A group of Peking University students raised a banner made from bedsheets reading "Hello Xiaoping" (小平您好; Xiǎopíng nín hǎo), to which Deng responded with a smile and a wave. In an interview with the People's Daily two days later, Defence Minister Zhang Aiping was quoted as saying "The people of the whole country and all the men and officers of the Army saw with their own eyes that the troop were much better equipped", referring to the military technology and armaments that were showcased. as it was the first to showcase Chinese made equipment.

=== Leaders in attendance ===
1. Hu Yaobang (General Secretary of the CCP)
2. Deng Xiaoping (CMC chairman and Advisory chairman)
3. Zhao Ziyang (Premier, official master of ceremonies)
4. Li Xiannian (President of China)
5. Chen Yun, First Secretary of the Central Commission for Discipline Inspection
- Other CCP Politburo members
- Deng Yingchao (widow of Zhou Enlai)
- Li Ximing (Party Committee Secretary of Beijing)
- Peng Zhen, Chairman of the Standing Committee of the National People's Congress
- Deng Yingchao, Chairwoman of the National Committee of the Chinese People's Political Consultative Conference
- Ulanhu, Vice President
- Xu Xiangqian, the 4th Minister of National Defense
- Nie Rongzhen, the first and only Commander-in-Chief of the PLA
- Prince Norodom Sihanouk
- Son Sann, 22nd Prime Minister of Cambodia
- Khieu Samphan, Chairman of the State Presidium of Democratic Kampuchea
- Hoàng Văn Hoan, former Vietnamese Ambassador

== Order of march ==
The military parade began at 10:29 a.m.

=== Participating units ===
In order of appearance (A bolded unit indicates that this is its first appearance)

- Guard of Honor of the Chinese People's Liberation Army (中国人民解放军三军仪仗队)
- PLA Ground Force Academy Cadet Officers Square Formation (陆军学院方队)
- PLA Navy Academy Cadet Officers Square Formation (海军学院方队)
- PLA Air Force Academy Cadet Officers Square Formation (空军学院方队)
- PLA Artillery Academy Cadet Officers Square Formation (炮兵学院方队)
- PLA Ground Force Army School Square Formation (陆军学校方队)
- PLA Navy Seamen Square Formation (水兵方队)
- PLA Air Force Paratroopers Square Formation (空降兵方队)
- **PLA Female Military Nurses Square Formation** (女卫生兵方队)
- **PAP Armed Police Force Square Formation** (人民武装警察方队)
- **Male Militia Square Formation** (男民兵方队)
- **Female Militia Square Formation** (女民兵方队)

=== Military vehicles ===
- **HJ-8 anti-tank missile system**
- **Type 82 self-propelled 130mm multiple rocket launcher**
- **PHL-81 self-propelled 122mm multiple rocket launcher**
- **Type 84 mine-laying rocket system**
- **Type 83 122mm mortar-howitzer**
- Type 59-1 130mm mortar-howitzer
- **ZSL-93 infantry fighting vehicle**
- **Type 63 armoured personnel carrier**
- **Type 79 main battle tank**
- **Type 70-2 122mm self-propelled howitzer**
- **Type 70 130mm self-propelled rocket launcher**
- **Type 83 152mm self-propelled howitzer**
- **YJ-8 anti-ship missile**
- **HQ-2A medium and short-range anti-aircraft missile**
- **DF-3 medium-range ballistic missile**
- **DF-4 intercontinental ballistic missile**
- **DF-5 intercontinental ballistic missile**

=== Aircraft ===
- **Xian H-6 bomber and tanker**
  - along with **Shenyang JJ-5 fighter**
- **Xian H-6 bomber and tanker**
- **Nanchang Q-5 ground-attack aircraft**
- **Chengdu J-7 fighter**

== Music ==
A 1,200-piece band accompanied the parade.

Welcome leaders

1. Ode to the Motherland (歌唱祖国)
2. March of the Volunteers (National Anthem of the People's Republic of China) (义勇军进行曲)

Troops review

1. Troops Review March of the PLA (Inspection March of the PLA) (检阅进行曲)
2. Three Rules of Discipline and Eight Points for Attention (三大纪律八项注意)
3. People's Navy, Marches Forward (人民海军向前进)
4. Ready to Fly to the Battlefield (随时准备飞向战场)
5. March of the Artillery Force (炮兵进行曲)
6. March of the Motorized Troops (摩托化部队进行曲)
7. March of the Armored Vehicles (战车进行曲)
8. March of the Rocket Forces (火箭部队进行曲)

Military Parade, drive-by, and flyby

1. Parade March of the People's Liberation Army (分列式进行曲)
2. March of the Artillery Force (炮兵进行曲)
3. March of the Motorized Troops (摩托化部队进行曲)
4. March of the Armored Vehicles (战车进行曲)
5. March of the Rocket Forces (火箭部队进行曲)
6. Ready to Fly to the Battlefield (随时准备飞向战场)

Civilian parade

1. Ode to the Motherland (歌唱祖国)
2. On the Field of Hope (在希望的田野上); audio
3. We Workers Have Strength (咱们工人有力量); audio
4. China, China, the Bright Red Sun Never Sets (中国, 中国, 鲜红的太阳永不落); audio
5. March of the Athletes (运动员进行曲)
6. Toast Song (祝酒歌); audio
7. Anthem of the Young Pioneers of China (中国少年先锋队队歌); audio

== Card displays ==
During the civilian parade, participants holding coloured cards and flowers formed five large patterns in turn: the national emblem with the years 1949 and 1984; 祖国万岁 (Zǔguó wànsuì; "Long live the motherland"); 振兴中华 (Zhènxīng Zhōnghuá; "Revitalize China"); 保卫和平 (Bǎowèi hépíng; "Defend peace"); and 中国共产党万岁 (Zhōngguó Gòngchǎndǎng wànsuì; "Long live the Chinese Communist Party").
