= Xinhuamen =

Gate of Zhongnanhai, Beijing, China

Coordinates: 39°54′23″N 116°22′47″E

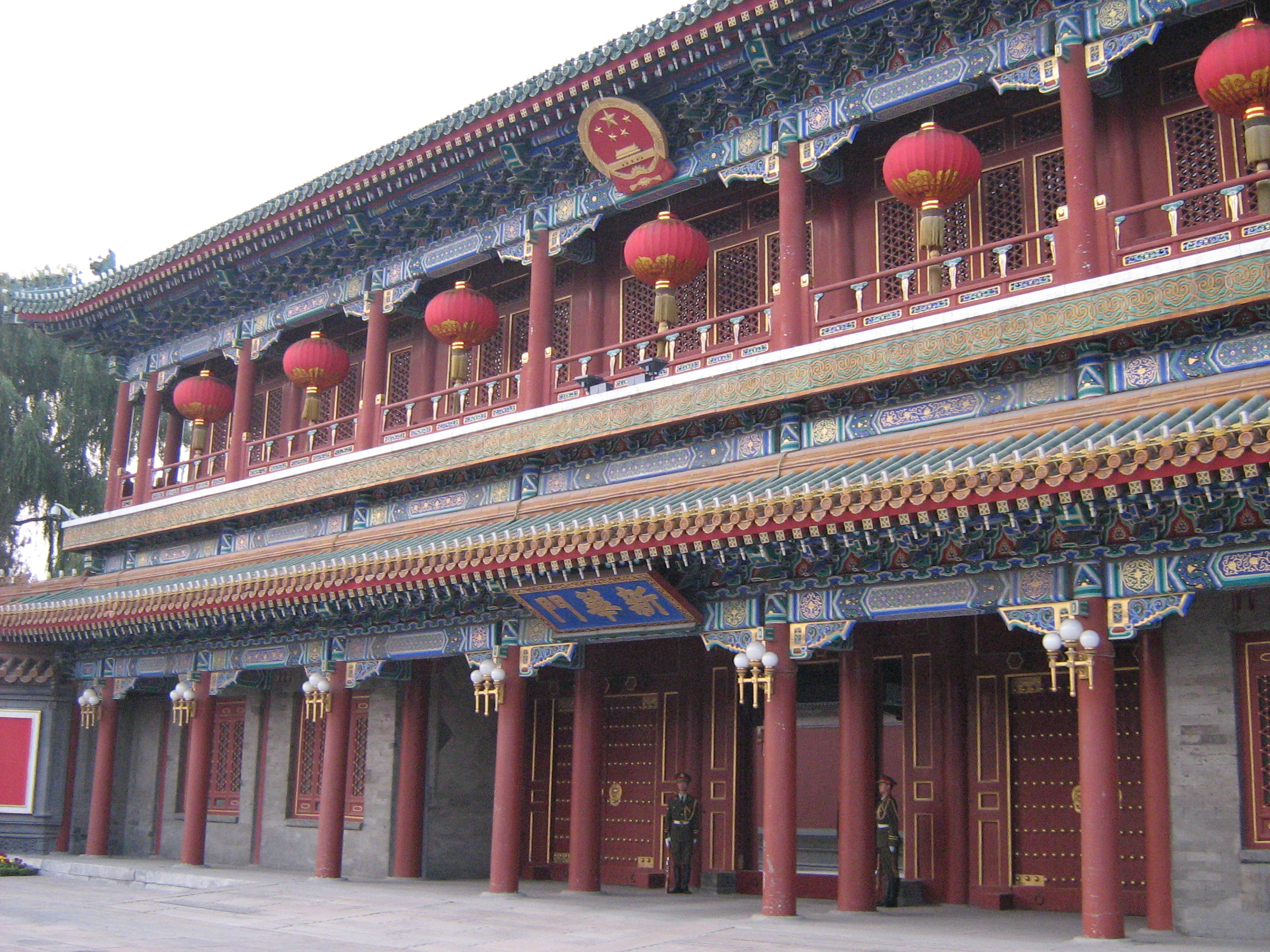
Xinhuamen in 2006

Xinhuamen, also known as Xinhua Gate (simplified Chinese: 新华门; traditional Chinese: 新華門), is the main gate of Zhongnanhai, located on the north side of the middle section of West Chang'an Avenue in Xicheng District, Beijing. Formerly known as Baoyue Tower, it was built in the 23rd year of Qianlong Emperor's reign in the Qing dynasty (1758). In 1913, it was rebuilt as the main gate of the Presidential Palace of the Beiyang government and renamed Xinhua Gate. After the founding of the People's Republic of China, slogans were inlaid on the screen wall and the eight-character walls on both sides, including "Serve the People" written by Mao Zedong.

== History ==
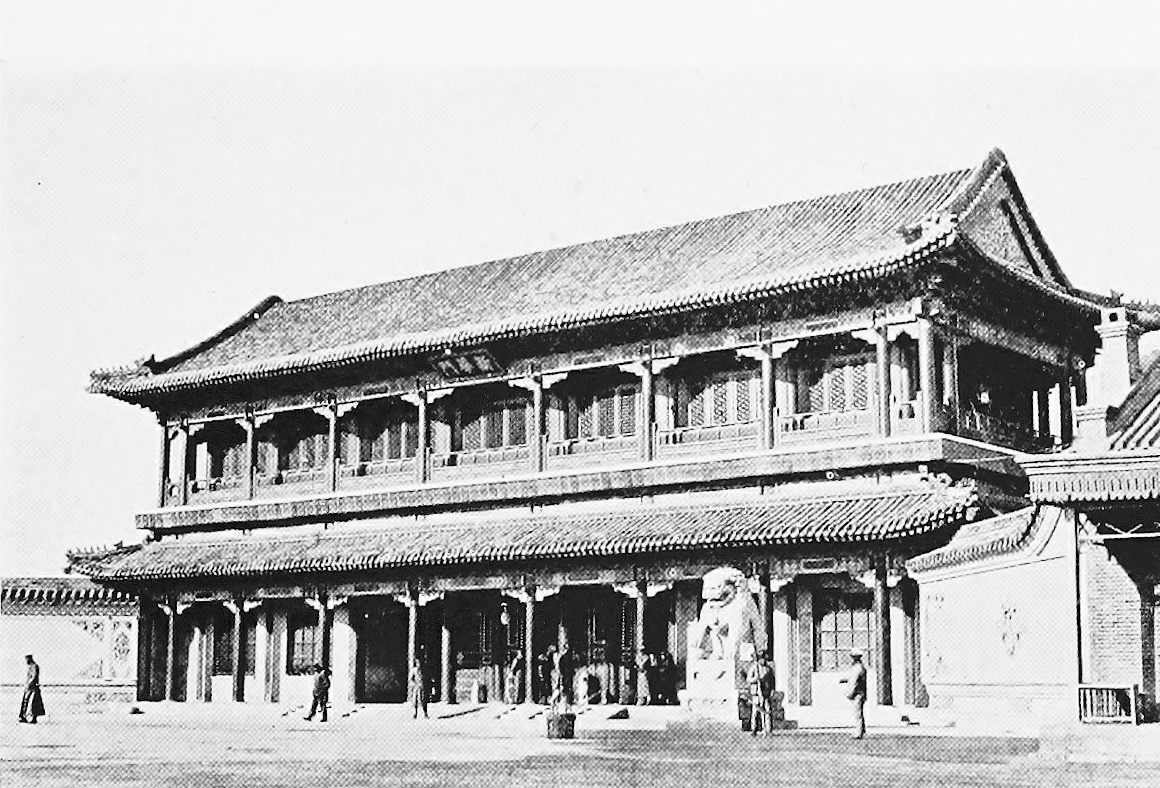
Xinhua Gate between 1917 and 1919, photographed by Gamboa. At that time, the plaque "Xinhua Gate" was hung on the second floor.

Xinhua Gate was originally named Baoyue Tower. It was built in the 23rd year of Emperor Qianlong's reign (1758). In the spring of that year, Emperor Qianlong climbed Yingtai to look south and felt that the south bank of Taiye Lake was empty and without a screen, so he ordered the construction of this tower. Initially, it was planned to be three-story, but later it was considered too extravagant, so it was changed to a two-story building with a width of seven rooms from east to west and a length of two meters from north to south. It was completed in the autumn of the same year. Because the moon was reflected in the pool, the building stood beside the pool, and the pool and the moon were presented in front of the building, it was named "Baoyue Tower". On the top of the building hangs a plaque written by Emperor Qianlong, "Looking up and looking down", as well as couplets such as "Good joy in all four seasons, the picture is presented in the garden; the clear light is shared for thousands of miles, reflecting the center of the pool".

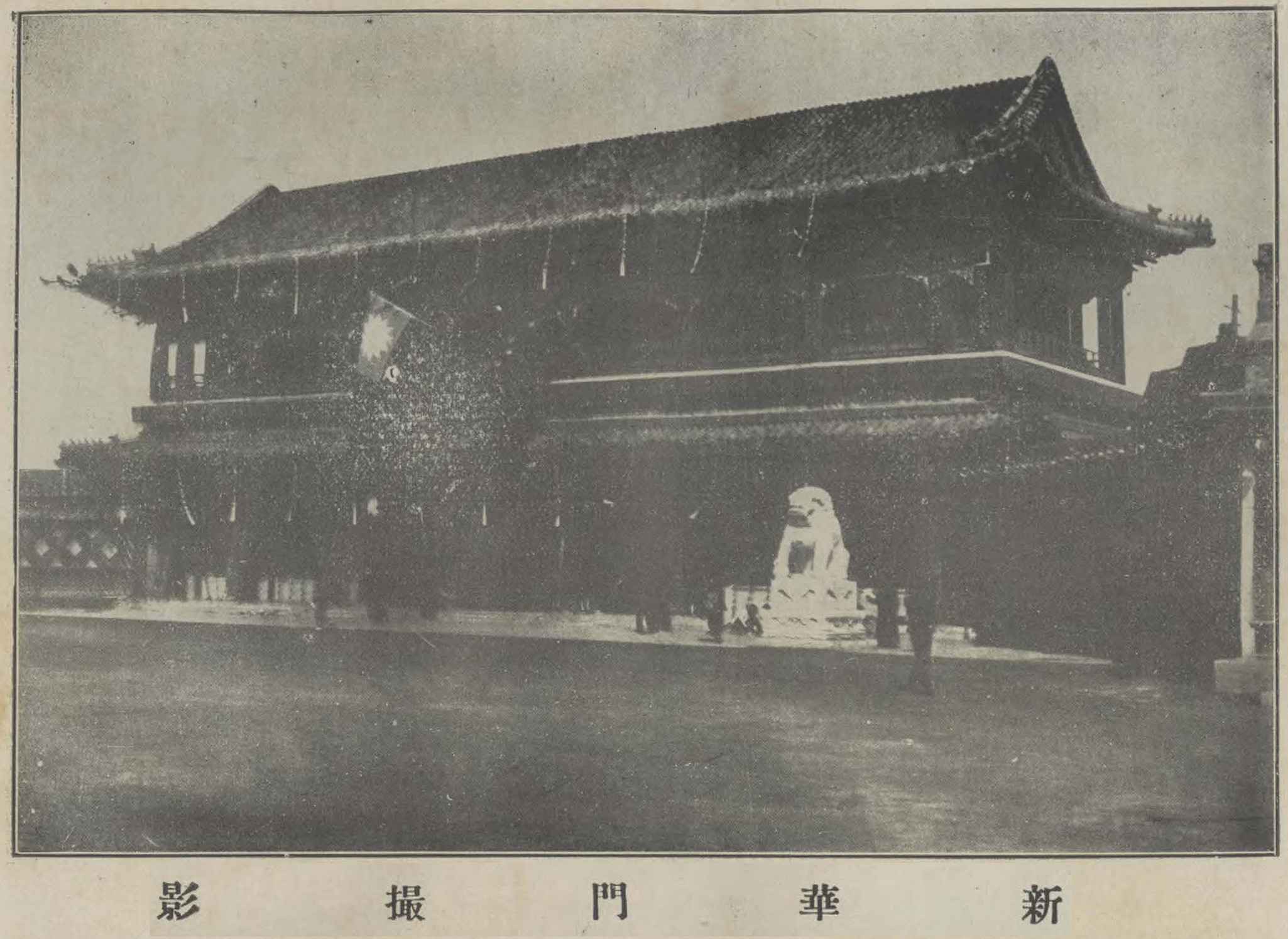
Xinhua Gate in 1914

Baoyue Tower was not connected to the outside world. To its south was the southern wall of the Western Garden (also the imperial city wall), and Baoyue Tower was located inside the wall. To the south of the wall was Huiziying (also known as Huihuiying), where Hui immigrants from the Western Regions lived and built a new mosque (namely Puning Mosque, commonly known as Huihuiying Mosque). Therefore, folk legend has it that Baoyue Tower was built by Emperor Qianlong for Xiangfei. Xiangfei could see the mosque outside the wall when she climbed up the Baoyue Tower, which relieved her homesickness. Based on this legend, folks also referred to Baoyue Tower as Wangxiang Tower.

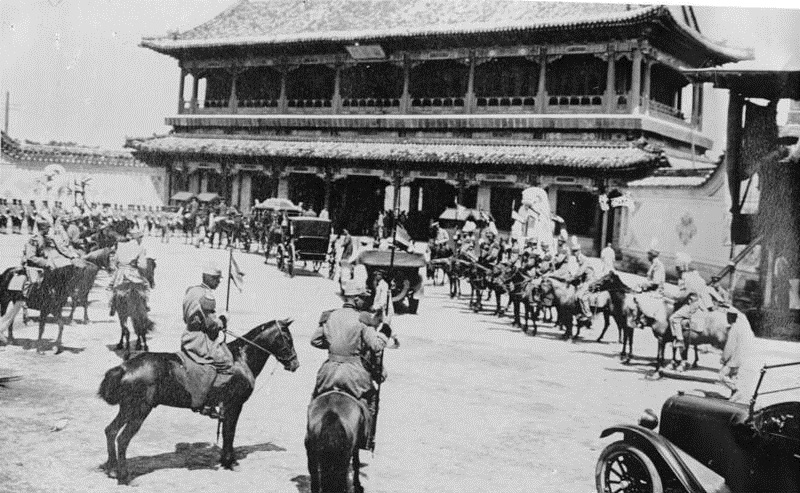
Xinhua Gate during the Beiyang government period in the 1920s. The picture shows Soviet Ambassador to China Lev Karakhan visiting Zhongnanhai.

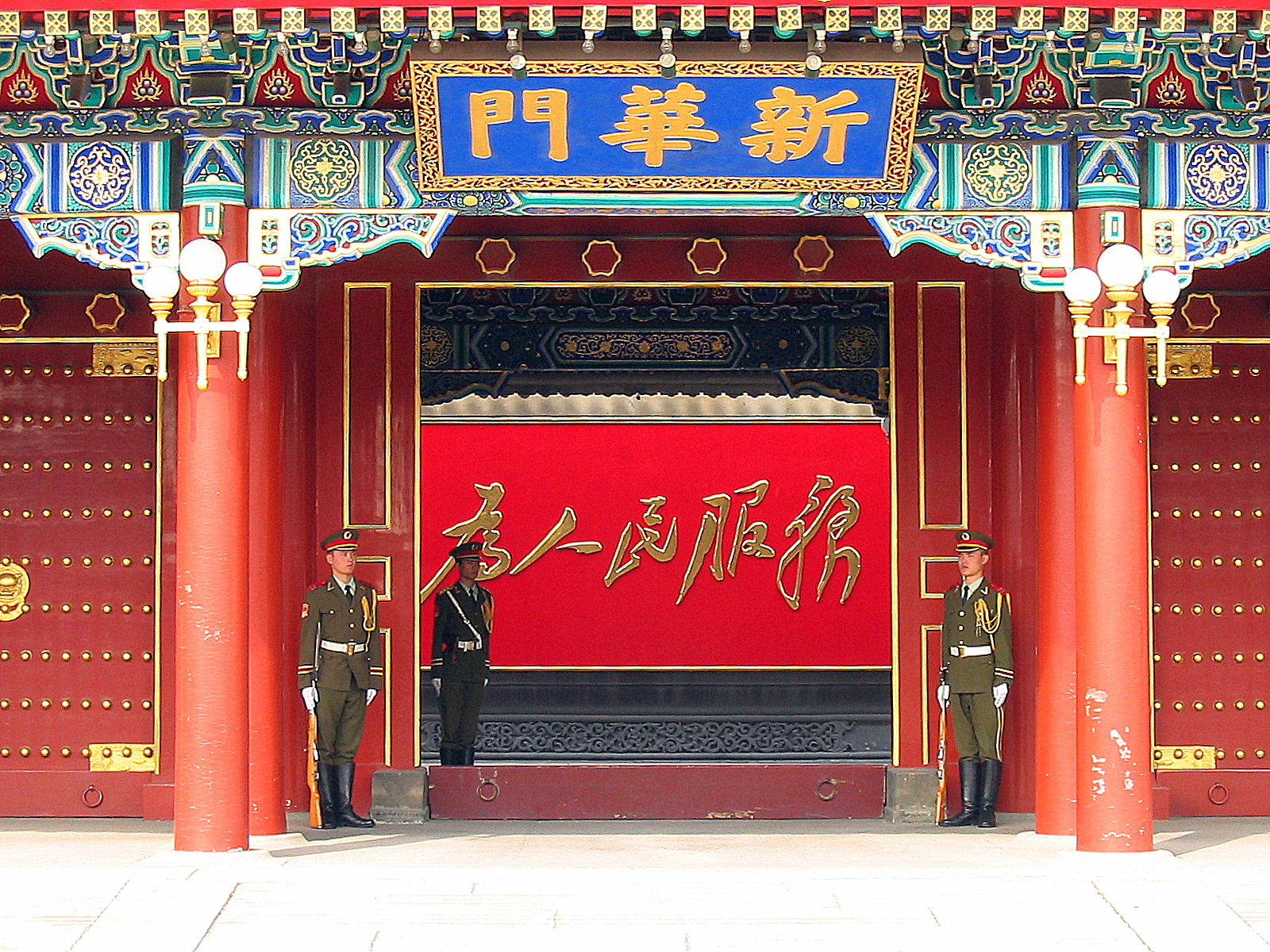
"Serve the People" written on the plaque of Xinhua Gate and the screen wall inside the gate

After the establishment of the Republic of China, Yuan Shikai served as the provisional president of the Republic of China (later changed to the president of the Republic of China). Yuan Shikai's government took over the three Western Gardens of the Qing Dynasty. In 1913, Zhonghai and Nanhai were turned into the Presidential Palace. Since then, Zhonghai and Nanhai were collectively called the Zhongnanhai. In 1913, under the supervision of Zhu Qiqin, the Minister of the Interior and the Director of the Kyoto Municipal Office, Baoyue Tower was rebuilt into the main gate of Zhongnanhai, called Xinhua Gate. The section of West Chang'an Street in front of Xinhua Gate was named "Fuqian Street", and the newly opened road on the west side of Zhongnanhai was named "Fuyou Street" ("Fu" refers to the Presidential Palace). Afterwards, the road rebuilt on the drainage ditch south of Liubukou was named "Xinhua Street" (now North Xinhua Street and South Xinhua Street). A Western-style flower wall was built on the south side of "Fuqian Street" opposite Xinhua Gate to cover the messy and dilapidated bungalows behind it and improve the appearance in front of the Presidential Palace. At the same time, the project also demolished the main gate of the Huiying Mosque on the north side.

During the reconstruction project, a section of the imperial city wall on the south side of Baoyue Tower was demolished, and two new eight-shaped walls were built on the east and west sides to connect the imperial city wall and Baoyue Tower. A large screen wall was also built on the north side of the building, near the Taiye Lake, to block the view of outsiders. The plaque "Xinhua Gate" was written by Yuan Lizhun. The plaque is 0.64 meters high and 1.6 meters wide, and the font is in the official script. This plaque is still hanging on the door today. A pair of stone lions are placed in front of the door, which are said to be relics of the original Prince Duan's Mansion. It is said that this was the largest pair of stone lions in the old city of Beijing.

After the founding of the People's Republic of China, Zhongnanhai became the seat of the CCP Central Committee and the Central People's Government (abolished in 1954 and replaced by the State Council). After the outbreak of the Cultural Revolution, the Red Guards "destroyed the Four Olds" in Beijing in August 1966. The stone lions in front of Xinhua Gate were also regarded as the target of the Red Guards. On August 26, 1966, Premier Zhou Enlai, based on the protection of cultural relics and historical sites, patiently persuaded the Red Guards and ordered the stone lions in front of Xinhua Gate to be moved away, thus protecting them. Later, the pair of stone lions returned to their original location.

Around May or June 1967, the five red characters "Serve the People" were carved out of wood and pasted on the screen wall inside the Xinhua Gate; two slogans were carved out of wood, "Long Live the Great Chinese Communist Party!" and "Long Live the Invincible Mao Zedong Thought!" and pasted on the eight-character walls on both sides of the gate. Around 1970, the Zhongnanhai Restoration Department processed the five characters "Serve the People" and the two slogans on the screen wall of the Xinhua Gate, pasting gold foil on the five characters "Serve the People" to make them gold characters on a red background, and making the two slogans into plexiglass light boxes. Later, the two slogans were changed to white characters with gold foil borders. Mao Zedong wrote the five characters "Serve the People" many times after the founding of the People's Republic of China. The five characters on the screen wall of the Xinhua Gate are the best ones selected from the many scrolls written by Mao Zedong after the founding of the People's Republic of China.

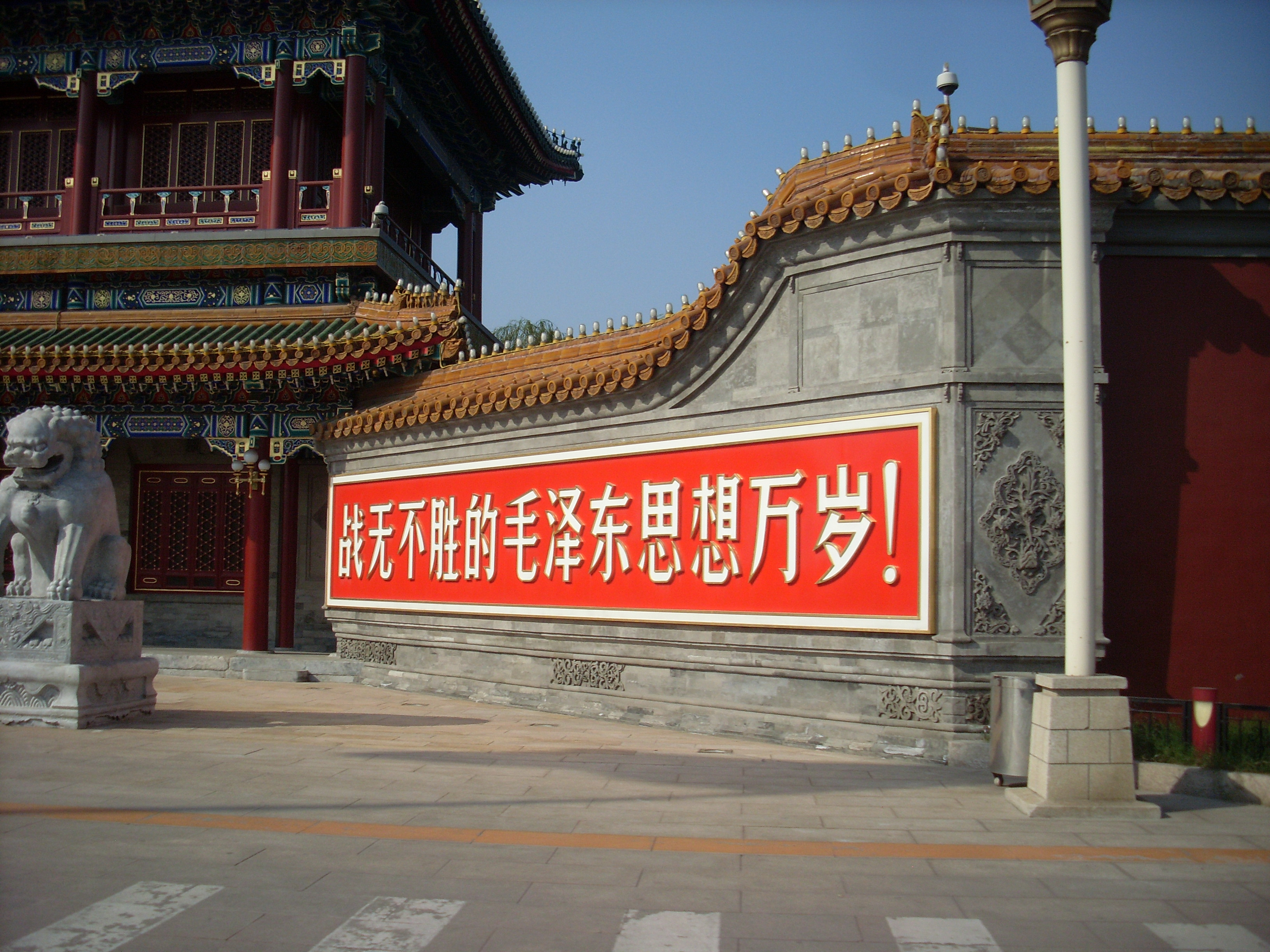
The slogan on the east wall reads "Long live the invincible Mao Zedong Thought!" and the stone lions

These two slogans and the "red revolutionization" of some key buildings in Beijing were formed at the same time. From 1966 to early 1969, in accordance with the instructions of Zhou Enlai and the leaders of the State Council General Office, Yang Yaren of the General Office was responsible for the "red revolutionization" of the Great Hall of the People, the Beijing Hotel, several gates of Zhongnanhai, Ziguang Pavilion, West Flower Hall and Song Qingling's residence. Among the gates of Zhongnanhai, only Xinhua Gate was not "redified" by Yang Yaren, but by Yao Fachang, the cultural officer of the Political Department of the Central Guard Corps. Yao Fachang once took two slogans in artistic fonts to seek Yang Yaren's opinion. One was "Long live the great Chinese Communist Party" and the other was "Long live the invincible Mao Zedong Thought". After Yang Yaren modified some of the lines of the artistic fonts, he introduced to Yao Fachang the production process and effect of the light slogans on the walls on both sides of the main entrance of the Great Hall of the People. Yao Fachang took notes and said that he would recommend the leaders to make them accordingly when he returned. Later, these two slogans were made into light-style slogans.

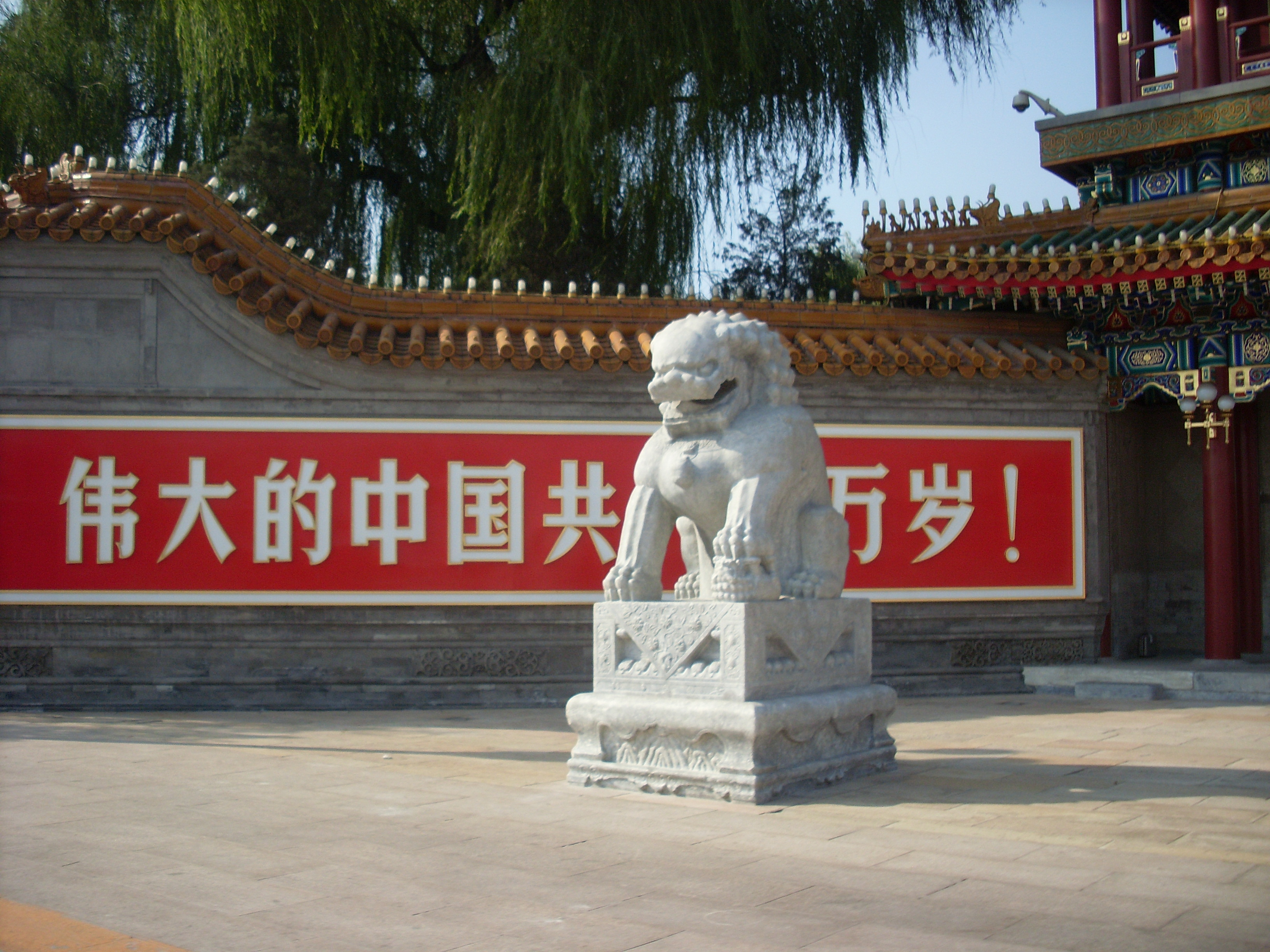
The slogan "Long live the great Chinese Communist Party!" and the stone lions on the west wall

According to the documentary "China" shot by Antonioni, at some time in 1972, the slogan on the eight-character wall on the east side of Xinhuamen was "Long live the great leader Chairman Mao!".

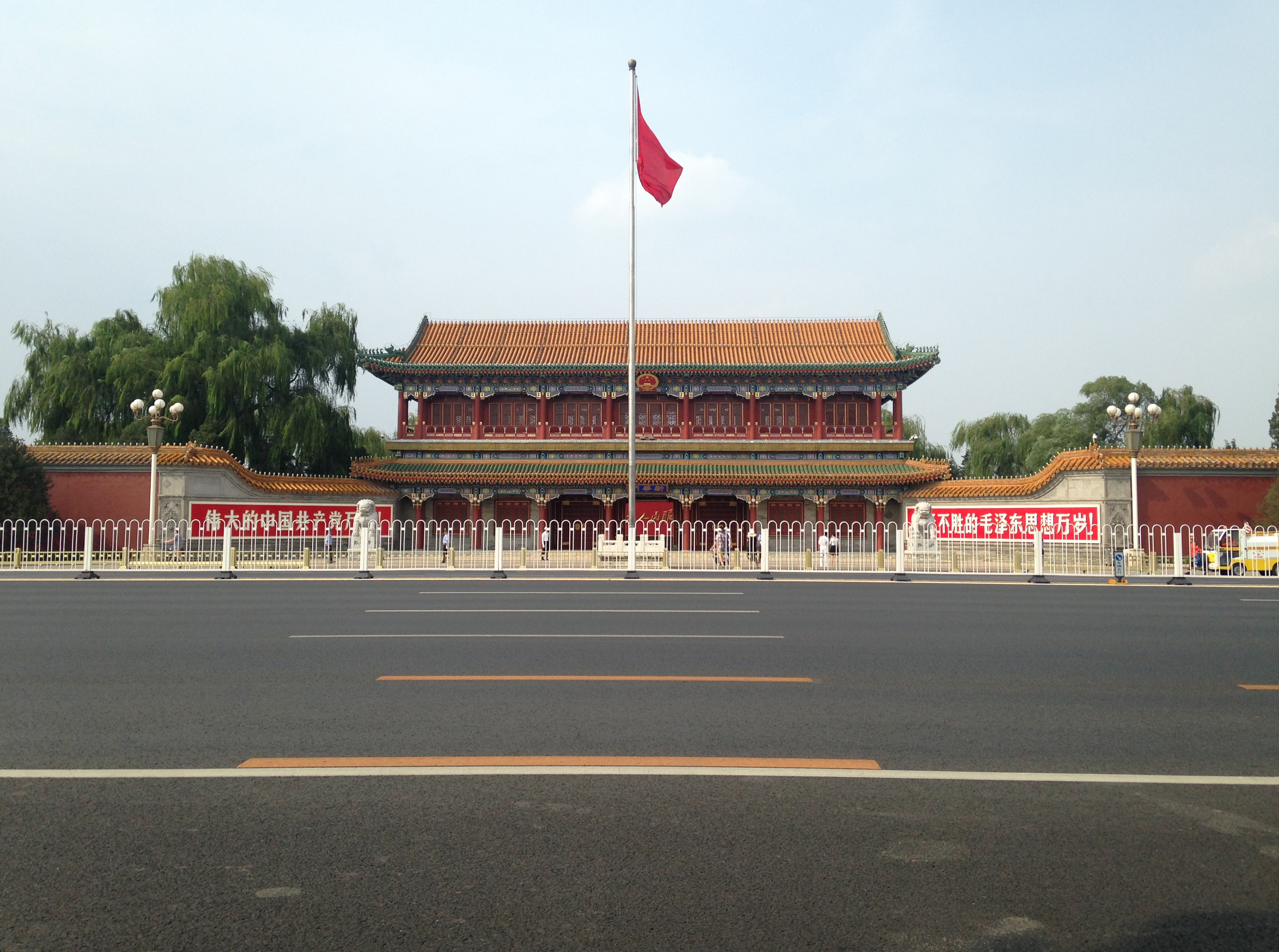
Xinhua Gate in 2015

In June 1981, the Sixth Plenary Session of the 11th Central Committee of the Chinese Communist Party reviewed and passed the "Resolution on Certain Questions in the History of Our Party since the Founding of the People's Republic of China", which completely negated the Cultural Revolution. All parts of China began to clean up the traces of the Cultural Revolution such as slogans, quotations, and slogans. At the same time, the slogans and quotation boards left in Zhongnanhai were also cleaned up. The Central Security Bureau once specifically studied which slogans and quotations in Zhongnanhai should be cancelled and which should be retained, including the two slogans in front of Xinhua Gate and the words on the screen wall, and then reported to the Central Committee of the Chinese Communist Party. In the end, the two slogans in front of Xinhua Gate and the words on the screen wall have been preserved to this day.

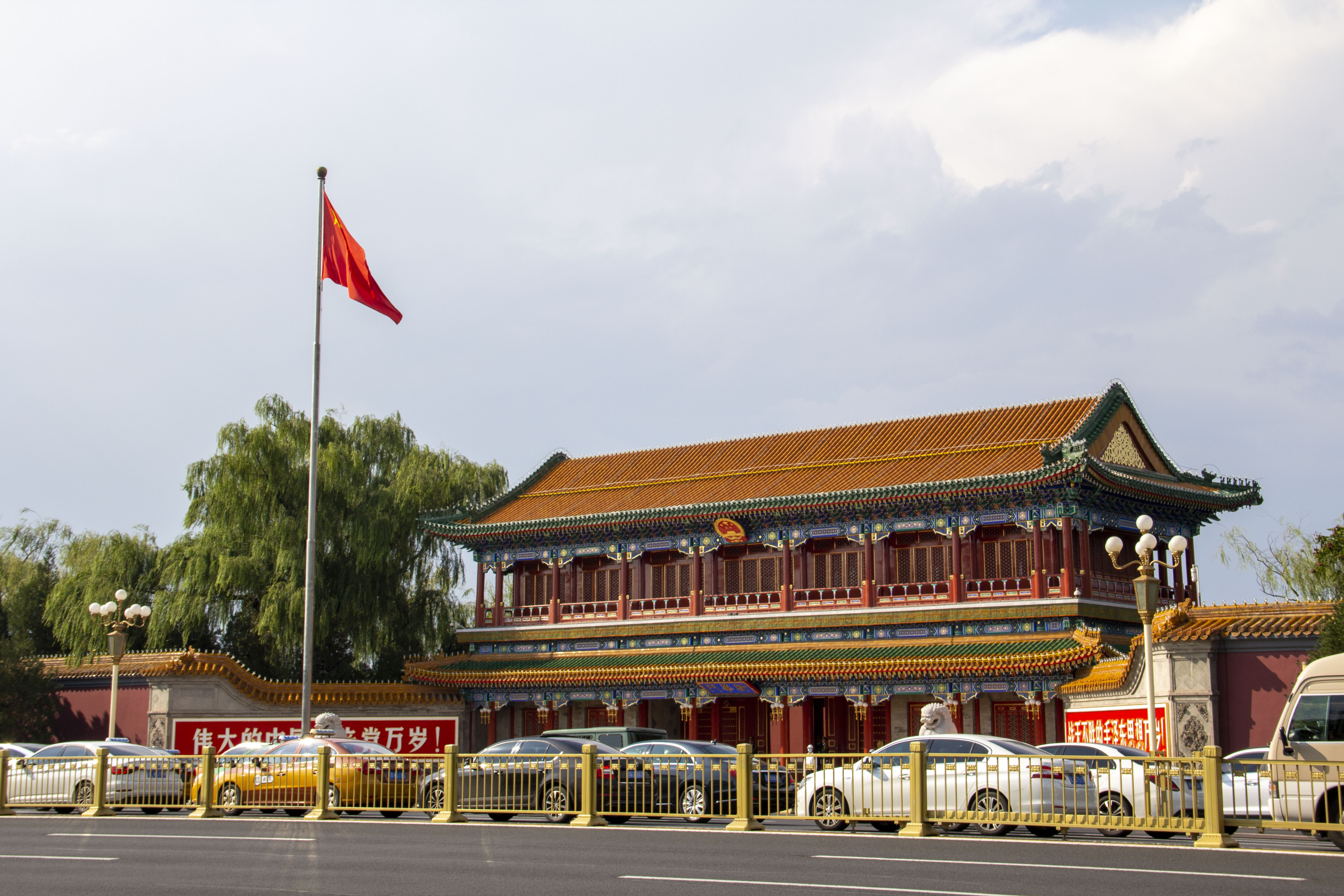
Xinhua Gate in 2020

Article 5 of the National Flag Law of the People's Republic of China, promulgated and implemented in 1990, stipulates that the Xinhua Gate "shall display the national flag every day". Article 4 of the National Emblem Law of the People's Republic of China, promulgated and implemented in 1991, stipulates that people's governments at or above the county level shall display the national emblem.

In 1999, in order to celebrate the 50th anniversary of the founding of the People's Republic of China, the Xinhuamen area was renovated with lighting as part of the overall renovation of Chang'an Avenue.

In August 2016, a colorful fence was erected in front of Xinhua Gate, and the renovation of Xinhua Gate was fully launched. The renovation was completed on August 14, and the gate was unveiled with a brand new look.

== Architecture ==
Xinhua Gate is a two-story brick and wood structure. It is seven rooms wide, with the three central rooms on the lower floor serving as doorways. It has a hip roof and yellow glazed tiles with green trimmings. The national emblem of China hangs above the second-story building. Under the eaves of the first floor in front of the building hangs a horizontal plaque with the three characters "Xinhua Gate" in gold regular script on a stone blue background. On the screen wall inside Xinhua Gate, Mao Zedong wrote "Serve the People" in gold characters on a red background. On the eight-character walls on both sides of Xinhua Gate, there are two slogans in white characters on a red background: "Long live the great Chinese Communist Party!" and "Long live the invincible Mao Zedong Thought!" There is a pair of stone lions on both sides of the gate, and a flagpole stands in front of the gate, hoisting the national flag of China.

== Commemoration ==
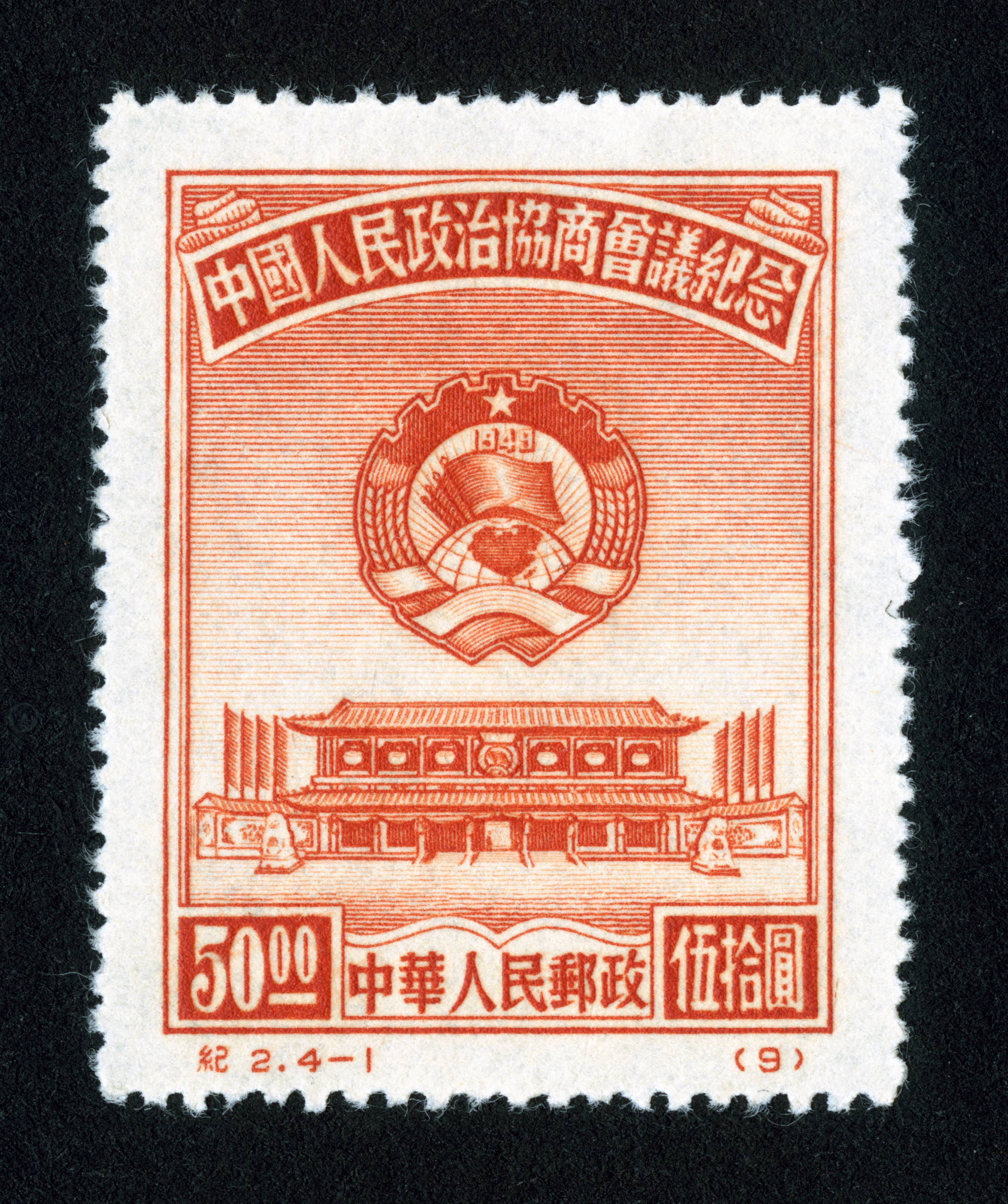
Xinhua Gate on stamps

- Commemorative 2 "Chinese People's Political Consultative Conference Commemorative": Issued by the North China Postal Administration on February 1, 1950, designed by Zhang Ding and Zhong Ling. The designs of 4-1 and 4-2 are Xinhua Gate.
- 1999-13 "Fiftieth Anniversary of the Founding of the Chinese People's Political Consultative Conference": Issued by China Post on September 21, 1999, designed by Ma Quan. The pattern on 2-1 is Xinhua Gate.
