= National emblem of China =

National Emblem of the People's Republic of China
- Armiger: China
- Adopted: 20 September 1950; 76 years ago

National Emblem of the People's Republic of China
- Simplified Chinese: 中华人民共和国国徽
- Traditional Chinese: 中華人民共和國國徽
Transcriptions
Standard Mandarin
- Hanyu Pinyin: Zhōnghuá Rénmín Gònghéguó guóhuī
- Wade–Giles: Chung-hua Jen-min Konghe-kuo Kuohui

The National Emblem of the People's Republic of China is a national symbol of the People's Republic of China and contains in a red circle a representation of Tiananmen Gate. Above Tiananmen Gate are the five stars found on the national flag, with four small five-pointed stars surrounding a large five-pointed star in a semi-circle. The outer border of the red circle shows sheaves of wheat and the inner sheaves of rice, which together represent agricultural workers. At the center of the bottom portion of the border is a cog-wheel that represents industrial workers.

The national emblem of the People's Republic of China was created by a design team composed of Liang Sicheng, Lin Huiyin, Li Zongjin, Mo Zongjiang, Zhu Changzhong and others from the Department of Architecture of Tsinghua University. The emblem was proposed at the second session of the 1st National Committee of the Chinese People's Political Consultative Conference on 23 June 1950, and adopted at the eighth session of the Central People's Government Council on June 28 of the same year. The legal status of this version of the national emblem was later written to the national constitution.

The emblem officially symbolizes the revolutionary struggles of the Chinese people since the May Fourth Movement and the coalition of the proletariat which succeeded in founding the People's Republic of China. The gear and ears of grain symbolize the workers and peasants of China, Tiananmen symbolizes the fighting spirit of the Chinese people, and the five stars symbolize the unity of the country's people led by the Chinese Communist Party.

== History ==
=== Republic of China ===
==== Beiyang period ====
National emblem of the Republic of China (1912–1927) and the Empire of China (1915–1916)

The Empire of China during the Manchu-led Qing dynasty did not have an official state emblem, but the flag featured the azure dragon on a plain yellow field with a red sun of the three-legged crow in the upper left corner. It became the first national flag of China and is usually referred to as the Yellow Dragon Flag.

Following the end of Manchu rule, new national symbols were deemed necessary by the leaders to represent the changed circumstances. The renowned writers Lu Xun, Qian Daosun, and Xu Shoushang from the Ministry of Education were tasked with designing a new national emblem. It was presented on August 28, 1912, and was adopted as national emblem in February 1913. President-Emperor Yuan Shikai continued its use during his short imperial reign from 1915 to 1916. The emblem is based on the ancient symbols of the Twelve Ornaments. These are first mentioned as already ancient in the Book of Documents by Emperor Shun, who was one of the legendary Three Sovereigns and Five Emperors. Oral tradition holds that he lived sometime between 2294 and 2184 BC. According to the book, the emperor wished for the symbols to be used on official robes of the state.

==== Nationalist period ====
Blue Sky with a White Sun emblem of the Republic of China (1928–present)

The Northern Expedition led by Generallissimo Chiang Kai-shek and the Kuomintang party led to the overthrow of the fractious yet internationally recognized Beiyang government in 1928. This ushered in a one-party state under the Kuomintang known as the Nanjing decade. The state emblem was therefore replaced with the Kuomintang Blue Sky with a White Sun party symbol. The "Blue Sky, White Sun, and a Wholly Red Earth" flag has remained the flag of the Republic of China to this day. During this period, under the KMT's political tutelage, the Blue Sky with a White Sun Flag shared the same prominence as the ROC flag. A common wall display consisted of the KMT flag perched on the left and the ROC flag perched on the right, each tilted at an angle with a portrait of National Father Sun Yat-sen displayed in the center. After the promulgation of the Constitution of the Republic of China, the party flag was removed from such a display and the national flag was moved to the center.

Since the ROC government moved to Taiwan and especially in the years since the end of martial law the Kuomintang flag has lost some of its prominence. However, it is still frequently seen on KMT party buildings in political rallies and other meetings of KMT and the pan-blue coalition.

=== People's Republic of China ===
Emblem of the Chinese Soviet Republic (1934–1937)

Emblem of the Chinese People's Political Consultative Conference, designed by China Central Academy of Fine Arts, which their first round proposal was based on.

The first communist government in China known as the Chinese Soviet Republic had the emblem adopted in 1934. It consisted of a hammer and sickle on a globe, and the grain ears are placed under and on both sides of the earth. Above the earth and the five-pointed star is written the "Chinese Soviet Republic" on the top, and the "Workers of the world, unite!" written on the bottom.

On July 10, 1949, the government held a public competition for the design of the national emblem, however no satisfactory designs were selected. Therefore, on September 27, 1949, the First Plenary Session of Chinese People's Political Consultative Conference decided to invite designers for the proposals of the national emblem and two groups from two universities were selected in September 1949. Three proposals were selected for the first round discussion:

- The designers from China Central Academy of Fine Arts, Zhang Ding, Zhang Guangyu, Zhou Lingzhao and Zhong Ling, handed out their proposals with 5 variations on September 25, 1949. The symbolism of their first design was: The red star symbolizes Communism and the CCP. The cog and wheat/rice symbolizes unification of industrial workers and peasants. The rising earth with China in red symbolizes the socialist revolution in China and the world revolution ideal on Asian countries. 31 rays behind the earth symbolizes the 31 provincial administrative divisions at that time. The name of the People's Republic of China is written on the red ribbon below. The design was based on their design of the emblem of Charter of the Chinese People's Political Consultative Conference, and was influenced by Socialist heraldry of the Eastern Bloc.
- The designers from the Department of Architecture at Tsinghua University, Liang Sicheng, Lin Huiyin, Mo Zongjiang, Zhu Changzhong, Li Zongjin and Gao Zhuang, handed their proposal on October 30, 1949. According to their proposal, the design was a mixture of traditional Chinese culture and Maoist New Democratic Revolution ideals. The design imitated the style of mirrors in Han dynasty, symbolizing brightness. The disc was made of jade, a symbol of peace and unity. Decorative carvings on the disc was in Tang dynasty style. The stars from national flag and a cog were placed in the center of the disc, surrounded by wheats, symbolizing unity of working class and socialism. The red ribbon tied a smaller jade ring, symbolising the unification of Chinese people.
- The other proposal by Zhang Ding, Zhang Guangyu, Zhou Lingzhao, was a perspective depiction of Tian'anmen gate.
First round proposals of the national emblem

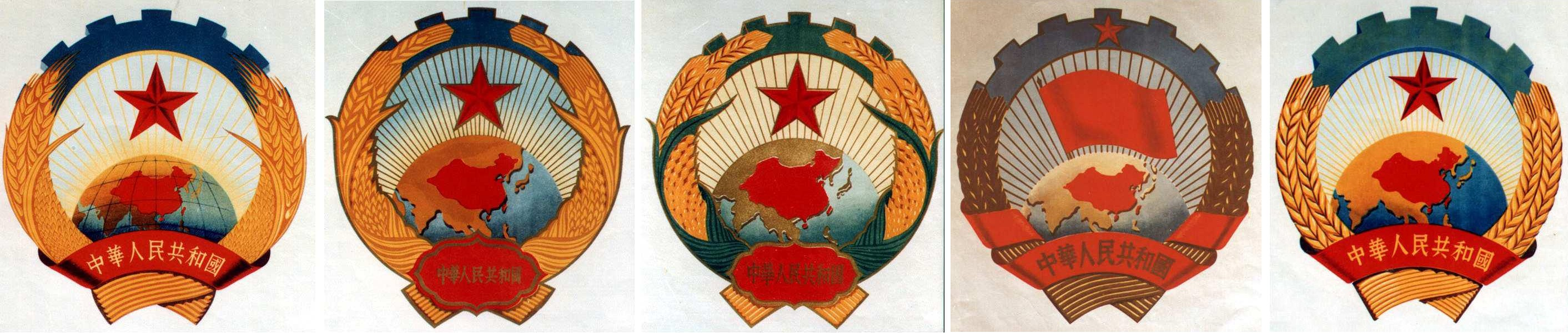
Proposals of China Central Academy of Fine Arts, September 25, 1949

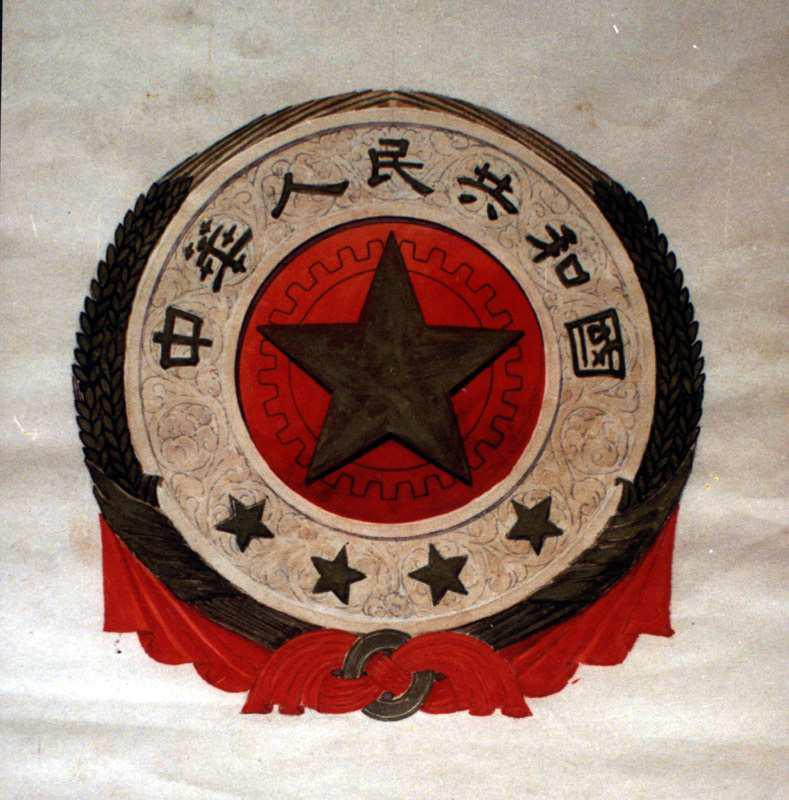
Proposal of Tsinghua University, October 30, 1949

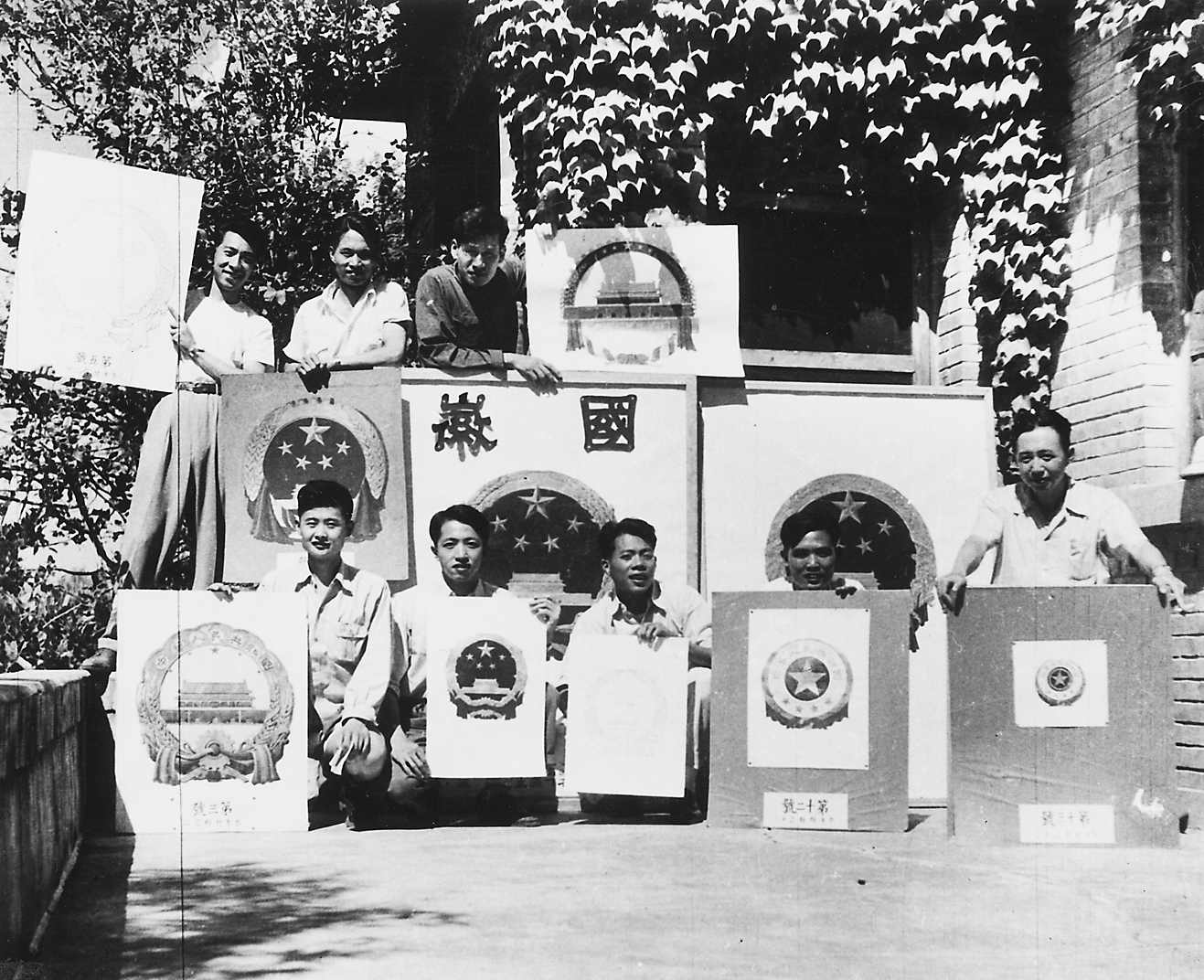
Second round proposals by Tsinghua University

Members of the first Charter of the Chinese People's Political Consultative Conference committee discussed these three proposals on June 10, 1950. The result of the discussion was, the China Central Academy of Fine Arts proposal was too colourful to be regarded as trademarks, and proposal from Tsinghua University was regarded as bourgeois due to its use of traditional symbols. The committee suggested the groups include the Tian'anmen Gate, a symbol of Chinese revolution that served as the location of the May Fourth Movement and foundation ceremony of the People's Republic of China on October 1, 1949.

The two groups then worked on a second round of proposals. The second round proposals from Tsinghua University were based on standardized design of the Tian'anmen Gate on the emblem and red and yellow were chosen as the main colours.

Second round proposals of the national emblem

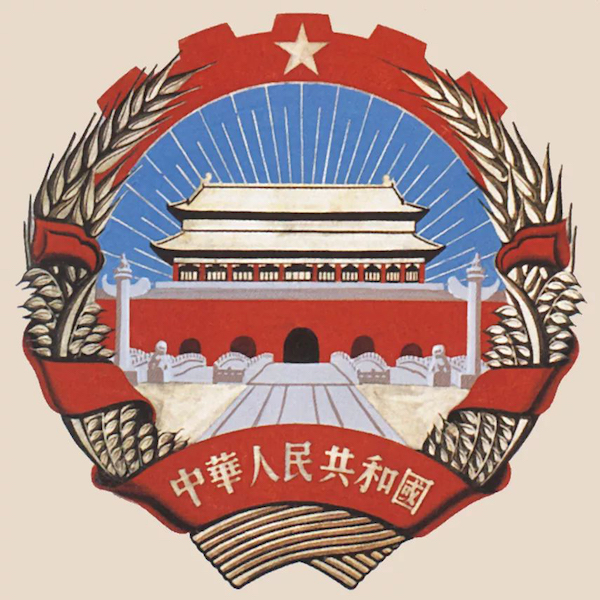
Proposal of China Central Academy of Fine Arts
No.1 - June 15, 1950

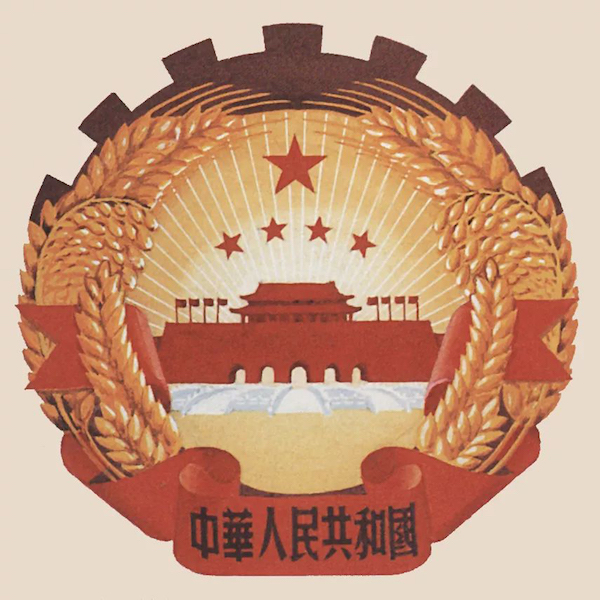
Proposal of China Central Academy of Fine Arts
No.2

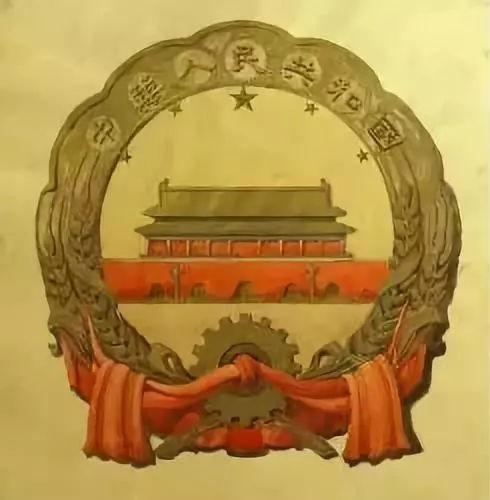
Proposal of Tsinghua University
No.1

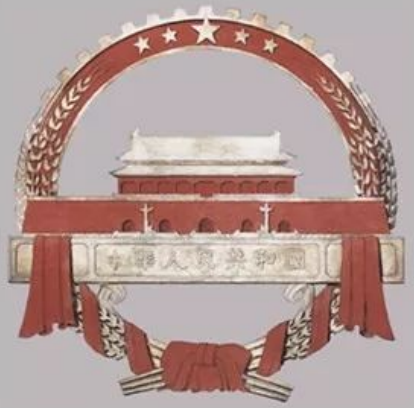
Proposal of Tsinghua University
No.2

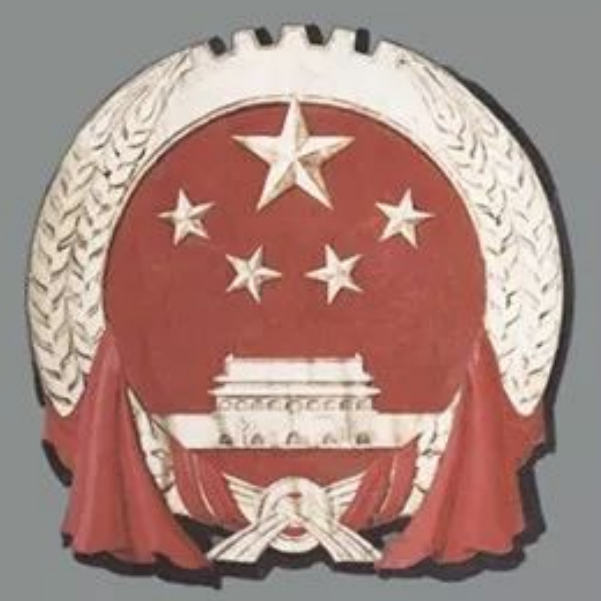
Proposal of Tsinghua University
No.3

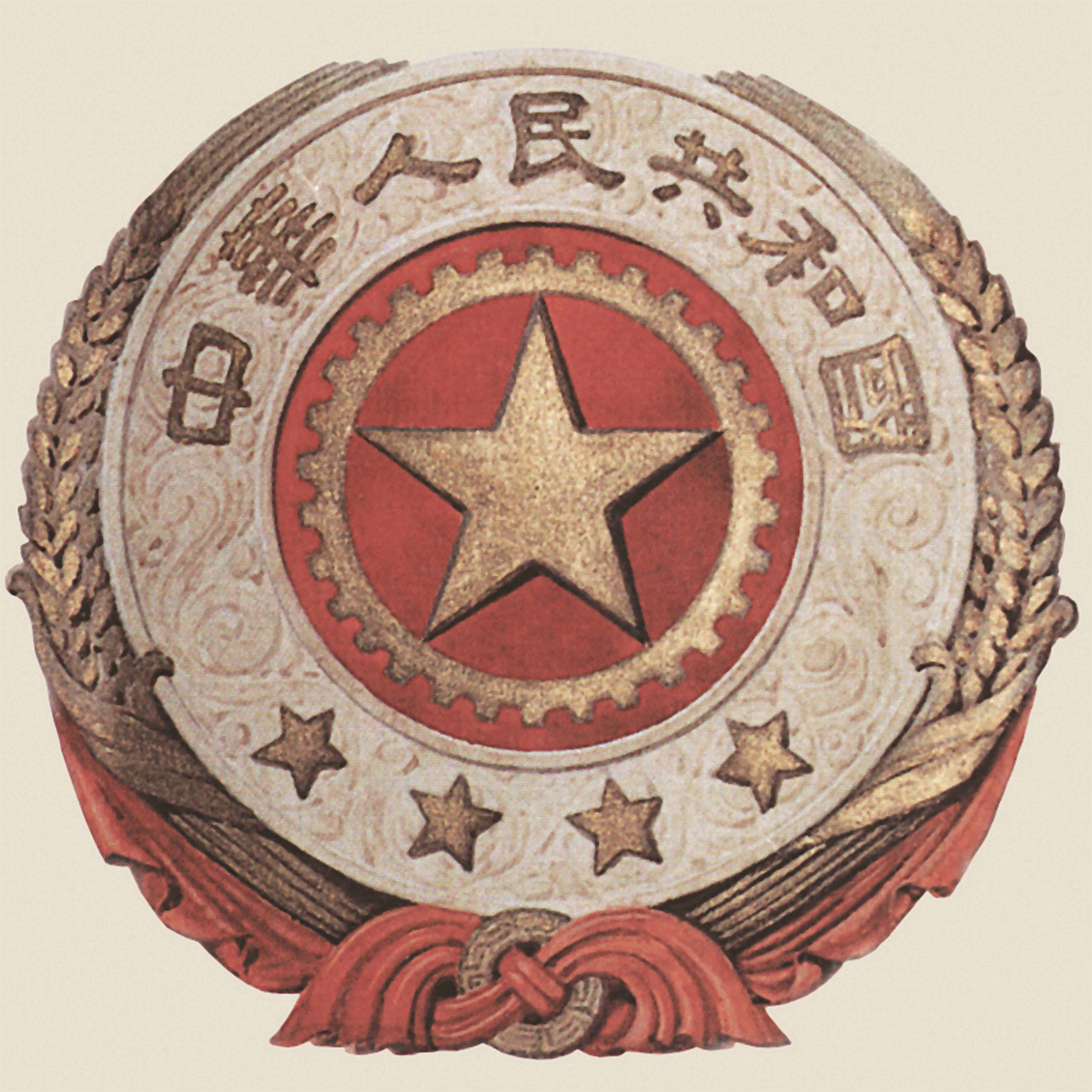
Proposal of Tsinghua University

At the Chinese People's Political Consultative Conference committee meeting on June 15, proposals from Tsinghua University were chosen and the committee suggested "Combine the design of No.1 and No.3. with outer ring of No.1 and content of No.3".

Tsinghua University presented their new design and their proposal was selected and officially made the national emblem on 20 September 1950 by the Central People's Government. The selected design was further standardized and simplified by Gao Zhuang and was confirmed on August 18, 1950.

Selected proposal of the national emblem

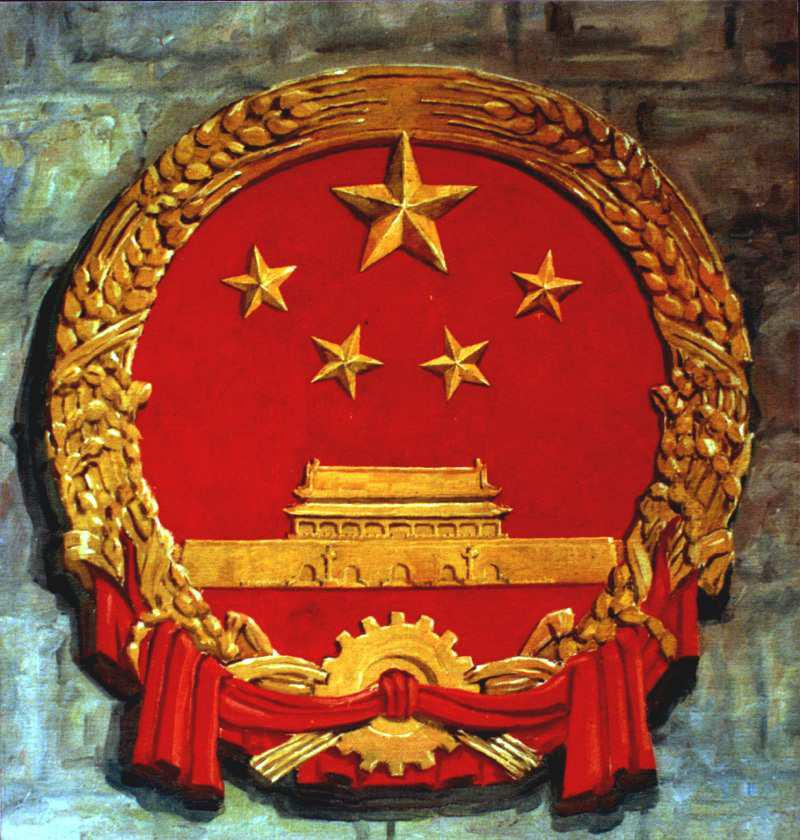
Initial design. June 17, 1950

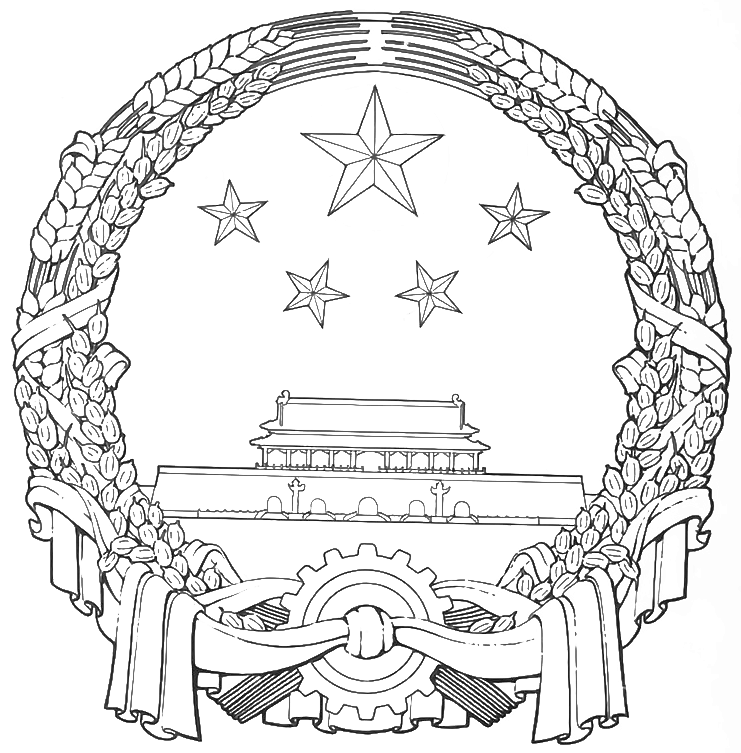
Sketch of the initial design. June 20, 1950

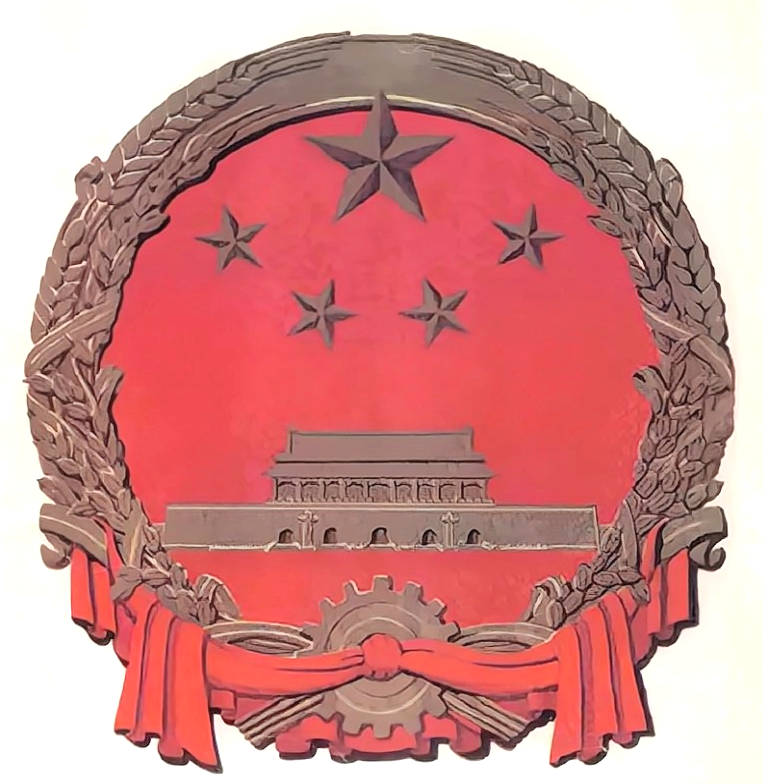
Initial design. June 20, 1950

== Symbolism ==
The emblem is described as being "composed of patterns of the national flag":

...The red color of the flag symbolizes revolution and the yellow color of the stars the golden brilliant rays radiating from the vast red land. The design of four smaller stars surrounding a bigger one signifies the unity of the Chinese people under the leadership of the Communist Party of China (CPC).

—China Yearbook 2004

According to The Description of the National Emblem of the People's Republic of China (中华人民共和国国徽图案说明), these elements taken together symbolize the revolutionary struggles of the Chinese people since the May Fourth Movement and the coalition of the proletariat which succeeded in founding the People's Republic of China.

== Construction ==
The Law of the People's Republic of China on the National Emblem sets the standards of the national emblem. National standard of China: GB 15093-2008 specifies the construction, material and color of the national emblem.

Proportion	Construction

== Emblems of subdivisions ==
Before the Communist takeover of mainland China, the ROC had provinces design their own emblems. Only two emblems were used so far. On April 15, 1985, Taiyuan City officially announced its emblem, becoming the first city in the People's Republic of China to have a city emblem. Hong Kong and Macao each have their own emblem. The National People's Congress have passed the standardized use of the two special administrative regions' emblems. Under Chinese law since November 1997, only Hong Kong and Macau are allowed to have their own emblems and other localities that had them had to stop using theirs. This rule was ignored in 2011 when the city of Chengdu chose the Golden Sun Bird found under the city's Jinsha site as its emblem.

=== Cities ===
Chengdu

Guangzhou (1926–1949)

Kunming (1922–1949)

=== Special administrative regions ===
Hong Kong

Macau

== Historical emblems ==
Imperial Seal of the Ming dynasty.

Imperial Seal of the Qing dynasty.

Taiping Heavenly Kingdom (1851–1864)

National emblem of the Republic of China (1912–1927) and the Empire of China (1915–1916)

Blue Sky with a White Sun emblem of the Republic of China (1928–present) and the Roundel of the Republic of China Air Force (1991–present)

Roundel of the Republic of China Air Force (1928–1991)

Roundel of the Republic of China Air Force (1928–1991), light version

Emblem of Chinese Taipei used during the Olympic Games (1981–present)

Emblem of the Republic of China with encircling text as depicted on ROC passports (2021–present)

Emblem of the Chinese Soviet Republic (1934–1937)

North Shanxi Autonomous Government (1937–1939)

Mengjiang (1939–1945)

Imperial Seal of Manchukuo (1932–1945)

Shanghai International Settlement (pre WWI)

Shanghai International Settlement

Emblem of the National Reorganized Government of the Republic of China (1940–1945)

Seal of the People's Government of the People's Republic of China (1949–1959)

Emblem of the People's Republic of China (1950–present)

== See also ==
- Flag of China
- March of the Volunteers
