= Blue Sky with a White Sun =

National emblem of the Republic of China

Emblem of the Republic of China
- Armiger: Republic of China
- Adopted: December 17, 1928; 97 years ago (Nationalist government); October 25, 1945; 81 years ago (Taiwan)
- Relinquished: October 1, 1949; 77 years ago (Mainland China)
- Shield: Upon a circular escutcheon azure, a sun in splendor argent, its disk of diameter one-third the breadth of the escutcheon, encompassed by an annulet of the field one-fifteenth the sun's diameter, from which issue twelve rays in acute angles of thirty degrees, four rays in cross pointing to the cardinal quarters with eight intermediate rays equally spaced, all rays reaching to a distance from the escutcheon's edge equal to the sun's radius.
- Use: 1928–1949 (Mainland China); 1945–present (Taiwan)

Party Emblem of the Kuomintang
- Armiger: Kuomintang

Kuomintang
- Naval Jack, Party Flag
- "Blue Sky with a White Sun" flag (青天白日旗)
- Use: Kuomintang party flag and the ROC naval jack
- Proportion: 2∶3
- Adopted: 1895; 131 years ago
- Design: A white sun with twelve rays on blue background.
- Designed by: Lu Haodong
- Alternate dark blue version for the "Blue Sky with a White Sun" flag

The Blue Sky with a White Sun (Chinese: 青天白日; pinyin: Qīngtiān Báirì) is the national emblem of the Republic of China, both during its history in mainland China and on Taiwan.

In the "Blue Sky with a White Sun" symbol, the twelve rays of the white Sun representing the twelve months and the twelve traditional Chinese hours (時辰; shíchen), each of which corresponds to two modern hours and symbolizes the spirit of progress.

== Official description ==
The national emblem of the Republic of China is officially described in the National Emblem and National Flag of the Republic of China Act:

The national emblem of the Republic of China is a blue sky with a white sun in the following form:

1. A blue circle.
2. A white sun in the middle, with 12 white rays with pointed angles.
3. There is a blue ring between the white sun and the white rays with pointed angles.

The position, angle and ratio of each subparagraph of the previous article are as follows:

1. The center of the blue background circle is the center of the white sun.
2. The ratio of the radius of the white sun to the radius of the surrounding blue circle is 1:3.
3. The length from the center of the white sun to the top of a white ray with a pointed angle is twice the length of the radius of the white sun.
4. The width of the blue ring between the white sun and the 12 white rays with pointed angles is equivalent to 1/15 of the diameter of the white sun.
5. The top angle of each white ray with a pointed angle is 30 degrees, with the 12 rays totaling 360 degrees.
6. The upper, lower, left and right sides of the white rays with pointed angles shall be facing north, south, east and west. The rest shall be evenly spread out.

== History of the Blue Sky White Sun design ==
National Emblem of the Republic of China
- Traditional Chinese: 中華民國國徽
- Simplified Chinese: 中华民国国徽
Transcriptions
Standard Mandarin
- Hanyu Pinyin: Zhōnghuá Mínguó guóhuī
- Wade–Giles: Chung-hua Min-kuo Kuohui

The "Blue Sky with a White Sun" flag was originally designed by Lu Hao-tung, a martyr of the Republican revolution. He presented his design to represent the revolutionary army at the inauguration of the Society for Regenerating China, an anti-Qing society in Hong Kong, on February 21, 1895.

During the Wuchang Uprising in 1911 that heralded the Republic of China, the various revolutionary armies had different flags. Lu Hao-tung's "Blue Sky with a White Sun" flag was used in the southern provinces of Guangdong, Guangxi, Yunnan, and Guizhou, while the "18-Star Flag", "Five-Colored Flag", and other designs were used elsewhere.

When the government of the Republic of China was established on January 1, 1912, the "Five-Colored" flag was adopted as the national flag, but Sun Yat-sen did not consider its design appropriate, reasoning that horizontal order implied a hierarchy or class like that which existed during dynastic times. Thus, when he established a rival government in Guangzhou in 1917, he brought over the "Blue Sky with a White Sun" flag for the party and the "Blue Sky, White Sun, and a Wholly Red Earth" (青天白日滿地紅) flag, which was then the naval ensign, for the nation. This officially became the national flag in 1928 while the "Blue Sky with a White Sun" flag was adopted as the naval jack.

The "Blue Sky, White Sun, and a Wholly Red Earth" flag has remained the flag of the Republic of China to this day.

== National emblem and history ==
=== Beiyang period ===
Twelve Symbols national emblem, national emblem of the Republic of China (1913–1928) and the Empire of China (1915–1916).

The national emblem of the Republic of China was derived from the Blue Sky with a White Sun flag. The emblem was designed by He Yingqin at Whampoa Military Academy in 1924 and was set as the national emblem by the Law of national flag and national emblem of the Republic of China in 1928.

On the national emblem rays of sun have some distance to the edge, symbolizing the broadness of the sky, while on Kuomintang emblem the rays reach the edge, symbolizing the spirit of revolution is as powerful as the sun.

The national emblem of the Republic of China from 1913 to 1928 is called Twelve Symbols national emblem, based on the traditional symbols on clothes of ancient Chinese emperors. It was designed by Lu Xun, Qian Daosun and Xu Shoushang on August 28, 1912, and was set as national emblem in February 1913. It remained as the national emblem during the Empire of China from 1915 to 1916. After the Northern Expedition it was replaced by the Blue Sky with a White Sun national emblem in 1928.

=== Nationalist period ===
Since 1928, under the KMT's political tutelage, the Blue Sky with a White Sun Flag shared the same prominence as the ROC flag. A common wall display consisted of the KMT flag perched on the left and the ROC flag perched on the right, each tilted at an angle with a portrait of Founding Father Sun Yat-sen displayed in the center. After the promulgation of the Constitution of the Republic of China, the party flag was removed from such a display and the national flag was moved to the center. To promote a sense of national identity, the design of the national emblem was freely available to use and was featured prominently in corporate logos, art during the era.

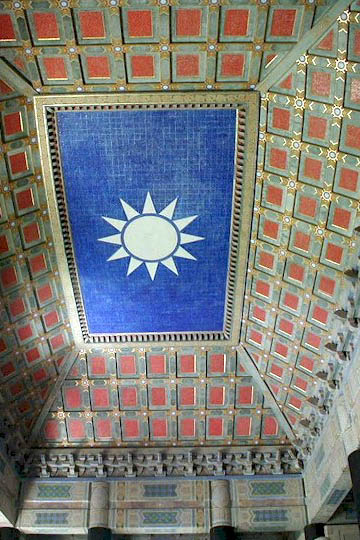
Ceiling of the sacrificial hall, Sun Yat-sen Mausoleum

Emblem of the City of Canton (1926–1949)

Coat of arms of Cardinal Paul Yü Pin, Archbishop of Nanking

Roundel of Eurasia Aviation Corporation, a defunct Chinese airline headquartered in Shanghai.

=== Taiwanese period ===
Since the ROC government moved to Taiwan and especially in the years since the end of martial law the KMT flag has lost some of its prominence. However, it is still frequently seen on KMT party buildings, in political rallies and other meetings of KMT and the pan-blue coalition.

The flag and the symbol made news during the ROC legislative elections of 2004, when President Chen Shui-bian suggested that the Kuomintang's flag and party emblem violated the ROC's National Emblem Law for being too similar to the national emblem of the Republic of China. Chen stated that the law forbids the ROC's emblem and flag from being used by non-governmental organizations and warned that the KMT would have three months to change its flag and emblem if his Democratic Progressive Party won a majority of seats in the legislature. The KMT responded by asking the government to change the national emblem, saying the KMT emblem existed first. However, the pan-green coalition failed to win a majority, and Chen took no action for the remainder of his presidency.

On 29 January 2021, the Legislative Yuan passed a resolution proposed by the New Power Party on 29 January instructing the Ministry of the Interior (MOI) to look into ways of addressing the issue of the similarity between the national emblem, in use since 1928 for all of China, and the KMT party flag. The MOI responded that through their analysis of the current situation, the change "should not be taken lightly," though suggesting that symbols of political parties could be changed.

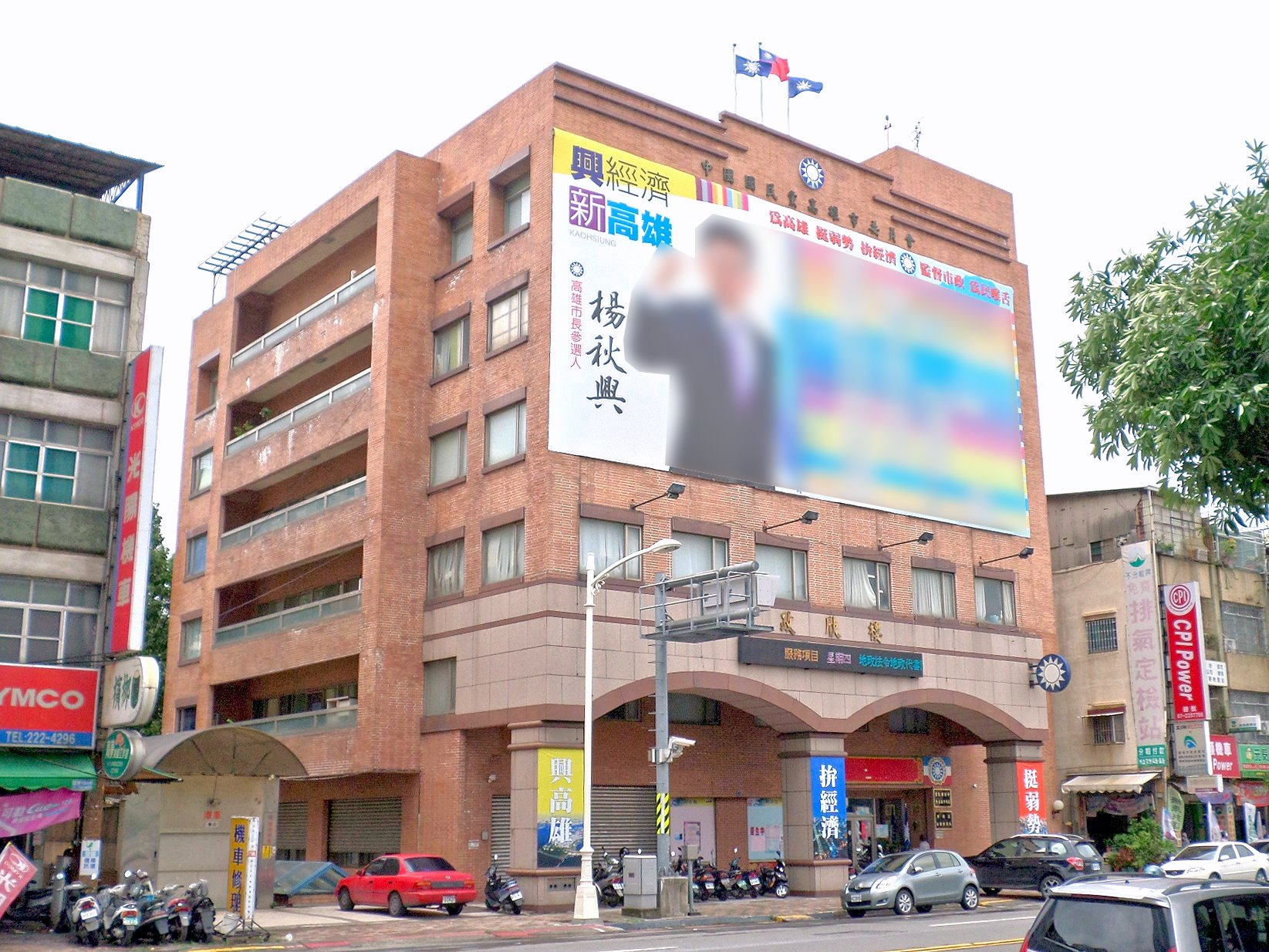
The KMT (sides) and ROC (center) flags displayed at a party building in Kaohsiung.

The Taiwan Railways Administration also used KMT emblem as its logo from 1945 to 1950.

== Use in other countries ==
The design of "Blue Sky with a White Sun" was used in the unit insignia or coats of arms of some units of the United States Army that fought in World War II. The most famous unit was Merrill's Marauders (officially named the "5307th Composite Unit (Provisional)"), which has the "Blue Sky with a White Sun" as part of its badge. The usage by US troops was a result of cooperation between US and Chinese Expeditionary Force in the China Burma India Theater. Postwar US military units stationed in Taiwan, including the United States Taiwan Defense Command (USTDC) and the Military Assistance Advisory Group (MAAG), also used the design in their badges.

The "Blue Sky with a White Sun" can still be seen in the emblem of the US Army 75th Ranger Regiment.

China Burma India Theater

Merrill's Marauders

75th Ranger Regiment

Military Assistance Advisory Group in Taiwan

United States Taiwan Defense Command

Flag of the People's action Party of Vietnam

== Other emblems ==
=== Historical Taiwanese emblems ===
Taiwan's earliest emblems were used by European colonialists.

In 1895, Taiwan was annexed by Japan. The emblem was worn as an official clothing of the Governor's Office in Taiwan which featured a Daijishō with a Sycamore leaf and chrysanthemum branch in a brown circle.

After the end of Japanese period, Taiwan was transferred to the Republic of China which adopted the Blue Sky with a White Sun emblem. This symbol remains in use to this day in Taiwan and by the Kuomintang.

=== Chinese Taipei ===
After the People's Republic of China became an IOC member, the ROC was forced to use the name Chinese Taipei for its competitions. The crest of the Chinese Taipei Olympic Committee includes symbols of the Olympic Committee and the Chinese Taipei team. At the periphery is a stylized plum blossom that symbolizes the National Flower of the Republic of China. The center of the emblem contains the Olympic rings and the Blue Sky with a White Sun (the proportion of the blue field is between that of the National Emblem of the Republic of China and the Party Emblem of the Kuomintang). The Olympic flag of Chinese Taipei depicts the emblem on a white field.

=== Subdivisions ===
==== Provinces (streamlined) ====
Fujian (1945–2019)

Taiwan (1945–2018)

==== Counties ====
Changhua County

Chiayi County

Hsinchu County

Hualien County

Kinmen County

Lienchiang County

Miaoli County

Nantou County

Penghu County

Pingtung County

Taitung County

Yilan County

Yunlin County

==== Historical ====
Hsinchu County (2016–2019)

Taitung County (pre-2014)

Hualien County (pre-2010)

== Gallery ==
Spanish Formosa (1624–1642)

Dutch Formosa (1624–1668)

Emblem on the flag of Kingdom of Tungning (1661–1683)

Seal of Taiwan under Qing rule (1683–1895)

Republic of Formosa (1895)

Emblem used during Japanese rule (1895–1945)

Standard of the President of the Republic of China (1928–present, revised in 1988)

Emblem of the Republic of China (1928–present) and Roundel of the Republic of China Air Force (1991–present)

Roundel of the Republic of China Air Force (1928–1991)

Roundel of the Republic of China Air Force (1928–1991), light version

Roundel of the Republic of China Air Force (1991–present), light version

Emblem of the National Reorganized Government of the Republic of China (1940–1945)

Olympic emblem of Chinese Taipei (1981–present)

Emblem of the Republic of China with encircling text as depicted on Taiwan passports (2021–present)

== See also ==
- History of the Republic of China
- Politics of the Republic of China
- Chinese Taipei
- Flag of the Republic of China
- Proposed flags of Taiwan
