= West Chang'an Avenue =

Road in Beijing, China

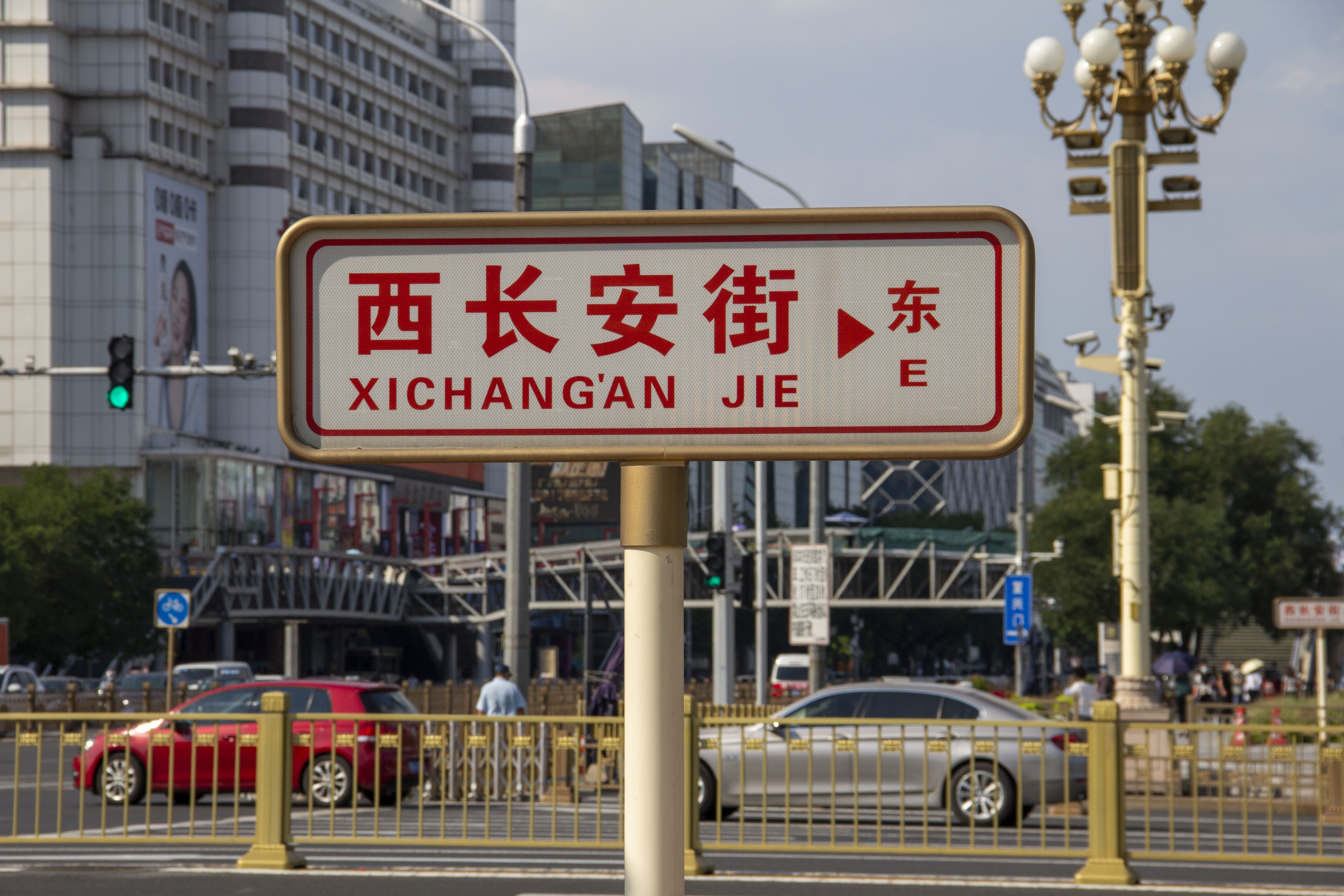
Sign on West Chang'an Avenue

West Chang'an Avenue (simplified Chinese: 西长安街; traditional Chinese: 西長安街; pinyin: Xī Cháng'ān Jiē) is a major avenue in urban Beijing. It forms part of the extended Chang'an Avenue.

== Location ==
It stretches from the intersection with Xidan in the west until Tian'anmen Square in the east.

The Beijing Books Building and CAAC building all sit along the avenue.

Some of the narrowest parts of Chang'an Avenue are immediately before and after Zhongnanhai. The southernmost entrance, Xinhuamen, is right on the avenue.

The avenue finishes off close to the Great Hall of the People.

Line 1 of the Beijing subway runs along the route.
