= 30th anniversary of the People's Republic of China =

The 30th anniversary of the founding of the People's Republic of China 庆祝中华人民共和国成立30周年大会
- Date: 29 September 1979
- Frequency: Select years
- Locations: Great Hall of the People, Beijing, China
- Years active: 77
- Inaugurated: 1 October 1949
- Previous event: 21st anniversary of the People's Republic of China
- Next event: 35th anniversary of the People's Republic of China
- Leader: Hua Guofeng (chairman)

The 30th anniversary of the founding of the People's Republic of China took place on 29 September 1979. Event was held at the Great Hall of the People in Beijing, the capital of China. Party and state leaders and people from all profession in the capital attended the event. There was no National Day military parade or mass pageant parade in this year.

On the same day, Hua Guofeng and other party and state leaders came to the Great Hall of the People. Hua Guofeng Chairman of the CPC Central Committee, Premier of the State Council, and Chairman of the Central Military Commission presided over the conference.

Subsequently, Ye Jianying, vice chairman of the Central Committee of the CPC and vice chairman of the CMC, delivered a speech on behalf of the Central Committee of the CCP, the State Council, and the Standing Committee of the National People's Congress. He reviewed the 30 years since the founding of the People's Republic of China, profoundly criticized Lin Biao and the "Gang of Four" for "deliberately creating and promoting the ultra-left line", initially summed up the basic experience of socialist revolution and construction, and clearly pointed out that it is necessary to further Carry out the direction of the spirit of the Third Plenary Session of the Eleventh Central Committee of the Party and the Second Session of the Fifth National People's Congress, emphasizing that while carrying out the four modernizations, we must also build a high degree of socialist spiritual civilization and a high degree of socialist democracy.
