= Socialist spiritual civilization =

Chinese Communist Party concept

- Simplified Chinese: 社会主义精神文明
Transcriptions
Standard Mandarin
- Hanyu Pinyin: Shèhuì zhǔyì jīngshén wénmíng

Socialist spiritual civilization is a concept in Chinese Communist Party (CCP) political discourse which stresses the need to uphold socialist ethics, patriotism, collectivism, and the "four haves" - ideals, morality, culture, and discipline.

== Overview ==
The concept of socialist spiritual civilization stresses the need to uphold socialist ethics, patriotism, collectivism, and the "four haves:" ideals, morality, culture, and discipline.

== History ==
During his speech for the 30th anniversary of the PRC, Ye Jianying emphasized that while carrying out the Four Modernizations, China must also build a high degree of socialist spiritual civilization and a high degree of socialist democracy.

Through the political discourse of socialist spiritual civilization, the CCP signaled to artists that cultural work can help restrain the negative social influences of markets.

The Central Guidance Commission on Building Spiritual Civilization (CGCBSC), officially known as the Central Commission for Guiding Cultural and Ethical Progress, was a commission of the Central Committee of the Chinese Communist Party. It was tasked with educational efforts to help build a spiritual civilization based on socialism and a socialist harmonious society.

== See also ==
- Ideology of the Chinese Communist Party
