= Type 82 artillery =

The Type 82 is a multiple rocket launcher developed by China. It mounts a launcher for Norinco 130 mm. rockets on a 6×6 truck. By 2009, the People's Liberation Army was phasing out 130 mm. rocket systems.

== Operators ==
- China
- Democratic Republic of the Congo
