= Law of the People's Republic of China on the National Emblem =

Standing Committee of the National People's Congress
- Passed by: Standing Committee of the National People's Congress
- Passed: 2 March 1991
- Signed by: President Yang Shangkun
- Signed: 2 March 1991
- Commenced: 1 October 1991
- Introduced by: Council of Chairpersons

Amends
- 2009, 2020
- Status: In force

Law of the People's Republic of China on the National Emblem
- Simplified Chinese: 中华人民共和国国徽法
- Traditional Chinese: 中華人民共和國國徽法
Transcriptions
Standard Mandarin
- Hanyu Pinyin: Zhōnghuá Rénmín Gònghéguó Guóhuī Fǎ

The Law of the People's Republic of China on the National Emblem is a legislation concerning the regulation of the national emblem of the People's Republic of China. It was passed by the Standing Committee of the National People's Congress on 2 March 1991 and came into effect on 1 October 1991.

== Legislative history ==
The National Emblem Law

The draft law was adopted at the 18th meeting of the Standing Committee of the 7th National People's Congress on March 2, 1991, and was officially promulgated by President Yang Shangkun in the Presidential Order No. 41, and came into effect on October 1, 1991. On August 27, 2009, the Law was revised at the 10th meeting of the Standing Committee of the 11th National People's Congress. The full text consists of 15 articles, with instructions for the production of the National Emblem of the People's Republic of China attached. On October 17, 2020, the 22nd Session of the Standing Committee of the 13th National People 's Congress revised the National Emblem Law, and the revised version will come into effect on January 1, 2021.

=== Hong Kong and Macau ===
On July 1, 1997, the NPC Standing Committee incorporated the National Emblem Law into Annex III of the Hong Kong Basic Law. On the same day, the Provisional Legislative Council enacted the National Flag and National Emblem Ordinance, which is the local legislation of the National Emblem Law in Hong Kong. After the NPCSC passed the revised National Emblem Law on October 17, 2020, the Hong Kong government stated that it would make appropriate amendments to the National Flag and National Emblem Ordinance to implement the provisions applicable to the Hong Kong and fulfill its constitutional responsibilities. On September 29, 2021, the Hong Kong Legislative Council passed the National Flag and National Emblem (Amendment) Bill 2021 in its third reading.

Since the enactment of the Macao Basic Law on March 31, 1993, the National Emblem Law has been included in its Annex III. On December 20, 1999, the Legislative Assembly of Macau passed Law No. 5/1999 , which is the local legislation of the National Emblem Law in Macau. On October 23, 2020, the Secretary for Administration and Justice of Macau Cheong Weng Chon responded to reporters' questions at the Executive Council Press Conference and stated that the SAR government will start the work of revising the local laws on the national flag and national emblem. On July 27, 2021, the Macao Special Administrative Region Administrative Regulation "Amendment to Administrative Regulation No. 5/2019 on the Specific Provisions on the Use of the National Flag, National Emblem, Regional Flag, Regional Emblem and the Playing and Singing of the National Anthem" and the Law "Amendment to Law No. 5/1999 on the Use and Protection of the National Flag, National Emblem and National Anthem" came into effect at the same time.
