= Qian Daosun =

Chinese translator and educator

- 钱稻孙
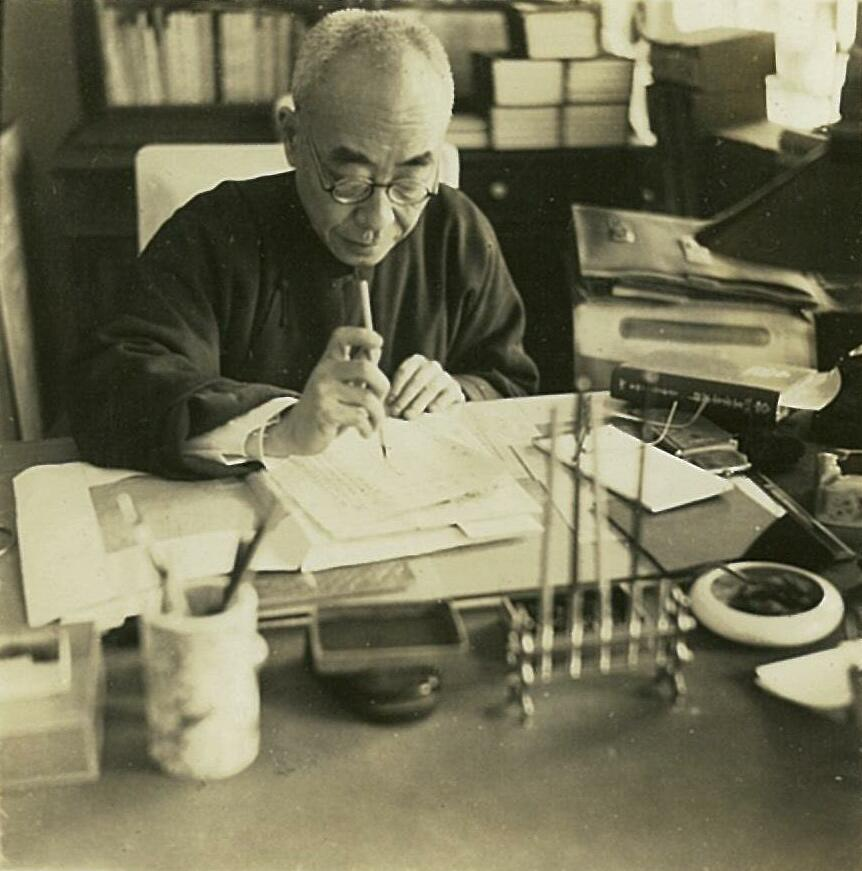
- Born: 1887; Huzhou (Wuxing), Zhejiang
- Died: 1966 (aged 78–79)
- Occupations: Translator, Writer, Teacher, Librarian
- Writing career
- Notable works: Translation: The Tale of Genji, Man'yōshū

Qian Daosun (1887–1966) was a Chinese writer and translator. His renowned translations include the Inferno part of the Divine Comedy, Man'yōshū and The Tale of Genji. Qian was born in a family of officials and scholars.

== Life ==
=== Early life ===
In 1900, when Qian was 13 years old, he went to Japan with his diplomat father, and studied at Keio Yochisha Elementary School, Seijo Gakkou, and Tokyo Koto Shihan Gakkou. Later Qian went to Belgium and Italy with his family and received education first in French, Italian, and later in German and medicine before he returned to China. In 1912, together with Lu Xun and Xu Shoushang, Qian co-designed the Twelve Symbols national emblem. Since 1927, Qian taught Japanese in the Tsinghua University, where he obtained the professor's title in 1931, while also being the head of the university library.

=== Family members ===
Mother: Shan Shili (1856–1943), courtesy name Shouzi, was born in Xiaoshan, Zhejiang. Shan Shili accompanied her husband on several missions since 1899 to countries such as Japan, Russia, the Netherlands, and Italy. And wrote the first Chinese female account of women's experience travelling abroad, Gui Mao Lv Xing Ji (癸卯旅行记 1903). Shan also compiled Gui Qian Ji (归潜记 1910) and The First Edition of the Continuation of the Beautiful Lady's Beginning (清闺秀正始再续集初编 1944).

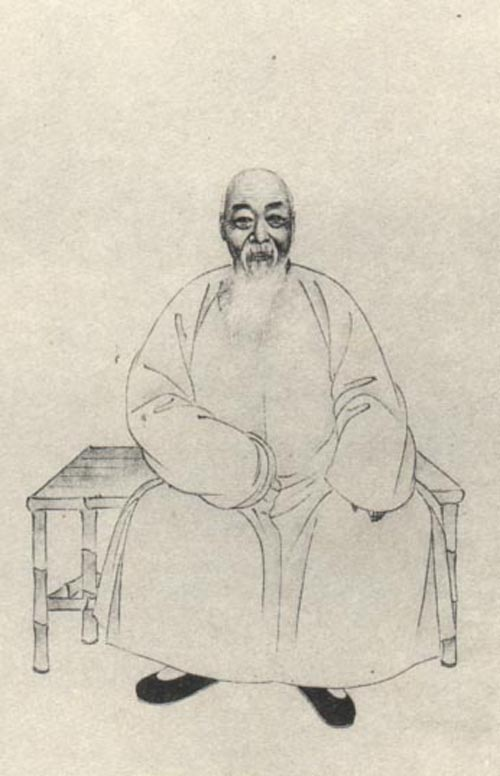
Qian Daosun's father 錢恂

Father: Qian Xun (1854–1927), famous diplomat in the late Qing dynasty. Between 1899 and 1908, Qian Xun was appointed to go to Japan (1899), Russia (1903), the Netherlands (1907), and Italy (1908). In 1912, Qian became the first director of Zhejiang Provincial Library. In 1914, he served as a member of the Senate of the Republic of China and participated in politics. In 1917, Qian Xun worked as the editor at the National History Compilation Office of Peking University.

=== Career life: Ministry of Education ===
Qian Daosun worked at the Ministry of Education of the Beiyang government between 1912 and 1927. Together with Lu Xun and Xu Shoushang, he designed the Twelve Symbols national emblem during his first year in office. In March 1913, the Commission on the Unification of Pronunciation organized by the Ministry of Education passed the proposal, which Qian participated in the drafting, to adopt Jiuwen (later renamed to ‘Zhuyin’) as the system of phonetic symbols to standardize the pronunciation of Mandarin Chinese characters.

Qian Daosun was a colleague and a close friend of Lu Xun between 1912 and 1915. According to Lu Xun's Diary, they also helped prepare the 1914 National Children's Art Exhibition. While Qian was visiting Tokyo in 1916, the correspondence between him and Lu Xun continued via letters and postcards. In August 1917, Qian was appointed to work in the Department of College Education to tackle the difficulties associated with the admission criteria. Qian became an appointed member of the National Anthem Research Committee in December 1919, and the Beiyang government ordered a change of the national anthem to the Song to the Auspicious Cloud in 1921.

=== Career life: Librarian ===
After leaving the Ministry of Education in 1927, Qian Daosun took on different positions at higher education institutions in Beijing, one of which was the lecturer of Japanese language at the National Tsinghua University Library. Between 1913 and 1944, however, Qian also worked at different libraries in Beijing, such as the Capital Library (nowadays the National Library of China) between 1913 and 1914, the National Beijing College of Fine Arts in 1925, and the National Peking University Library in 1931.

In 1936, after completing the handover procedures with Zhu Ziqing, Qian Daosun officially served as the director of the National Tsinghua University Library and facilitated a considerable growth in the number of library collections before the outbreak of the Marco Polo Bridge Incident of the Japanese invasion in July 1937. Qian set up the “Library Director’s Reception Day” to communicate directly with the readers and granted professors the authority to recommend and purchase books on the library's behalf.

According to the recollections of Jin Yuelin, when Qian Daosun worked at the National Tsinghua University Library, he opposed Jin's determination to resist the Japanese invasion as he believed that the Japanese invaders, facing resistance, would be very likely to commit genocide against Chinese people. Between 1940 and 1945, Qian endured the Wang Jingwei Regime and worked as the Secretary to the pseudo-Peking University.

Five years after the Nanjing Massacre took place, Qian Daosun delivered a speech at the National Central University in Nanjing (controlled by Wang Jingwei's regime) in 1943. During his speech, Qian advised the students to be responsible not only for their studies but also for their own health:

“In today's era, unlike how things were in the past, you cannot expect others to pity you when you are sick.” said Qian, “We must know that the right to pity does not belong to the patient but to others. Patients have no right to demand pity from others. We individual persons belong to the country, not to our own. For this reason, I think that significant events in the world should start with self-cultivation. Not only should we have a sound body, but we must also have a sound spiritual self-cultivation. Only then can we be Chinese and make great contributions to the country.”

=== Career life: Professional translator ===
After the founding of the People's Republic of China in 1949, Qian Daosun was first assigned to the Qilu University in Shandong to teach medicine as a retained member in the early 1950s. "I had to carry my own clothes and go to the post alone,” Qian later told his colleague at the People's Literature Publishing House, “but it was much better than living in jail." A few years later, Qian was transferred back to Beijing and worked as an editor at the publishing house of the Ministry of Health. After his retirement in 1956, he worked as a guest interpreter for People's Literature Publishing House. The famous Chinese translator Wen Jieruo said: “apart from Qian Daosun, it is hard to imagine that there is another person who can translate such a difficult academic work into such an easy-to-understand, elegant text”.

== Works ==
=== Design ===
Together with Lu Xun and Xu Shoushang, Qian Daosun designed the Twelve Symbols national emblem (十二章國徽) (1913).

=== Books edited ===
A book on modern Chinese writings (中国现代文读本 1938) is a collection of modern Chinese writings and consists of 20 volumes edited by Qian Daosun, You Bingqi (尤炳圻), and Hong Yanqiu (洪炎秋).

=== Poems written in Jail (1946) ===
In 1946, after the KMT-ruled Nationalist government took control, Qian Daosun was charged with “conspiracy with enemy countries and plotting against one's own country,” sentenced to ten years in prison, and deprived of his civil rights for six years. While Qian was in prison, he sent to his friend the classical-style verses he composed while he was in prison, and three of those poems were published in the newspaper Qiao sheng bao in November.

=== Translation ===
Divine Comedy (神曲一臠 1921)

Qian translated the opening part of Dante's Divine Comedy in the form of Chu Ci and published it in Fiction Monthly.

The Tale of Genji (源氏物語 1957)

He began translating slowly and carefully to interpret The Tale of Genji in 1933. In the 1950s, the People's Literature Publishing Company commissioned Qian to translate The Tale of Genji, but due to his slow writing, Feng Zikai took place instead and became the first translator who translated the whole chapter. In 1957, Kiritsubo (桐壺), translated by Qian, was published in the magazine Yi Wen (譯文). Qian translated the first five chapters, but all but Kiritsubo were lost during the Cultural Revolution. In order to reproduce the atmosphere and stylistic characteristics of the original text, Qian used Written vernacular Chinese.

Man'yōshū (漢譯萬葉集選 1959)

Han yi wan ye ji xuan (漢譯萬葉集選, 1959) is the first Chinese-translated collection of Man'yōshū, edited and translated by Sasaki Nobutsuna and Qian Daosun and proofread by Ichimura Sanjiro, Suzuki Torao, Maekawa Saburo, and others. Translation continued during the Sino-Japanese War, but after the end of the war in 1944, contact between Sasaki and Qian was lost, and publication was postponed. However, the connection was resumed in 1955, and thanks to Kojiro Yoshikawa of Kyoto University, the book was finally published in 1959, with funding from the Japan Society for the Promotion of Science (日本学術振興会). Sasaki and Qian likely met at the first Greater East Asia Literary Conference (第一回大東亜文学者大会) in 1942.

Chikamatsu Monzaemon and Ihara Saikaku senshū (近松門左衛門・井原西鶴選集 1987)

A collection book of Ihara Saikaku's The Eternal Storehouse of Japan (日本永代蔵, Nippon Eitaigura, 1688) and Reckonings that Carry Men Through the World or This Scheming World (世間胸算用, Seken Munesan'yō, 1692) and Chikamatsu Monzaimon's The Love Suicides at Sonezaki (曾根崎心中, Sonezaki shinjū, 1703), The Love Suicides at Amijima (心中天網島, Shinjū Ten no Amijima, 1721), Kagekiyo Victorious (出世景清, Shusse kagekiyo, 1685) and Shunkan. It was published as part of Nihon bungaku sousho (日本文学叢書). Qian's translation was submitted to a publisher in 1963, but due to the chaos and oppression during the Cultural Revolution, it was not published for more than 20 years.

=== Other translations ===
- Jintai kaibougaku vol. 1 (人体解剖学 第一巻 1916)
- Jintai kaibougaku vol. 2 (人体解剖学 第二巻 1916)
- Zoukei bijutsu (造形美術 1924)
- You kao gu xue kan dao de zhong ri wen hua di jiao she (由考古学上看到的中日文化底交涉 1930)
- Ri ben jing shen yu jin dai ke xue (日本精神与近代科学 1937)
- Nihon shika sen (日本詩歌選 1941)
- Bonjuki : youkyoku (盆樹記 : 謡曲 1942)
- Ying hua guo ge hua (樱花国歌话 1943)
- Handcart Songs (荷車の歌 1961)
- Tōa gakkikō (東亜楽器考 1962)
- Wooden puppet joruri (木偶浄瑠璃 1965)
- Screenplay of Rashomon (1979)
