= Twelve Symbols national emblem =

Emblem of the Republic of China (1913–1928)

- Armiger: Republic of China (1913–1928); Empire of China (1915–1916)
- Adopted: February 1913
- Supporters: Chinese dragon, Fenghuang
- Use: 1913–1928

Twelve Symbols national emblem
- Traditional Chinese: 十二章國徽
- Simplified Chinese: 十二章国徽
Transcriptions
Standard Mandarin
- Hanyu Pinyin: Shí'èr zhāng Guóhuī
- Wade–Giles: Shih2-erh4 chang1 kuo2-hui1

Commander-in-Chief Flag of the Republic of China, 1912–1928

The Twelve Symbols national emblem (Chinese: 十二章國徽; pinyin: Shí'èr zhāng Guóhuī) was the state emblem of the Empire of China and the Republic of China from 1913 to 1928. It was based on the ancient Chinese symbols of the Twelve Ornaments.

== History ==
The Empire of China during the Manchu-led Qing dynasty did not have an official state emblem, but the flag featured the azure dragon on a plain yellow field with a red sun of the three-legged crow in the upper left corner. It became the first national flag of China and is usually referred to as the Yellow Dragon Flag.

Following the end of Qing rule, new national symbols were deemed necessary by the leaders to represent the changed circumstances. The renowned writers Lu Xun, Qian Daosun, and Xu Shoushang from the Ministry of Education were tasked with designing a new national emblem. It was presented on August 28, 1912, and was adopted as national emblem in February 1913. President-Emperor Yuan Shikai continued its use during his short imperial reign from 1915 to 1916.

Coins issued during this time feature the emblem. A variation of the emblem was shown on orders and illustrations.

The Northern Expedition led by General Chiang Kai-shek and the Kuomintang party led to the overthrow of the fractious but legitimate Beiyang government in 1928. This ushered in a one-party state under the Kuomintang known as the Nanjing decade. The state emblem was therefore replaced with the Kuomintang party symbol Blue Sky with a White Sun.

== Design ==
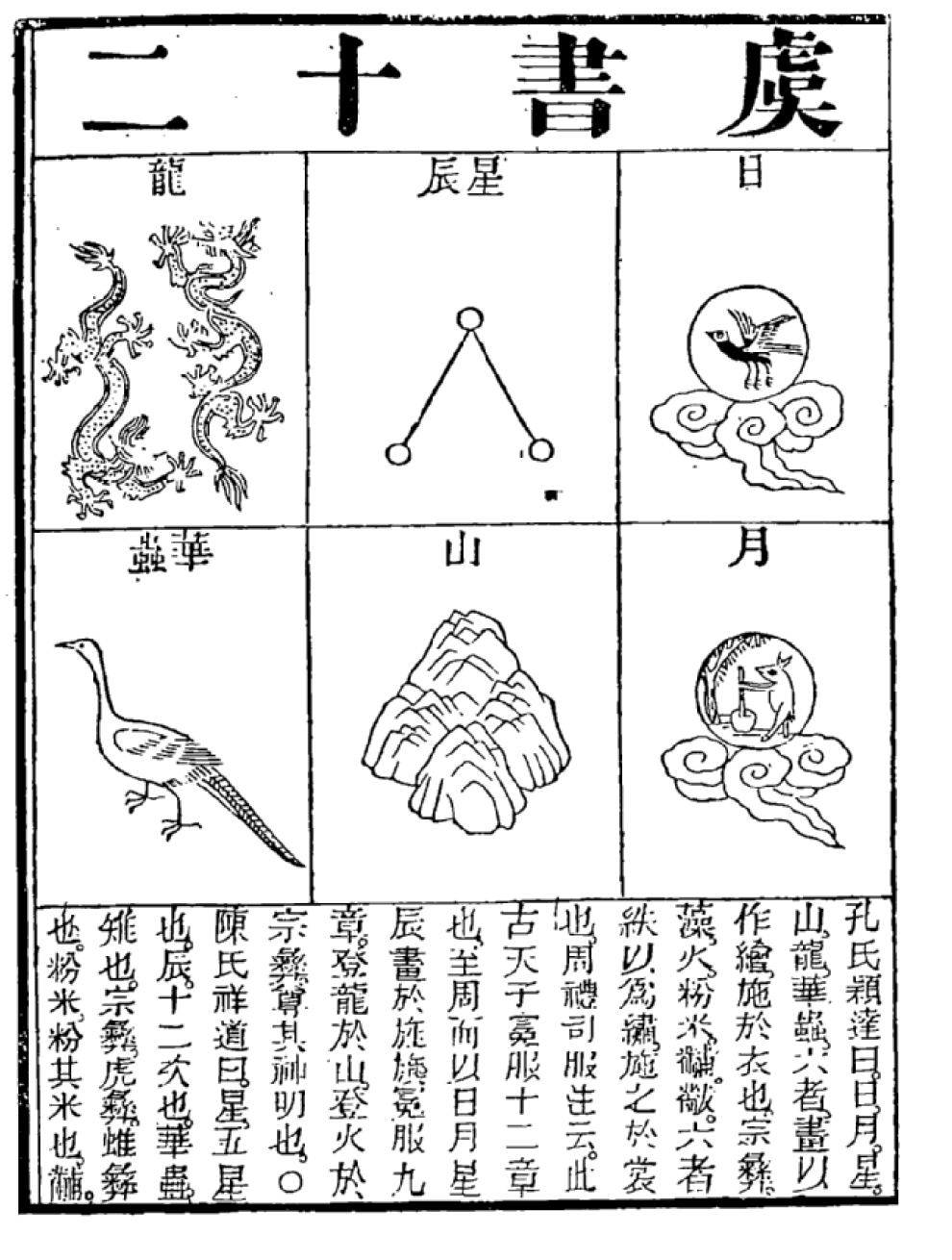

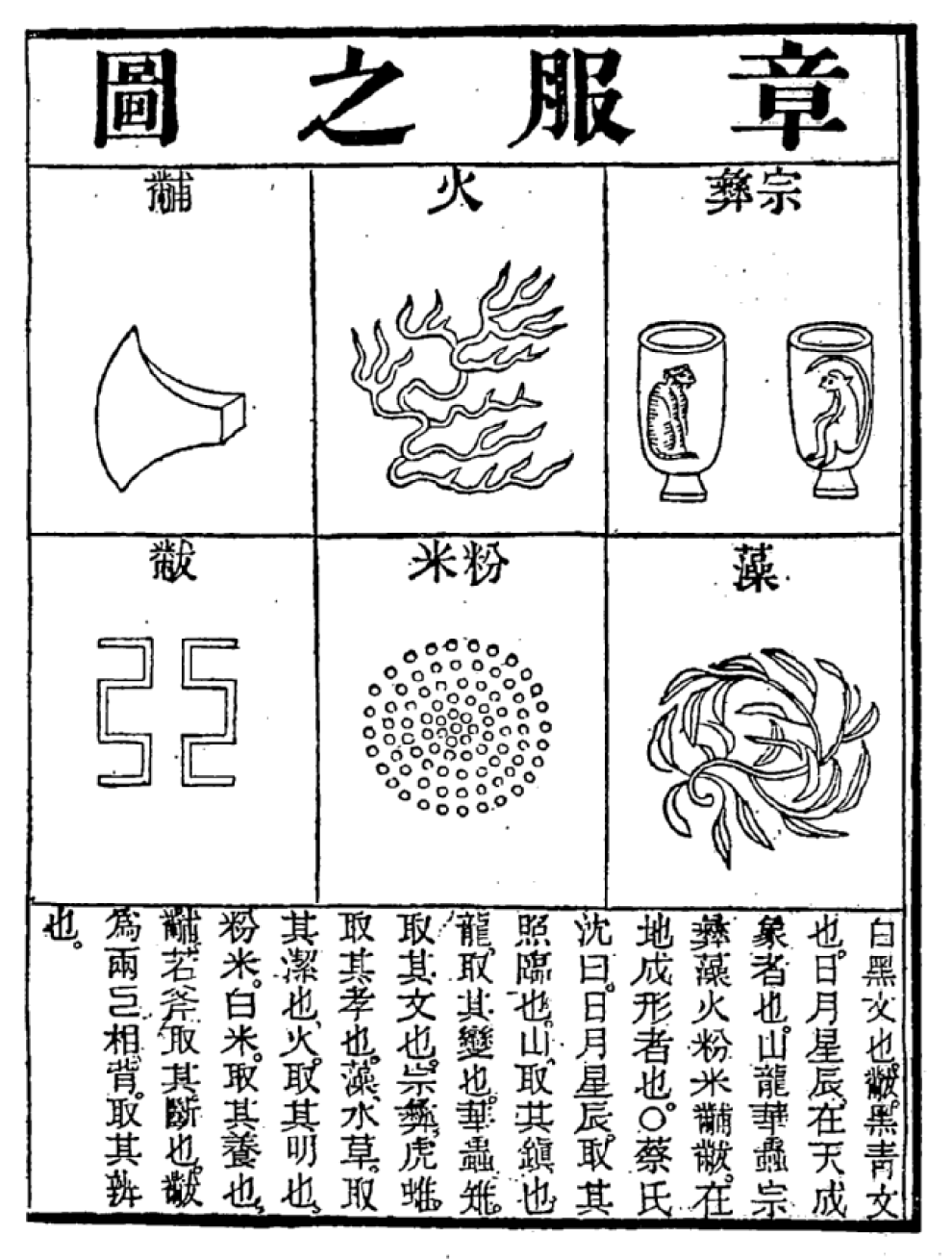

The emblem is based on the ancient symbols of the Twelve Ornaments.

These are first mentioned as already ancient in the Book of Documents by Emperor Shun, who was one of the legendary Three Sovereigns and Five Emperors. Oral tradition holds that he lived sometime between 2294 and 2184 BCE. According to the book, the emperor wished for the symbols to be used on official robes of the state.

The symbols were considered most auspicious and therefore as a set were reserved only for the emperor to be shown on his ceremonial robes.

The national emblem arranges these symbols in such a way to reflect the order of achievement in western heraldry.

== Symbols ==
- The supporter sinister is a dragon, which symbolizes strength and adaptability. The azure dragon already featured on the national flag during the preceding Qing dynasty.
- On the back of the dragon is fire, which symbolises light and brightness.
- Behind the head of the dragon is the crescent moon of the moon rabbit who is constantly pounding the elixir of life.
- The supporter dexter is a fenghuang, or pheasant-phoenix, and represents peace and refinement.
- The phoenix holds pondweed or algae in its right talon, a symbol of purity and brightness.
- Behind its head are three stars, which could be the Fu Lu Shou stars, which symbolise happiness, prosperity and longevity.
- Both creatures hold in one of each claws the zongyi (Chinese: 宗彝), which is a sacrificial cup, symbolising devotion and loyalty.

The dragon and phoenix represent the natural world. In yin and yang terminology, a dragon is male yang and the phoenix a female yin. Therefore, the emperor was often identified as the dragon, while the empress was the phoenix. The inclusion of the phoenix into the national symbol, opposite but equal to the dragon, can be seen as a symbol of women being equal to men, and a visual and poignant representation of women's rights in the new China.

- Featuring as the crest on top is an abstract symbol of the sun of the three-legged crow.
- In the middle functioning as the escutcheon is the axe head, which symbolises courage and resolution, but also executive justice. The blade of the axe head is pointing downwards, the head is shaped like a sloping mountain.
- Overlaid on the axe head are grains of rice, which symbolise nourishment and the country's agriculture. It can also be seen as a symbol of the concept of a moderately prosperous society.
- In the center of the axe head framed by a pentagon is a simplified symbol of a rice ear, which again stresses the importance of agriculture as the basis of the country's wealth and prosperity. The shape on the emblem is based on a carved stone dating to the Han dynasty.
- The downward-pointing blade of the axe head features a hardened edge in shape of the four sacred mountains. These represent tranquility and steadiness. The fifth Center Great Mountain is represented by the axe head.

The mountains represent earth, the cups metal, the pondweed water, the rice grains wood, and fire, which are all representations of wu xing.

- The figure 亞 fu underneath the axe represents two animals with their backside together. This symbolises the capability to make a clear distinction between right and wrong.
- The fu sign is in the middle of complex interlacing ribbons, which connect the dragon, the phoenix and the axe to each other. The ribbons could symbolise Great Unity and Harmonious Society.

== See also ==
- Five Races Under One Union – the national flag and its ideology
- Song to the Auspicious Cloud – the national anthem
