= Long live the Chinese Communist Party =

Political slogan

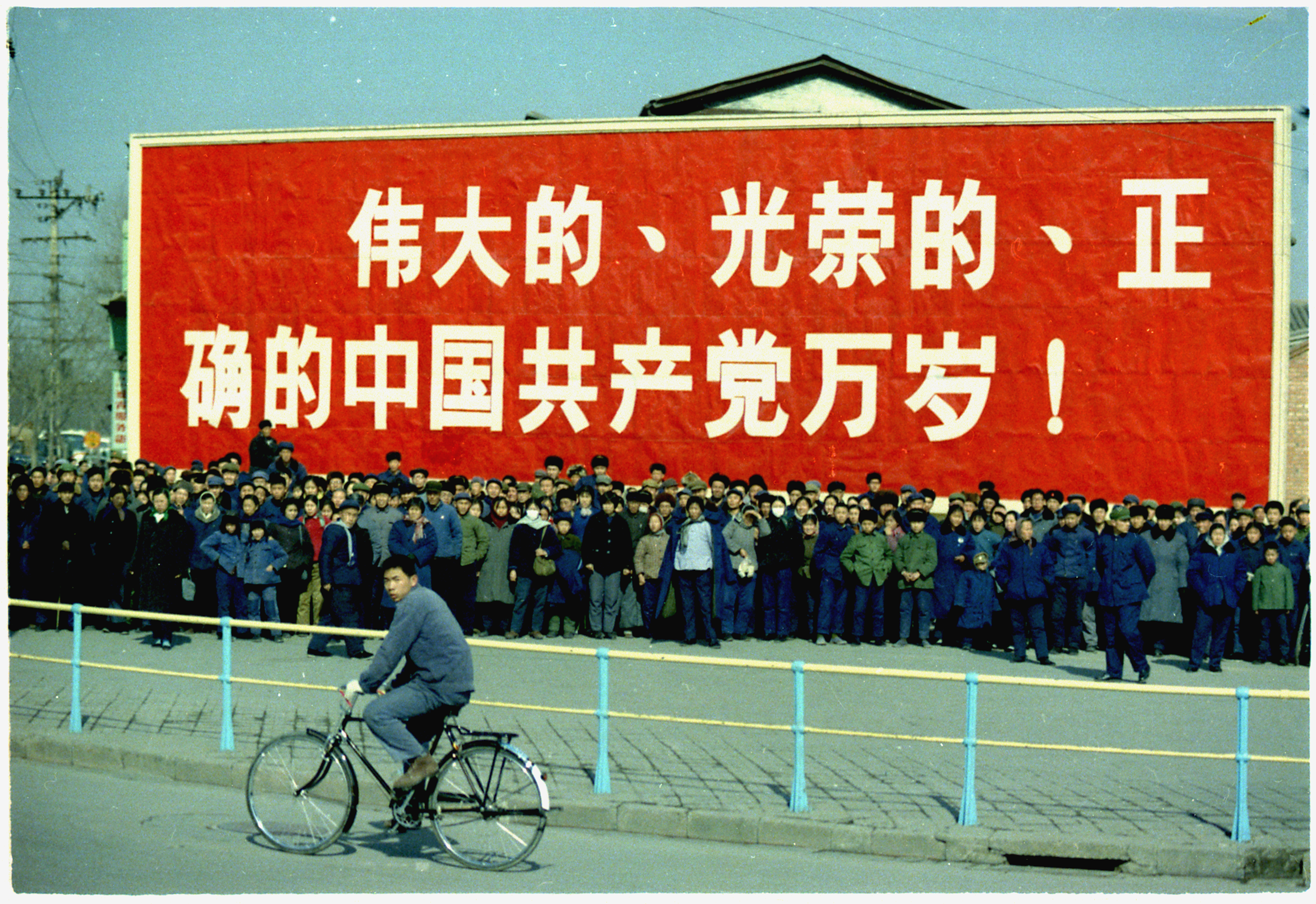
- A propaganda slogan photographed during Nixon's visit to China in 1972: "Long live the great, glorious, and correct Chinese Communist Party!"
- Traditional Chinese: 中國共產黨萬歲
- Simplified Chinese: 中国共产党万岁
Transcriptions
Standard Mandarin
- Hanyu Pinyin: Zhōngguó Gòngchǎndǎng Wànsuì

"Long live the Chinese Communist Party" (Chinese: 中国共产党万岁; pinyin: Zhōngguó Gòngchǎndǎng Wànsuì) is a political slogan in China. It originated from a manifesto issued during the 2nd National Congress of the Chinese Communist Party in July 1922. The slogan and its variations gradually began to be used in various fields as political propaganda slogans.

== Origin ==
The slogan was first used in July 1922, in a manifesto issued at the 2nd National Congress of the Chinese Communist Party, which established the party program of the Chinese Communist Party (CCP):

Down with the warlords!

Down with international imperialism!

Fight for peace!

Fight for freedom!

Fight for independence!

Long live the liberation of oppressed nations!

Long live the Chinese Communist Party!

Long live the Communist International!

== Use ==
=== Manifesto and literature ===
This slogan has been used in documents of the CCP and also became the slogan shouted by revolutionaries before their death.

=== Conferences and festivals ===
The slogan often appears in press releases of major conferences and as slogans at festivals and celebrations.

=== Cultural performances ===
This slogan also appears in some folk art performances, often used to express farmers' praise for the CCP's policies.

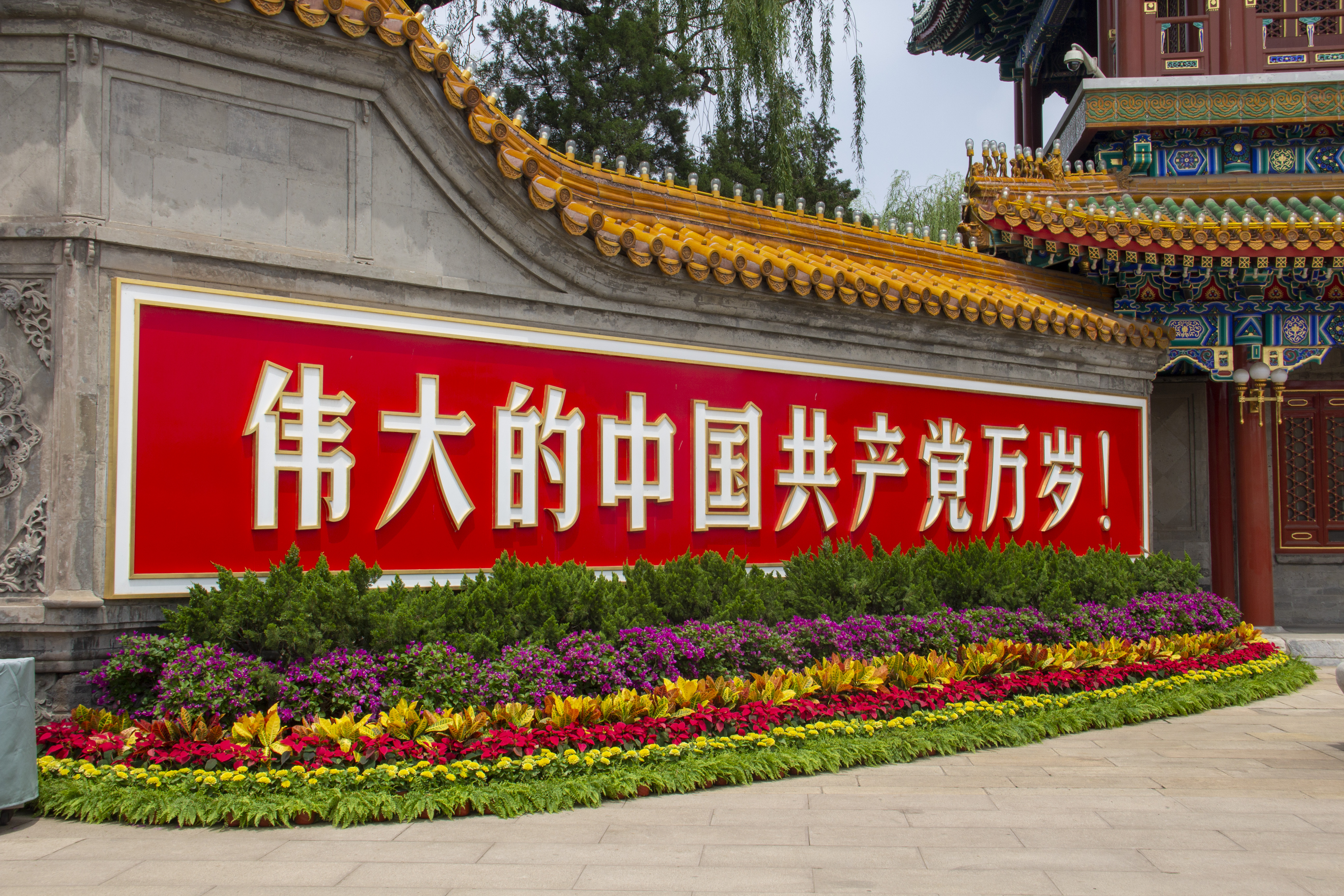
The slogan on the west side of Xinhua Gate reads: "Long live the great Chinese Communist Party!"

=== Buildings ===
- On the walls on both sides of the Xinhua Gate outside Zhongnanhai in Beijing, there are two slogans with white characters on a red background and gold edges: "Long live the great Chinese Communist Party!" and "Long live the invincible Mao Zedong Thought!"
- This slogan is written in neon letters on the top of the Erqi Memorial Tower, a landmark building in Zhengzhou City, Henan Province, which commemorates the Erqi General Strike.

== People who used the slogan ==
=== Ye Jianying ===
After resolving the issue of the arrest of 44 CCP members, including Li Xin, the secretary of Ye Jianying's military adviser Teng Daiyuan, and other members of the Jiefang Daily by the Beijing military police on April 3, 1946, Ye Jianying, the CCP representative of the Military Mediation Executive Department, led the released personnel through West Chang'an Avenue, setting off firecrackers and shouting the slogan.

=== Peng Pai ===
Peng Pai, a former member of the Kuomintang and member of the Politburo at the Sixth CCP National Congress was executed in Shanghai Longhua Prison on August 24, 1929, after his arrest. He sang The Internationale and shouted the slogan when he was executed.

=== Yun Daiying ===
Yun Daiying, a former instructor at the Political Department of the Whampoa Military Academy and an early leader of the CCP who led the Guangzhou Uprising, was arrested in Shanghai in 1930 and shouted the slogan when he was executed in the Nanjing Military Prison.

=== Zhao Shiyan ===
Zhao Shiyan, former member of the Northern Bureau of the CCP Central Committee and uncle of Li Peng, former Premier of the People's Republic of China, who participated in the Northern Expedition of the National Revolutionary Army, was arrested in Shanghai for engaging in secret activities after the April 12 Incident in 1927. When he was executed at Fenglin Bridge in Shanghai, he shouted the slogan.

=== Zhao Yiman ===
Zhao Yiman, a former Whampoa Military Academy alumnus, anti-Japanese fighter, and political commissar of the 2nd Regiment, 1st Division, 3rd Army of the Northeast Anti-Japanese Allied Forces, was captured by the Japanese Kwantung Army and executed outside the Xiaobei Gate of Zhuhe County (now Shangzhi City, Heilongjiang Province ) in 1936. She shouted the slogan at her execution.

=== Students of the 1989 democracy movement ===
On April 27, 1989, during the 1989 student movement, college students in Beijing held a march in Beijing to protest against the "April 26 editorial" published by the People's Daily. During the march, some students raised a banner that read "Long live the honest Chinese Communist Party."

=== Xi Jinping ===
Xi Jinping, General Secretary of the Chinese Communist Party has used the slogan at the end of speeches commemorating the 70th National Day of the People's Republic of China in 2019 and the 100th Anniversary of the Chinese Communist Party in 2021.
