= Xu Shoushang =

Chinese writer (1883–1948)

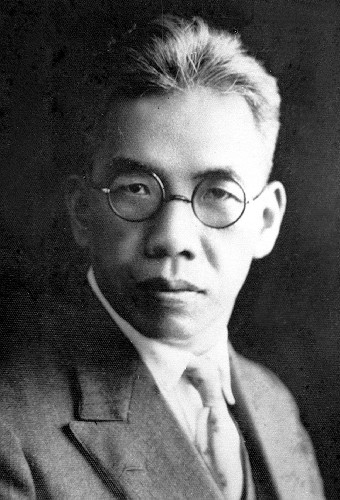
Xu Shoushang

Xu Shoushang (Chinese: 許壽裳; 1883–1948) was a Chinese writer.

He was one of the co-authors of the Twelve Symbols national emblem in 1912.
