= 50th anniversary of the People's Republic of China =

Military parade and event in China

50th anniversary of the founding of the People's Republic of China 庆祝中华人民共和国成立50周年活动
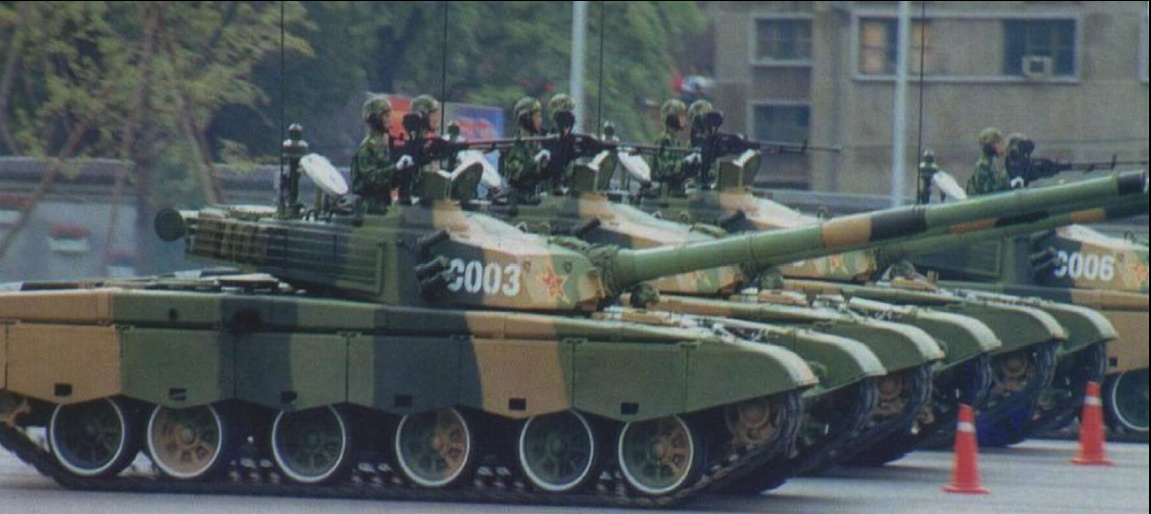
- Type 98 tanks on parade
- Genre: Military parade, mass pageant, music and dance gala
- Date: 1 October 1999
- Frequency: Select years (Note: Since the founding of the people's republic until 2009, the country has held 14 National Day grand military parades in 1949–1959, 1984, 1999, and 2009.)
- Locations: Chang'an Avenue, Tiananmen Square, Beijing, China
- Coordinates: 39°54′26.4″N 116°23′27.9″E
- Years active: 77
- Inaugurated: 1 October 1949
- Previous event: 40th anniversary of the People's Republic of China
- Next event: 60th anniversary of the People's Republic of China
- Participants: National leaders, PLA, PAP, the Militia, and other formations
- Leader: Jiang Zemin (CCP general secretary and CMC chairman)
- People: Li Xinliang (chief commander of the military parade)

The 50th anniversary of the founding of the People's Republic of China took place on 1 October 1999. A military parade was held in Tiananmen Square in Beijing and various celebrations were conducted all over the country. General Secretary of the Chinese Communist Party Jiang Zemin inspected the troops along Chang'an Avenue in Beijing. This parade was immediately followed by a civilian parade.

It was the first one to be held since 1984 since the 1989 parade celebrating the 40th anniversary was cancelled due to the Tiananmen Square protests. Known as the Chinese Army's Trans-Century Parade due to 1 October 1999 being months away from the turn of the 21st century, it was commanded by the Commander of Beijing Military Region Li Xinliang and inspected by then-Chairman of the Central Military Commission and General Secretary of the CCP Jiang Zemin. It was the first time that the sole Chinese leader (who served as party leader, head of state and Commander-in-Chief by this time) had inspected the parade. It was also the first time that the national flag was raised before the parade began. 42 divisions (formations) took part in this parade: 17 from the ground column and 25 from the mobile column.

== Broadcast ==
China Central Television and Beijing Television was responsible for the live broadcast of the National Day celebrations military parade from 8:30 a.m. (CST) to noon, on CCTV-1, CCTV-4 and CCTV HDTV test channel

China National Radio provided live audio coverage throughout mainland China, and "Xinwen Lianbo" anchors Xing Zhibin and Luo Jing served as commentators

== Prelude ==
At 9:58 a.m., CCP Politburo Standing Committee members Jiang Zemin, Li Peng, Zhu Rongji, Li Ruihuan, Hu Jintao, Wei Jianxing, Li Lanqing and other party and state leaders came and stood atop Tiananmen amidst the welcome music.

At 10 a.m., Jia Qinglin, the Beijing municipal Communist Party Secretary and the master of ceremonies for the event, announced the beginning of the "Celebration of the 50th Anniversary of the Founding of the People's Republic of China". A 50-gun salute was fired, and 200 National Flag Guard of the Armed Police marched down from the Monument to the People's Heroes, passing the portrait of Sun Yat-sen and walked along the central axis to the flag-raising area. The Chinese People's Liberation Army Joint Military Band (中国人民解放军联合军乐团) composed of more than 1,100 people played the "National Anthem of the People's Republic of China", and the audience sang in unison. The Five-star red flag was rising and flying high over the square

== Inspection ==
At 10:07 a.m. Chairman of the Central Military Commission Jiang Zemin inspected the troops standing onto a Hongqi CA772TJ limousine with a license 申A 02156 drove out of Tiananmen Gate.

General Li Xinliang, chief commander of the military parade and commander of the Beijing Military Region, took a review car from the East Red Wall to the Jinshui Bridge, and went forward to report to Jiang Zemin:

"Comrade Chairman, the troops under review are ready. Please review them!"

"Start!" Jiang Zemin issued an order. Following an order, more than 1,000 military band members played the "Troops Review March of the PLA"

At 10:08 a.m. the review vehicle drove up to the parade line and drove slowly from west to east. Jiang Zemin reviewed the troops, made out of ground force, navy, air force and militia formations, accompanied by Li Xinliang.

After reviewing the troops, Jiang Zemin returned to the Tiananmen Gate and delivered a speech.

== Military Parade ==
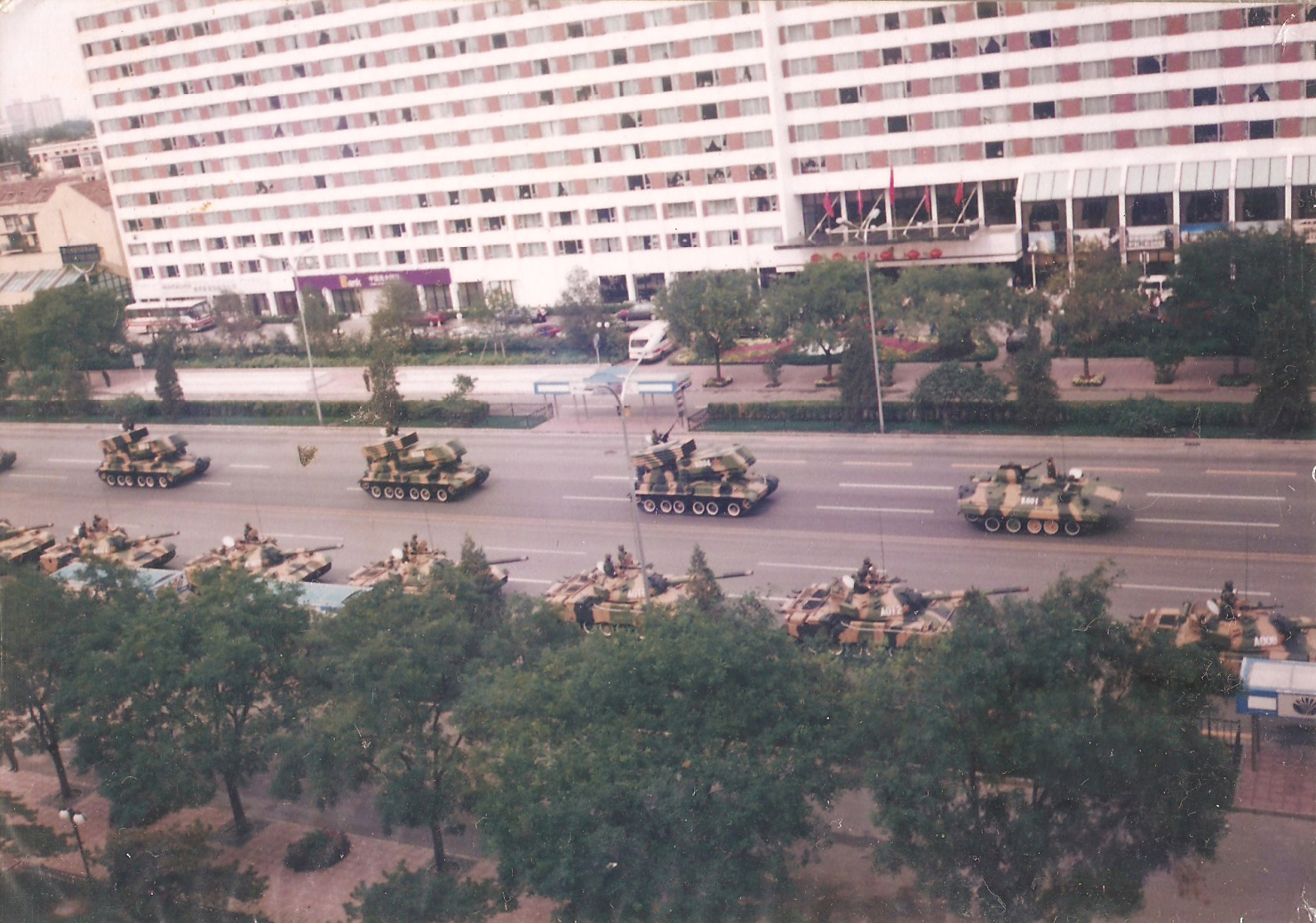
Military vehicles were shown in the celebration of the 50th anniversary.

At 10:36 a.m. Lt.Gen. Chen Xitao announced the start of the Military Parade.

List of participating divisions in the parade

In order of appearance (An italic unit indicates that this is its first appearance)

- PLA Beijing Garrison Honor Guard Battalion (Chinese: 中国人民解放军三军仪仗队)
- PLA National Defence University Cadet Officers (Chinese: 国防大学方队)
- PLA Ground Force Cadet Officers (Chinese: 陆军学员方队)
- PLA Navy Cadet Officers (Chinese: 海军学员方队)
- PLA Air Force Cadet Officers (Chinese: 空军学员方队)
- PLA Ground Force Infantry (Chinese: 陆军一步兵方队)
- PLA Ground Force Second Infantry (Chinese: 陆军二步兵方队)
- PLA Navy Seamen (Chinese: 海军水兵方队)
- PLA Navy Marines Corps (Chinese: 海军陆战队方队)
- PLA Air Force Pilots (Chinese: 空军飞行员方队)
- PLA Air Force Paratroopers (Chinese: 空军空降兵方队)
- PLA Female Soldiers (Chinese: 女兵方队)
- PAP Policemen (Chinese: 人民武警警卫方队)
- PAP Special Police Units (Chinese: 人民武警特警方队)
- PLA Reserve Service Forces (Chinese: 预备役部队方队)
- Male Militia (Chinese: 男民兵方队)
- Female Militia (Chinese: 女民兵方队)

List of military vehicles paraded

The equipment are listed in the order of appearance, with new appearances in italics:

- ZTZ88 main battle tank
- ZTZ96 main battle tank
- ZTZ99/96 main battle tank
- ZBD86 infantry fighting vehicle
- ZBD97 infantry fighting vehicle
- ZSL-92 infantry fighting vehicle
- HJ-9 anti-tank missile system
- PLZ-89 122 mm self-propelled howitzer
- PTZ-89 120 mm tank destroyer
- Type-83 152 mm self-propelled howitzer
- PHZ-89 self-propelled 122 mm multiple rocket launcher
- Type 95 self-propelled anti-aircraft artillery
- PHL-81 self-propelled 122 mm multiple rocket launcher
- PLL01 155mm self-propelled mortar-howitzer
- Type-90 (GDF-002) twin-barreled 35mm anti-aircraft gun
- HQ-7 surface-to-air missile
- HHQ-61/HHQ-7 surface-to-air missile
- YJ-81 anti-ship missile
- HY-2 anti-ship missile
- HQ-2 surface-to-air missile
- S-300 surface-to-air missile
- DF-15 short range ballistic missile
- DF-11 short range ballistic missile
- DF-21 medium range ballistic missile
- DF-31 intercontinental ballistic missile

List of military aircraft paraded

- Xian H-6 strategic bomber
  - along with Chengdu J-7EB fighter
- Xian H-6 strategic bomber
- Xian H-6 refueling aircraft/Shenyang J-8D refueling aircraft
- Xian JH-7 fighter-bomber
- Nanchang Q-5C ground-attack aircraft
- Chengdu J-7D fighter aircraft
- Shenyang J-8 II interceptor aircraft
- Sukhoi Su-27 air superiority fighter
- Harbin Z-9W medium multi-purpose utility helicopter
- Harbin Z-9 medium multi-purpose utility helicopter

Armored forces and artillery accounted for 70% of the parade while the airborne portion was increased to 10%.

== Grand pageant (Mass pageant) ==
After the military parade ended, mass pageant began. The mass pageant consisted of three themes, namely "Founding of the Country and Entrepreneurship", "Reform and Glory", and "Century of Soaring". A total of more than 100,000 people and 91 floats participated in the parade.

== Military bands and parade music ==
=== Military bands in attendance ===
A 1,100 piece band was present for the musical accompaniment to the parade. The bands were organized as follows:

- Massed Joint-PLA Military Band under the direction of the Director of Music of the People's Liberation Army Navy Band, Captain Li Xing
  - Central Military Band of the People's Liberation Army of China
    - State Trumpeters
  - People's Liberation Army Navy Band
  - People's Liberation Army Air Force Female Band
  - People's Armed Police Band
  - Women's Military Band of the PLA National Defense University

=== Music ===
Flag raising, military parade, drive-by, and flyby

1. Welcome March (欢迎进行曲)
2. March of the Volunteers (National Anthem of the People's Republic of China) (义勇军进行曲)
3. Military Anthem of the People's Liberation Army (中国人民解放军进行曲)
4. Troops Review March of the PLA (Inspection March of the PLA) (检阅进行曲)
5. The People's Army is Loyal to the Party (人民军队忠于党)
6. Three Rules of Discipline and Eight Points for Attention (三大纪律八项注意)
7. Military Academy Song (军校之歌)
8. A Soldier of the People (当兵的人)
9. Parade March of the People's Liberation Army (分列式进行曲)
10. March of Armored Vehicles (战车进行曲)
11. March of the Motorized Troops (摩托化部队进行曲)
12. March of the Artillery Force (炮兵进行曲)
13. People's Navy, Marches Forward (人民海军向前进)
14. Rocket Forces March (火箭部队进行曲)
15. March of the PLA Air Force (中国空军进行曲)

Civilian parade

1. Ode to the motherland (歌唱祖国)
2. On the Great Road (我们走在大路上)
3. Without the Communist Party, There Would Be No New China (没有共产党就没有新中国)
4. Story of Spring (春天的故事)
5. On the Field of Hope (在希望的田野上)
6. We Workers Have Strength (咱们工人有力量)
7. Song of the Yangtze (长江之歌)
8. Good Day (好日子)
9. Singing and Dancing People (载歌载舞的人们)
10. Under the Five Rings (五環旗下)
11. China, China, the Bright Red Sun Never Sets (中国, 中国, 鲜红的太阳永不落)
12. Into the New Era (走进新时代)
13. Love My China (爱我中华)
14. Anthem of the Young Pioneers of China (中国少年先锋队队歌)
15. Seven-color Light (七色光)

== Card sequence slogans ==
More than 100,000 teenagers held bouquets and flipped cards in the square, transforming into a variety of characters and patterns.

=== List of card sequence slogans ===
- 国庆 National Anniversary
- National Emblem of the People's Republic of China with 1949 and 1999
- Great Wall
- 中华人民共和国万岁 (Long Live the People's Republic of China)
- Flag of the Chinese People's Liberation Army
- 政治合格 (Political eligibility)
- 军事过硬 (Military excellence)
- 作风优良 (Good style)
- 纪律严明 (Be highly disciplined)
- 保障有力 (Strong Protection)
- Dove of Peace
- 祖国万岁 (Long Live the motherland)
- National Flag of the People's Republic of China
- 改革开放 (Reform and opening-up)
- Five Rings Flag
- 科教兴国 (Science and education strengthens the nation)
- 奔向新世纪 (Towards the new century)
- 民族团结 (National unity)
- 国家统一 (National unification)
- 一国两制 (One country, two systems)
- 和平发展 (Peaceful development)
- 祖国明天更美好 (The motherland will be better tomorrow)

== Videos ==
- Documentary Film: China's 50th National Day Military Parade 1999 PLA August First Film Stu
