= 2015 China Victory Day Parade =

Military parade in Beijing, China

Conference to Commemorate the 70th Anniversary of the Victory of the Chinese People's War of Resistance Against Japanese Aggression and the World Anti-Fascist War 纪念中国人民抗日战争暨世界反法西斯战争胜利70周年大会

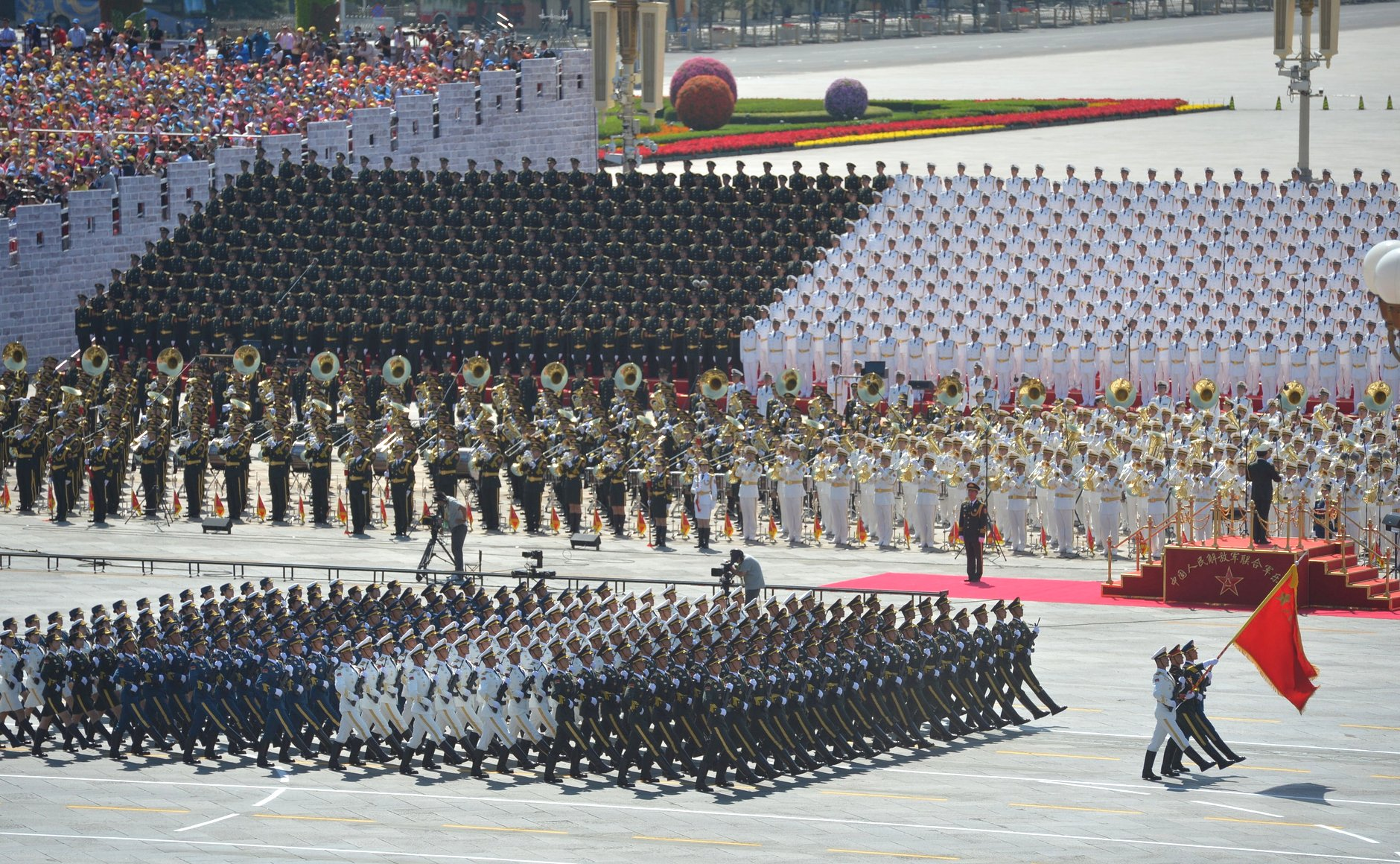
- Genre: Military parade
- Date: 3 September 2015
- Locations: Chang'an Avenue, Tiananmen Square, Beijing, China
- Coordinates: 39°54′26.4″N 116°23′27.9″E
- Next event: 2025 China Victory Day Parade
- General Secretary of the CCP: Xi Jinping (Note: CCP General Secretary Xi Jinping has also served as Chairman of the CCP Central Military Commission, the supreme commander of the armed forces since 2012.)
- People: Li Keqiang (Premier and host)

2015 China Victory Day Parade
- Traditional Chinese: 紀念中國人民抗日戰爭暨世界反法西斯戰爭勝利70週年閱兵式
- Simplified Chinese: 纪念中国人民抗日战争暨世界反法西斯战争胜利70周年阅兵式
- Literal meaning: Parade commemorating 70th anniversary of the victories of Anti-Japanese War of the Chinese people and the World Anti-Fascist War
Transcriptions
Standard Mandarin
- Hanyu Pinyin: jìniàn Zhōngguó rénmín kàngrì zhànzhēng jì shìjiè fǎn fàxīsī zhànzhēng shènglì 70zhōunián yuèbīng shì

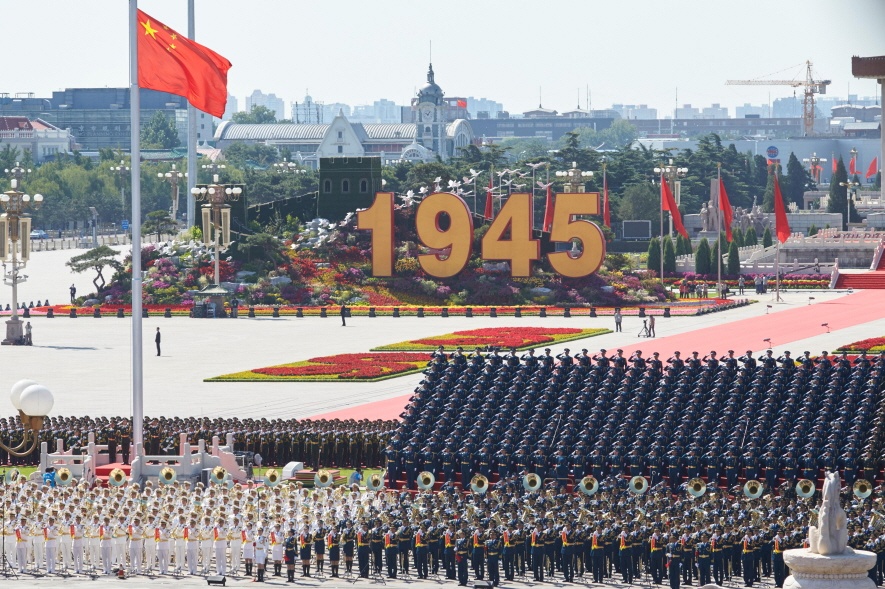
Board showing the year when the Second World War ended.

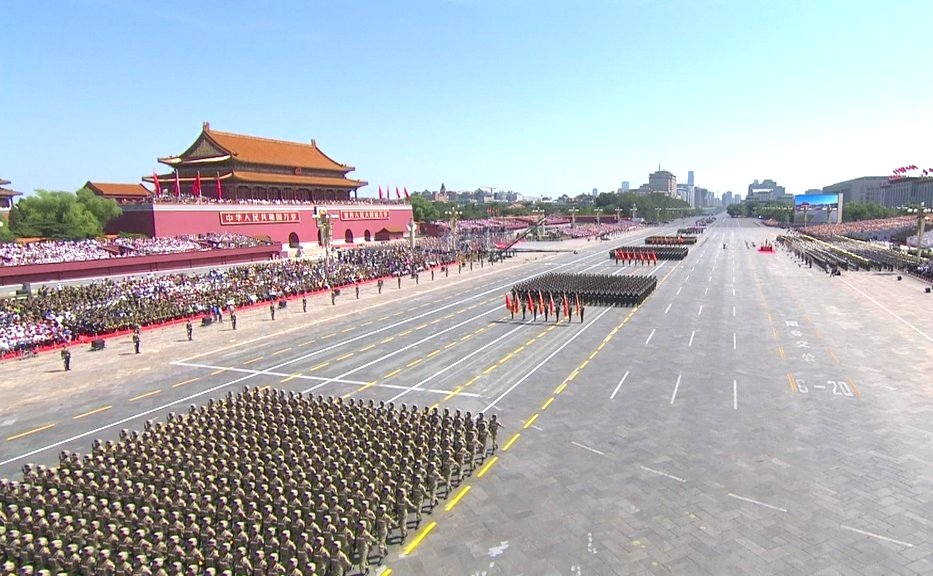
Soldiers marching in the parade

The 2015 China Victory Day Parade was a military parade held along Chang'an Avenue, Beijing, on 3 September 2015 to celebrate the 70th anniversary of Victory over Japan Day of the end of the Second Sino-Japanese War and World War II. The commemoration was the first high-profile military parade held to celebrate an occasion other than the National Day of the People's Republic of China.

12,000 troops of the People's Liberation Army participated in the parade, in addition to over 1,000 troops from 17 countries, and about 850,000 "Citizen Guards" were mobilised to guard the city. Chinese Communist Party general secretary Xi Jinping inspected the troops, Chinese Premier Li Keqiang was the master of ceremonies and General Song Puxuan was the chief commander of the parade.

== Background ==
The 70th Anniversary of V-day parade marked the first time that China held a military parade other than the National Day, and the first to celebrate the end of World War II. Since the founding of the People's Republic of China in 1949, China held parades primarily on 1 October, the country's national day. The most prominent renditions of the parade were held in 1959, 1984, 1999, and 2009, presided over respectively by then leaders Mao Zedong, Deng Xiaoping, Jiang Zemin, and Hu Jintao. The 70th anniversary parade was also the first major parade since Xi Jinping took power as the General Secretary of the Chinese Communist Party (China's top leader) in 2012. The prevailing theme was to be "peace and victory". Xi Jinping had attended the 2015 Moscow Victory Day Parade in May as the guest-of-honour of Russian president Vladimir Putin, and Putin returned the favour at this parade.

== Preparations and restrictions ==
The national leadership placed considerable importance on being able to put the best foot forward and do away with distractions. Bloomberg reported that the central government once again intervened in the stock market to ensure stability ahead of the anniversary; there were traffic curfews and closures of public facilities including seven parks and some hospitals. Line 1, Beijing Subway, which passes underneath Chang'an Avenue, was shut down; 256 bus-lines in Beijing were placed under tight transport restrictions from 2–4 September. On the day of the parade, hospitals restricted most of their activities beyond emergencies, the stock markets were closed. Areas in the city center were placed under martial law, and 850,000 "citizen guards" were deployed to ensure security within the city. The city authorities sent in trained macaques and falcons to make sure the skies over central Beijing were free of birds that would put the flypast at risk. The trained macaque monkeys climbed trees and dismantled birds nests in advance of the parade. Hot air balloons and hang gliders were equally barred from the city; those residing along Chang'an Avenue were forbidden from opening their windows during the lock-down period.

Domestic satellite televisions were restricted from playing entertainment programs between 1–5 September. China Central Television ceased the broadcasting of all entertainment programming, only playing patriotic films and TV series about the Chinese resistance against the Japanese during the Second World War. Xi Jinping decreed the creation of two new public holidays targeted at Japan, the first being 3 September – Victory over Japan Day, officially named The 70th anniversary of Chinese People's Anti-Japanese War and the World Anti-Fascist War Victory Commemoration Day. The second one was declared for 13 December, marking the Japanese takeover of Nanjing, China's then capital under the Nationalists and the Nanking massacre that followed, which resulted in many Chinese deaths by Japanese military personnel garrisoned in the city. The CY Leung administration in Hong Kong argued for a holiday to facilitate participation in commemorative events, thus it tabled the "Special Holiday (3 September 2015) Ordinance" – designating the day as a one-off holiday – for debate in the Legislative Council of Hong Kong (LegCo) in July. The act passed despite strong resistance and more than 90 amendments from one legislator.

Air pollution was reduced during the parade.

To reduce air pollution and ensure blue skies for the parade, half of Beijing's cars were barred from the streets and nearly 10,000 industrial firms in Beijing and in areas near and far – Hebei, Tianjin, Shanxi, Inner Mongolia, Shandong and Henan – suspended or cut production starting on 20 August to cut down on emissions. The factory shut-downs and road closures gave rise to rare instance of clean air, where PM2.5 measurements were below 50, and the lack of traffic jams, and these were welcomed by residents of the capital. Observers noted that the umbrella, which became iconic in Hong Kong during the protests in 2014, were nowhere to be seen despite the blazing heat although commonly used as a shield against the sun in China.

== Leaders in attendance ==
=== Chinese leaders ===
Xi Jinping, who holds the posts for the General Secretary of the Chinese Communist Party (paramount leader) and Chairman of the Central Military Commission (supreme commander), was the central figure of the day's events. Premier Li Keqiang was the master of ceremonies for the parade, breaking convention from its two previous renditions of the parade, which were both hosted by the Communist Party Secretary of Beijing (Jia Qinglin in 1999 and Liu Qi in 2009). General Song Puxuan, Commander of the Northern Theater Command, greeted Xi in front of Tiananmen at the start of the parade during the inspection segment, declaring the readiness of the troops for the marchpast.

Atop Tiananmen, Xi Jinping wore a Mao suit, as was customary for leaders inspecting troops at military parades; his wife Peng Liyuan wore a red dress. The remaining political figures wore business suits. Xi delivered the keynote address at the parade with an unexpected announcement of a plan to cut 300,000 personnel from the Chinese military. The other members of the CCP Politburo Standing Committee, Zhang Dejiang, Yu Zhengsheng, Liu Yunshan, Wang Qishan, and Zhang Gaoli, watched the parade on top of Tiananmen Gate.

Former paramount leaders Jiang Zemin and Hu Jintao; former Premiers Li Peng, Zhu Rongji and Wen Jiabao; and other former senior leaders Li Ruihuan, Wu Bangguo, Jia Qinglin, Li Lanqing, Song Ping, Zeng Qinghong, Wu Guanzheng, Li Changchun, Luo Gan, and He Guoqiang, also attended the parade at Tiananmen. This meant that all former members of the Standing Committee who were in good standing with the party and alive at the time of the parade attended the event; they sat in strict protocol sequence to the right of the members of the incumbent Politburo Standing Committee.

Hong Kong Special Administration Region chief executive Leung Chun-ying also led a 300-person group at the parade, and Macau Chief Executive Fernando Chui also attended.

Foreign dignitaries attending the ceremony China Attendance by head of state or government Attendance by legislature speaker or deputy prime minister Attendance by high-level representative No official representatives

=== List of dignitaries in attendance ===
- Legislative chairman Abdelkader Bensalah of Algeria.
- Vice President Amado Boudou of Argentina.
- Minister for Veterans' Affairs Michael Ronaldson of Australia.
- President Alexander Lukashenko of Belarus.
- Chairman of the Presidency Dragan Čović of Bosnia and Herzegovina.
- Minister of Defence Jaques Wagner of Brazil
- King Norodom Sihamoni of Cambodia.
- First Vice President Miguel Díaz-Canel of Cuba.
- President Miloš Zeman of the Czech Republic.
- President Joseph Kabila of the Democratic Republic of the Congo.
- Member of the Politburo Presidium Choe Ryong-hae of North Korea.
- President Abdel Fattah el-Sisi of Egypt.
- Prime Minister Hailemariam Desalegn of Ethiopia.
- President Jioji Konrote of Fiji
- Foreign Minister Laurent Fabius of France.
- Chief Executive Leung Chun-ying of Hong Kong
- Minister of Foreign Affairs Péter Szijjártó of Hungary.
- Parliament Speaker Ali Larijani of Iran
- Foreign Minister Paolo Gentiloni of Italy.
- President Nursultan Nazarbayev of Kazakhstan.
- President Almazbek Atambayev of Kyrgyzstan.
- President and General Secretary Choummaly Sayasone of Laos.
- Chief Executive Fernando Chui of Macau
- President Tsakhiagiin Elbegdorj of Mongolia.
- President Filip Vujanovic of Montenegro
- President Thein Sein of Myanmar.
- Minister of State Herman Tjeenk Willink of the Netherlands.
- President Mamnoon Hussain of Pakistan.
- Marshal of the Sejm (speaker) Małgorzata Kidawa-Błońska of Poland.
- President Mahmoud Abbas of Palestine
- Governor General Michael Ogio of Papua New Guinea.
- President Vladimir Putin of Russia.
- President Park Geun-hye of South Korea.
- President Tomislav Nikolić of Serbia.
- President Jacob Zuma of South Africa.
- President Omar al-Bashir of Sudan.
- Deputy Chair of Junta Prawit Wongsuwan of Thailand.
- President Emomali Rahmon of Tajikistan.
- (Timor-Leste) President Taur Matan Ruak of East Timor.
- President Islam Karimov of Uzbekistan.
- Ambassador Max Baucus of the United States.
- Prime Minister Sato Kilman of Vanuatu.
- President Nicolás Maduro of Venezuela.
- President Trương Tấn Sang of Vietnam.

The following countries sent their former leaders to the parade :

- Former Chancellor Gerhard Schröder of Germany.
- Former Prime Minister Tony Blair of the United Kingdom.
- Former Prime Minister Tomiichi Murayama of Japan. He ultimately skipped the parade due to health concerns.
- Former President Joseph Estrada of the Philippines. Estrada attended the parade, not as a representative of his country but as part of his duties as Mayor of Manila. Estrada cited the fact that Manila and Beijing were sister cities as his reason for attending the event.
- Former Captain Regent Gianfranco Terenzi of San Marino.
- Former Deputy Prime Minister Wong Kan Seng of Singapore
- Former Vice President and Premier Lien Chan of the Republic of China (Taiwan)
- (Timor-Leste) Former President José Ramos-Horta of East Timor

Leaders of the following international organizations were in attendance:

- Director-General Irina Bokova of the UNESCO
- Secretary-General Ban Ki-moon of the United Nations.
- President Peter Maurer of the International Committee of the Red Cross

In addition, many embassies around Beijing also sent their defense attaches and military generals to attend the parade.

== Criticisms ==
Taiwan's Mainland Affairs Council, President Ma Ying-jeou and his Kuomintang objected to the event and what they see as the CCP usurping credit for leading the Chinese defense against Japan during World War II. However, former Chairman of the Kuomintang Lien Chan also attended the parade, ostensibly in his personal capacity, sparking controversy at home. Whilst Tsai Ing-wen, leader of the Taiwanese opposition, criticized Lien for failing to represent the views of the majority of Taiwanese, observers noted that Lien had considerable business interests on the mainland he sought to protect, likewise the Kuomintang also had interests on the mainland. Hong Kong commentator Frank Ching added that Lien Chan's presence at the ceremony undermined the KMT, as China appeared to erase the role of the Nationalists in defending China.

Other pundits said that the main object of the parade was to rewrite history and elevate the CCP's position in ending the war.

Kyodo News Agency cited a US department of State spokesman that United States objected the President of Sudan Bashir to attend the parade in the news conference held on 31 August 2015. He stated that China should consider about the international society's worry as a UN security council member with inviting or assisting someone who is wanted under the document of warrant signed by ICC.

== Parade groups ==
Some 12,000 troops marched along Chang'an Avenue up to Tiananmen for inspection by Chinese leader Xi Jinping and the two living former leaders Jiang Zemin and Hu Jintao. There were 10 squads: 9 from the People's Liberation Army and 1 from the People's Armed Police). Each squad had 350 soldiers excluding the color guards, and were led by two major generals or lieutenant generals in active service. In total, 56 generals participated in the event. The military vehicle contingent were led by two Air Force lieutenant generals, a vice admiral and a lieutenant general of the People's Liberation Army Rocket Force: Tian Zhong, deputy commander of the PLA Navy, Chen Dong, deputy commander of the PLA Air Force, Wu Guohua, deputy commander of the PLA Rocket Force. Zheng Qunliang another deputy commander of the Air Force, commanded the squadron of jet fighters in the air. This was the first time in PRC's history that military parade contingents were led by officers ranked as high as lieutenant general.

=== Veterans ===
Surviving soldiers from the Second World War joined the parade for the first time. They had fought under various commands, including the New Fourth Army, the National Revolutionary Army, and the Eighth Route Army, with most over 90 years old then. Some of the passed soldiers' widows marched in place of their husbands. Besides Chinese soldiers, some surviving airmen of United States Air Force who had fought alongside Chinese forces also joined the veterans column. The veterans rode in open-top buses at the start of the parade and were escorted by the People's Armed Police Motorcycle Escort Squadron.

=== Marchpast columns ===
==== Military bands in attendance ====
A 1,000 piece band was present to provide musical accompaniment to the parade. The bands were organized as follows:

- Massed Joint-PLA Military Band under the direction of the Director of Music of the PLA Band, Zhang Haifing
  - Central Military Band of the People's Liberation Army of China
    - State Trumpeters
  - People's Liberation Army Navy Band
  - People's Liberation Army Air Force Female Band
  - People's Armed Police Band
  - Women's Military Band of the PLA National Defense University
  - 4th Military Band of the PLA
  - 14th Group Army Band
  - PLA Combined Chorus
    - Central Military Commission Political Work Department Song and Dance Troupe
    - Male singers who are students at Chinese military academies

==== Color party ====
The color guard consisted of 207 men and women from the PLA Honor Guard Battalion, who escorted the national military colours. This marked the first occasion of female service personnel forming part of the honor guard during a national parade. Their first public presentation occurred during the state visit of the President of Turkmenistan to Beijing in May 2015, using the Type 56 ceremonial rifle.

==== Representative companies from CCP units of the Second Sino-Japanese War ====
The CCP's hero squads consisted of detachments that traced their lineage to units that participated in the war against Japan, which included the "Five Heroes of Langya Mountain" (狼牙山五壮士), "Battle of Pingxingguan Hero Squad", and the "Hundred Regiments Offensive Hero Squad". Representative detachments from each Chinese military region participated in the parade, led by soldiers carrying standards used by the predecessor units.

These represented the following CCP formations during the war against Japan:

- Eighth Route Army
- New Fourth Army
- Northeast Anti-Japanese United Army
- Southern China guerrilla organizations under CCP control

==== People's Armed Police ====
A detachment of the People's Armed Police also participated in the parade, the unit having previously been part of the PLA. The unit's lineage, through the 114th Division of the 38th Army, can also be traced to regiments that fought during the war.

==== Foreign contingents ====
Countries whose troops participated in the 2015 China Victory Day Parade

Groups from 17 countries were sent to take part in the military parade. Marching in alphabetical order these were:

1. (Islamic Republic of Afghanistan) Afghanistan – 3-man team from the Color Guard of the Afghan National Army
2. Belarus – 76-man team from the Honor Guard Battalion of the Minsk Garrison
3. Cambodia – 7-man team from the Color Guard of the Royal Cambodian Army
4. Cuba – 76-man team from the Ceremonial Unit of the Cuban Revolutionary Armed Forces
5. Egypt – 73-man team from the Egyptian Republican Guard
6. Fiji – 7-man team from the Presidential Guard
7. Kazakhstan – 76-man team from the Honor Guard Company of the Ministry of Defense of Kazakhstan
8. Kyrgyzstan – 76-man team from the Kyrgyz National Guard
9. Laos – 7-man team from the Color Guard of the Lao People's Army
10. Mexico – 77-person team of cadets of the service academies of the Mexican Armed Forces
11. Mongolia – 74-man team of personnel of the Ministry of Defence of Mongolia
12. Pakistan – 79-man team from the Pakistani Tri-Service Honour Guard
13. Serbia – 75-man team from the Serbian Guards Unit
14. Tajikistan – 76-man team from the Honor Guard Company of the Ministry of Defense of Tajikistan
15. Vanuatu – 7-man team from the Color Guard from the Vanuatu Mobile Forces
16. Venezuela – 9-man team from the Color Guard from the Military Academy of the Bolivarian Army
17. Russia – 76-man team from the 1st Honor Guard Company, 154th Preobrazhensky Independent Commandant's Regiment, Western Military District

=== Mobile column ===
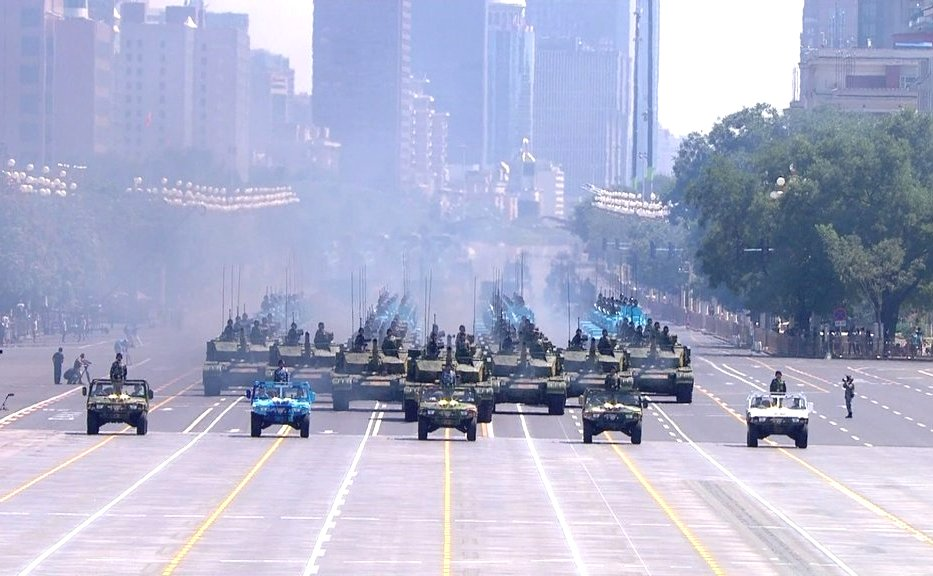
Military vehicles in Victory Day Parade

Type 99A Main Battle Tank

A group of the latest model of China's Type 99 main battle tank. The A marks the last iteration of the Type 99 as the tank is near finalization.

Amphibious squad

On parade where the infantry fighting vehicle (ZBD-05A) and fire support variants (ZTD-05) of the People's Liberation Army Marine Corps ZBD2000 vehicle, with an ability to plane when waterborne these are the fastest amphibious armoured fighting vehicles in the world.

Mechanised infantry combat vehicle squad

The ZBD-04A infantry fighting vehicle, a troop carrying counterpart to the Type 99 MBT was paraded.

Air-mobile infantry fighting vehicle squad

The ZBD-03 IFV is a light airmobile infantry fighting vehicle (IFV) and the most mobile IFV of China's People's Liberation Army, was displayed for the first time in the parade. Anti-tank missile and Light Assault Vehicles variants. came afterward.

Anti-tank guided missile squad

Self-propelled Red Arrow 10 anti-tank guided missile vehicles with anti-helicopter-warfare, fire and forget and man-in-the-loop capabilities were also paraded.

Self-propelled artillery squad

A group of PLZ-05A (1×155MM Howitzer) and PGZ-07 (2×35×228MM Oerlikon KDA guns) self-propelled guns, often nicknamed the "God of War" considering that they are the biggest guns in the Chinese military.

Wheeled amphibious fire support vehicle
Wheeled fast light patrol/attack vehicle
Wheeled anti-terrorism attack vehicle

Self-propelled anti-aircraft gun squad

The missile squad

DF-21D, the world's first Anti-Ship Ballistic Missile, was on display in the parade. They came immediately after the DF-15 and DF-16 missiles.

The DF-41, reportedly China's newest ICBM, was not shown in the parade.

=== Flyby ===
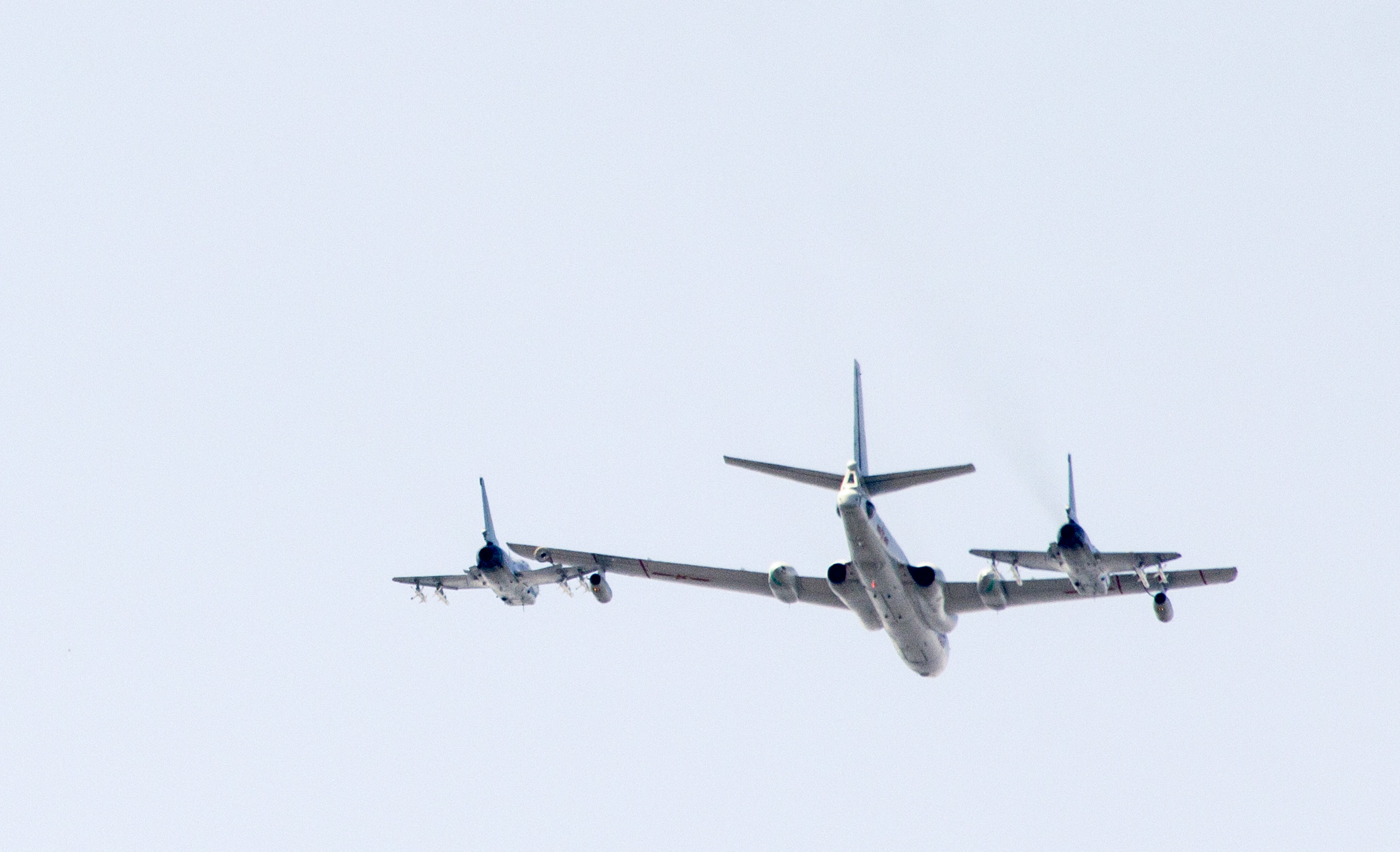
The H-6 and J-10 were flying in the parade.

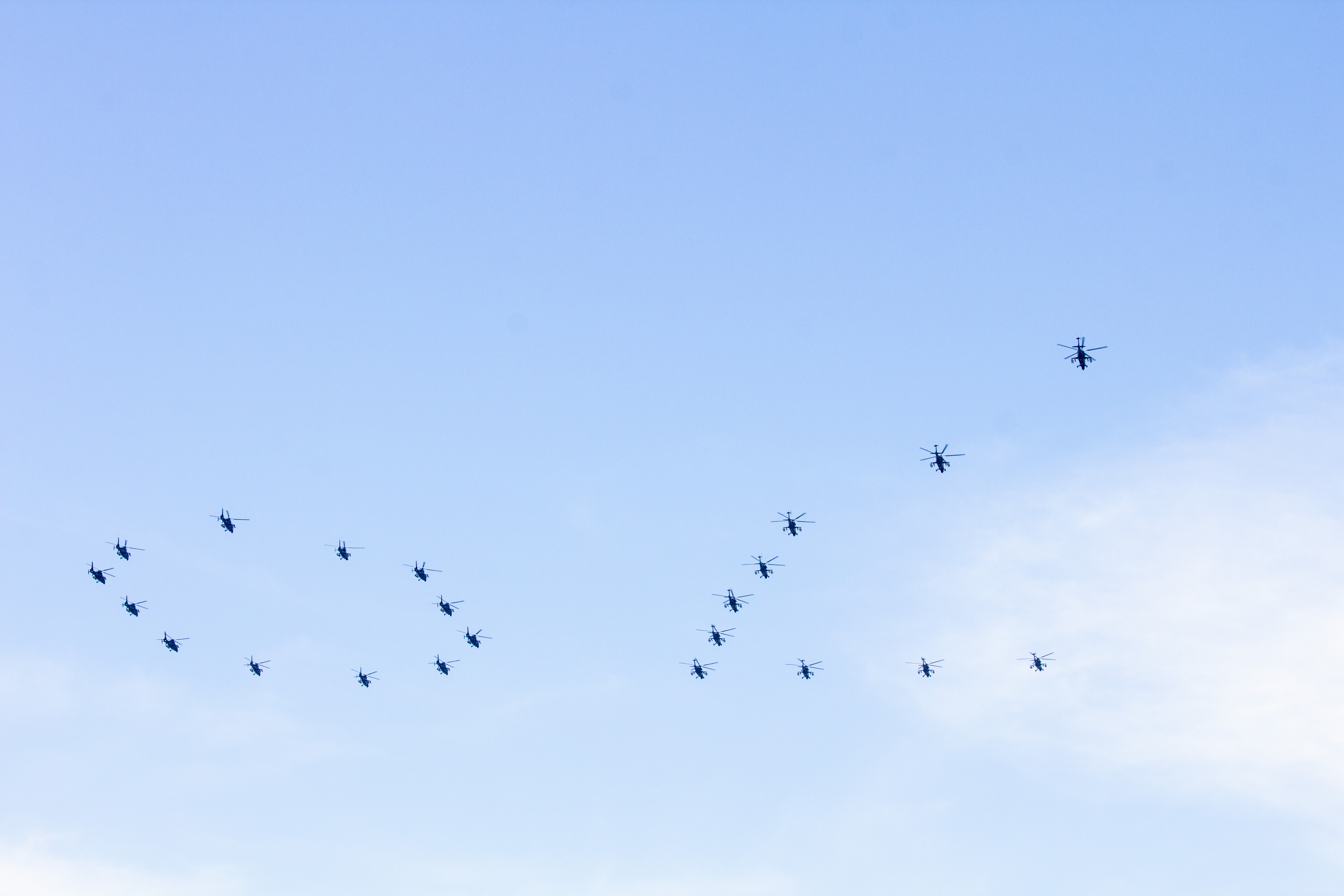
Formation Flying in "70" formation

Fighter jet squad

The squad included 1 KJ-2000 and 8 J-10. They were first displayed in 2009 China's National Day Parade.

China's newest early warning plane, the KJ-500, was displayed for the first time in this parade.

The H-6K was debuted as well.

5×Shenyang J-15, a carrier-based fighter jet, was also debuted in this parade.

China's most advanced fighter jet, the J-20, was not shown in the parade.

Helicopter Squad

8×WZ-10 (7) and 12×WZ-19 (0) helicopters formed the number "70" in the sky at 10:20 to mark the 70 years since the Victory over the Japanese.
