= Jiangshan (song) =

Song
- Released: 2003

"Jiangshan" (Chinese: 江山) is a song about the leadership of Hu Jintao, with lyrics by Xiao Guang and music by Yin Qing. It was used as the theme song for the TV series of the same name, "Jiangshan", and was sung by Peng Liyuan. It won the Outstanding TV Series Song Award at the 24th (2003) China TV Drama Feitian Awards.

The song aims to praise the close relationship formed between the Chinese Communist Party and the Chinese people ("ordinary people" in the lyrics) from "conquering the world" to "sitting on the throne", and highlights the fourth generation of the CCP central leadership with Hu Jintao as general secretary.

== Performance occasions ==
As a typical red song since the 21st century, it has been sung on many occasions such as Party Day and National Day.

- 2004 China Central Television Spring Festival Gala
- 2009 Capital's Celebration of the 60th anniversary of the People's Republic of China
- 2011 Gala Celebrating the 90th anniversary of the Chinese Communist Party: Our Flag
- 2012 Military and Civilian New Year Gala
- 2019 Celebration of the 70th anniversary of the People's Republic of China
