= 40th anniversary of the People's Republic of China =

The 40th Anniversary of the Founding of The People's Republic of China 庆祝中华人民共和国成立40周年大会
- Genre: music and dance gala
- Date: 29 September–1 October 1989
- Locations: Great Hall of the People and Tiananmen Square, Beijing, China
- Coordinates: 39°54′26.4″N 116°23′27.9″E
- Years active: 77
- Inaugurated: 1 October 1949
- Previous event: 35th anniversary of the People's Republic of China
- Next event: 50th anniversary of the People's Republic of China
- Leader: Jiang Zemin (General Secretary of the Chinese Communist Party)
- People: Jiang Zemin and other party and state leaders and more than 10,000 people from all walks of life in the capital

The 40th anniversary of the founding of the People's Republic of China took place on 1 October 1989. The event was held at the Great Hall of the People and Tiananmen Square in Beijing, More than 10,000 party and state leaders and people from all professions in the capital attended the event. Due to the 1989 Tiananmen Square protests and massacre that year, the planned National Day military parade was cancelled.

At 3 p.m., Jiang Zemin, General Secretary of the Chinese Communist Party, Yang Shangkun, President of the PRC, Li Peng, Premier of the PRC, Wan Li, Chairman of the Standing Committee of the National People's Congress, Qiao Shi, Secretary of the Central Commission for Discipline Inspection, Yao Yilin, Vice Premier of the PRC, Song Ping, Director of the CCP Organization Department, Li Ruihuan, Secretary of the CCP Secretariat, State Vice President Wang Zhen and other party and state leaders came to the Great Hall of the People. Yang Shangkun, President of the People's Republic of China, announced the start of the "Celebration of the 40th Anniversary of the Founding of the People's Republic of China".

Subsequently, CCP General Secretary Jiang Zemin delivered a speech. He pointed out that it is necessary to prevent and correct the problem of unfair social distribution. And it is proposed to strengthen the party building, so that the adherence to the four basic principles and the adherence to reform and opening up are unified.

On the evening of 1 October 1989, people from all professions in the capital also held a "Gala Party for Celebrating the 40th Anniversary of the Founding of the People's Republic of China" in Tiananmen Square. In the front of the Gate, a large national flag with the year number "1949" and "1989" on both sides was displayed. The Military Band of the Chinese People's Liberation Army played the "National Anthem of the People's Republic of China".
