= Victory over Japan Day (China) =

Public holiday in China

Victory Day of the Chinese People's War of Resistance Against Japanese Aggression
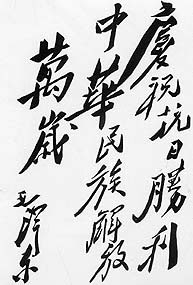
- Mao Zedong's inscription published in the Xinhua Daily on September 3, 1945: "Celebrate the victory of the War of Resistance Against Japan, long live the liberation of the Chinese nation."
- Official name: 中国人民抗日战争胜利纪念日
- Observed by: China
- Date: 3 September
- Duration: one day
- Frequency: Annually
- First time: 1945 (81 years ago)
- Related to: Second Sino-Japanese War; Victory over Japan Day

The Victory Day of the Chinese People's War of Resistance Against Japanese Aggression (Chinese: 中国人民抗日战争胜利纪念日) is the official name given by the government of the People's Republic of China to the anniversary of the victory over Japan in World War II and end of the Second Sino-Japanese War. Since 1951, it has been celebrated on September 3 of each year by the State Council and is a statutory holiday.

== History ==
On 15 August 1945, the Japanese government declared unconditional surrender to the Allies, but the formal legal surrender procedure had not yet been completed. On 2 September 1945, the signing ceremony of Japan's surrender was officially held on the battleship USS Missouri in Tokyo Bay. Japanese Foreign Minister Mamoru Shigemitsu and Chief of the General Staff Yoshijiro Umezu signed the surrender document on behalf of the Japanese government. General Xu Yongchang, then the Chinese representative, then signed the surrender document on behalf of the Republic of China (ROC), ending the Second Sino-Japanese War.

On the same day that the Japanese government signed the surrender document, the ROC government ordered the whole country to celebrate the victory, with the next day (September 3) as Victory Day. The whole country celebrated and had a day off. All sectors of society in the country would fly flags to celebrate on September 3, 4 and 5. In April 1946, the Nationalist government officially decided to designate September 3 of each year as the "Victory Day of the Anti-Japanese War".

On 1 October 1949, the People's Republic of China was officially established. On December 23 of the same year, the Government Administration Council promulgated the Regulations on National Holidays and Memorial Days, which also included the "Victory Day of the Anti-Japanese War", but the date was set on August 15 of each year. There was controversy about this, as some believe that August 15 was the day when the Japanese emperor Hirohito announced his surrender, while the Japanese government only officially surrendered after signing the surrender document on September 2, arguing that September 3 is more appropriate as a memorial day from a procedural and legal perspective.

On 1 August 1951, Chairman of the Chinese Communist Party Mao Zedong wrote in reaction to Hu Qiaomu's report on the Victory Day of the Anti-Japanese War that September 3 should be the unified national Victory Day for the Victory over Japan. On August 13 of the same year, the Government Administration Council issued a notice signed by Premier Zhou Enlai, changing the commemoration day to September 3 of each year, the date being consistent with the "Victory Day of the Anti-Japanese War" established by the Nationalist government. The order read:

In the unified national holiday regulations for holidays and commemorative days promulgated by this Court on December 23, 1949, August 15 was designated as Victory Day in the War of Resistance Against Japanese Aggression. However, Japan's surrender occurred after the Japanese government signed the surrender treaty on September 2, 1945. Therefore, Victory Day in the War of Resistance Against Japanese Aggression should be redesignated September 3. Every September 3, the people of the country should commemorate the glorious victory over Japan achieved by our military and civilians during the great eight-year War of Resistance Against Japanese Aggression, and with the assistance of the Soviet army in liberating Northeast China. September 3 will not be a holiday.

On 3 September 1995, the Chinese government held the Conference to Commemorate the 50th Anniversary of the Victory of the Chinese People's War of Resistance Against Japanese Aggression and the World Anti-Fascist War for the first time in the name of the country. CCP General Secretary Jiang Zemin attended the conference and delivered a speech.

...The World Anti-Fascist War was the greatest just war in human history, and the historical enlightenment it left for all of humanity is invaluable. For the sake of world peace, development, and progress, all countries, regardless of size, strength, poverty, wealth, or social system, should respect each other, seek common ground while reserving differences, live in harmony, and develop together. This is the best way for us to review history and comfort the spirits of the heroes today....

On 18 September 1999, the State Council of China revised the Regulations on National Holidays and Memorial Days, which continued the tradition of September 3 as the Victory Day of the Anti-Japanese War. On 27 February 2014, the seventh session of the Standing Committee of the 12th National People's Congress passed a decision to designate September 3 as the Victory Day of the Chinese People's War of Resistance Against Japanese Aggression, which was the first time that the day was legislated to be a legal holiday. One year later, on September 3, the first commemorative military parade was held in Tiananmen Square, Beijing.

== Date selection ==
For decades, there has been a social controversy over whether the Victory Day of the Anti-Japanese War should be held on August 15 or September 3. An article published on the Institute of Contemporary China Studies stated that the reason why the Victory Day of the Anti-Japanese War was chosen on September 3 instead of August 15 was mainly due to the following two reasons:

1. Japan only announced an armistice on August 15, but did not declare surrender or sign a surrender document. The Imperial Rescript on the Termination of the War does not contain the word "surrender" at all, and does not mention the war of aggression against China at all.
2. The international practice at that time was to use the day after the defeated country signed the surrender instrument as the Victory Day. For example, Germany surrendered to the Allies and signed the surrender instrument on 7 May 1945, so May 8 became the Victory in Europe Day; and Berlin formally signed the surrender instrument of unconditional surrender to the Soviet Union, the United States and other countries on 8 May 1945, so Russia and the Commonwealth of Independent States countries regard May 9 as the Victory Day of the Great Patriotic War.

== Commemorative activities ==
=== Celebration meetings ===
The earliest tradition of the Chinese Communist Party (CCP) celebrating the victory of the Anti-Japanese War can be traced back to the celebration held in Yan'an on August 15, 1945. That night, grand torch parades were held in all districts of Yan'an, with brilliant lights and loud gongs and drums. The poet Ai Qing once described the scene in his article The People's Carnival: "Crowds, crowds everywhere. Gratitude spreads gratitude, joy spreads joy; everyone holds their chests high, holds torches high, follows the gongs and drums, and rushes to the streets – all doors are open to welcome joy, entertain joy, joy is the most noble guest tonight".

At 8:30 a.m. on September 3, 1945, Chinese leader Chiang Kai-shek led important party, government and military officials of the Nationalist government to hold a celebration and commemorative meeting in the National Government Auditorium. At the same time, the Chongqing Electric Power Company sounded a long tone to lift the air defense alarm, calling it the "voice of peace", and ordered the whole country to celebrate for three days to commemorate the victory of the War of Resistance Against Japan. On the previous day (September 2), the Shaanxi-Gansu-Ningxia Border Region government had decided to have a three-day holiday on September 3, 4 and 5, and then decided to hold a mass meeting to celebrate the victory of the War of Resistance Against Japan on September 5.

For a long period of time after the State Council changed and determined the date of the Anti-Japanese War Memorial Day in 1951, the Anti-Japanese War Memorial Day did not attract enough attention. Instead, it was celebrated at will, depending on the political environment of each period. From the 1950s to the early 1960s, the main propaganda points of the CCP on the Anti-Japanese War were: "1. The Anti-Japanese War ended with the defeat of Japanese imperialism. This was a great transformation of the Chinese people's anti-imperialist struggle from failure to victory in the past century. 2. The defeat of Japan was mainly the credit of the Chinese people and the Soviet Union. 3. American imperialism is the mortal enemy of the Chinese people today." This coincided with the honeymoon period between China and the Soviet Union. The top leaders of the two parties and countries often sent each other congratulatory telegrams on September 3. For example, on September 3, 1952, the People's Daily published an article on Mao Zedong's congratulatory telegram to the Soviet Union : "Chairman Mao sends a telegram to Marshal Stalin to congratulate the seventh anniversary of the victory of the Anti-Japanese War."

After the mid-1960s, celebrations related to the War of Resistance Against Japanese Aggression gradually began to de-Sovietize. For example, in 1965, the commemorative article "Long Live the Victory of the People's War in Commemoration of the 20th Anniversary of the Victory of the Chinese People's War of Resistance Against Japanese Aggression" written by Lin Biao, Vice Chairman of the CCP, still retained the key points of the class struggle historical view such as "opposing American imperialism" and "long live the people's war", but did not mention the Soviet Union's military deployment and assistance. Instead, it added new content such as "criticizing Khrushchev's revisionism " and "supporting the Vietnamese people". After 1966, with the outbreak of the Cultural Revolution, the importance of the War of Resistance Against Japanese Aggression Day further declined, and was even "completely forgotten" for a time. This situation did not improve until the People's Daily published an editorial on September 3, 1975, "Commemorating the 30th Anniversary of the Victory of the War of Resistance Against Japanese Aggression".

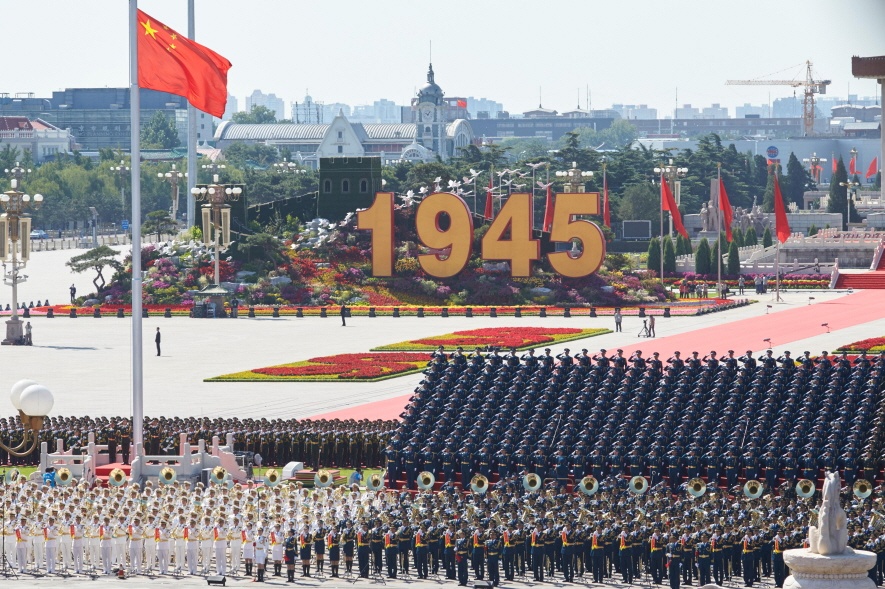
70th anniversary Victory Day Parade on Tiananmen Square

Since the beginning of the reform and opening-up era, the importance of commemorating the Victory Day of the Anti-Japanese War has been increasing. At the same time, as the rectification of chaos and the restoration of order were carried out, the contributions of anti-Japanese forces outside the CCP were gradually recognized, and the propaganda focus began to focus on "the whole nation's war of resistance". In 1985, on the occasion of the 40th anniversary of the victory of the Anti-Japanese War, Xinhua News Agency and People's Daily published articles "The Great National War of Resistance" and "China's War of Resistance Against Japanese Aggression is a War of Resistance Against Aggression by the Whole Nation", which for the first time recognized the contribution of the Kuomintang in the War of Resistance Against Japanese Aggression.

In 1995, on the occasion of the 50th anniversary of the victory over Japan, the Chinese Communist Party held the first Conference to Commemorate the Victory of the War of Resistance Against Japanese Aggression and the Victory of the World Anti-Fascist War. CCP General Secretary Jiang Zemin and other party and state leaders came to the Monument to the People's Heroes in Tiananmen Square to lay wreaths. That evening, a large evening party was held with the participation of some veterans of the War of Resistance Against Japanese Aggression. In addition, a set of commemorative coins was issued. The commemorative conference held on the occasion of the 60th anniversary of the victory of the War of Resistance Against Japanese Aggression in 2005 also largely continued this format.

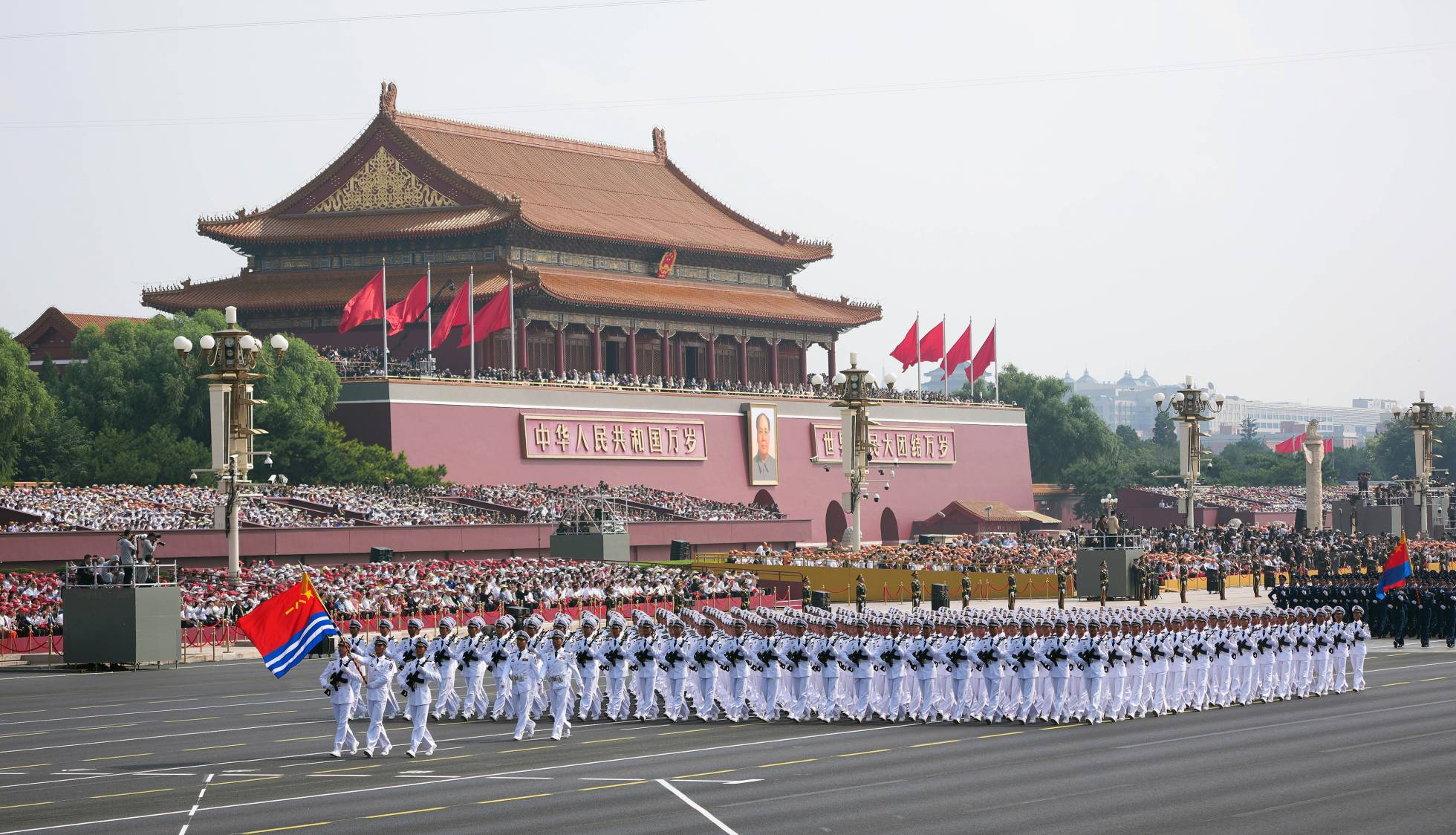
People's Liberation Army Navy soldiers participate in the 80th Victory Day parade in Beijing, 3 September 2025

On 3 September 2015, China held a military parade to mark the 70th anniversary of the victory over Japan, changing the format of the commemorative meeting to a large-scale military and civilian celebration held in Tiananmen Square. Except for the absence of a mass parade, its specifications are comparable to the military parade on National Day of the People's Republic of China. On 24 June 2025, the State Council Information Office held a press conference and confirmed that the military parade would be held on September 3, 2025, which initially laid the foundation for the similar practice of holding the military parade on Victory Day and the National Day military parade every ten years. The second parade was held on 3 September 2025.

=== Holiday ===
Although the commemoration day is a statutory holiday in mainland China, it is not a public holiday. This has not changed since the State Council promulgated the Regulations on Holidays for National Festivals and Memorial Days on 23 December 1949. For this reason, there have been proposals to make the day a national statutory holiday. However, as of 26 October 2025, except for a few special cases (such as the 70th anniversary), most of the time, even if the tenth day of the month is celebrated, it is not necessarily a holiday.

=== Other ===
The Jiusan Society, one of the non-oppositional democratic parties of China, was founded on September 3, 1945. At that time, there was a "Democratic Science Symposium" in Chongqing, which was organized by many democratic figures outside the Kuomintang and the Communist Party. They held an expanded symposium on the day when the Kuomintang announced the national celebration. On the same day, they decided to name the organization after September 3, and the Jiusan Society got its name from this day. Therefore, the anniversary of the victory is also the anniversary of the founding of the Jiusan Society.
