= 2009 Moscow Victory Day Parade =

Russian military parade

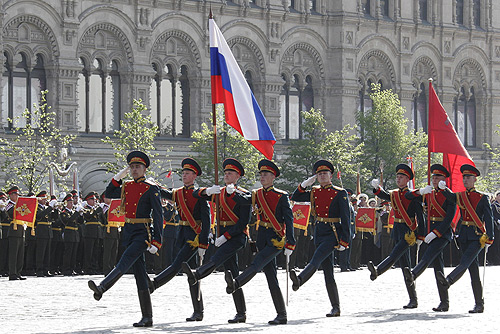
Troops marching during the parade

The 2009 Moscow Victory Parade was held on Victory Day on the 64th anniversary of the Great Patriotic War, which ended in the defeat of Nazi Germany. The parade was commanded by Valery Gerasimov, commander of the Moscow Military District, and reviewed by Anatoliy Serdyukov of the Russian Ministry of Defence. A speech was made by president of Russia, Dmitry Medvedev, in which he warned other countries against embarking on military adventures. This was thought to be a veiled warning directed at Georgian President Mikhail Saakashvili. The Defense Ministry noted that the air parade is a de facto dress rehearsal for the jubilee parade that followed in honor of the 65th anniversary of Victory.

== Forces at the Parade ==
Note: Those indicated in bold indicate first parade appearance, those indicated with italic indicate double or multiple parade appearances.

- Colonel General Valery Gerasimov, Commander of the Moscow Military District (parade commander)
- Defense Minister of the Russian Federation Anatoliy Serdyukov (parade inspector)

=== Military Bands in Attendance ===
- Massed Military Bands led and conducted by Major General Valery Khalilov and composed of:
  - Headquarters Band of the Moscow Military District
  - Central Military Band of the MDRF
  - Headquarters Band, of the Ministry of Internal Affairs of the Russian Federation
  - Central Band of the Russian Navy
  - Band of the Moscow Military Conservatoire, Military University of the Ministry of Defense of the Russian Federation
  - HQ Band of the Ministry of Emergency Situations of the Russian Federation
  - Band of the Combined Arms Academy of the Armed Forces of the Russian Federation
- Corps of Drums of the Moscow Military Conservatoire, Military University of the Ministry of Defense of the Russian Federation

=== Infantry Column ===
- 154th Moscow Garrison Commandant's Honor Guard Regiment and Color Guards
  - Colors Party composed of:
    - Flag of Russia
    - Victory Banner
    - Banner of the Armed Forces of the Russian Federation
  - Combined Honor Guards Company of the Armed Forces
- Representative units of the Armed Forced, Ministry of Internal Affairs, Ministry of Emergency Situations and Civil Defense, Federal Security Service as well as units of the Moscow Military District
  - Combined Arms Academy of the Armed Forces of the Russian Federation
  - Military University of the Ministry of Defense of the Russian Federation
  - Peter the Great Military Academy of the Strategic Missile Forces
  - Gagarin Air Force Academy
  - Zhukovsky Air Force Engineering Academy
  - Air Force Gen. Staff School of Rocket Forces and Anti-Air Defense Training
  - Baltic Naval Military Institute "Admiral Fyodor Ushakov"
  - 336th Separate Bialystok Guards Naval Infantry Brigade of the Baltic Fleet
  - Moscow Military Space Institute of Radio Electronics
  - Ryazan Airborne Command Academy "Gen. of the Army Vasily Margelov"
  - Guards Airborne Regiment
  - Civil Defense Academy of the Ministry of Emergency Situations of the Russian Federation
  - Military Technological University
  - 5th Tamanskaya Guards Ind. Motor Rifle Brigade "Mikhail Kalinin"
  - 4th Kantemir Guards Armored Brigade "Yuri Andropov"
  - 27th Sevastopol Guards Motor Rifle Brigade
  - ODON Ind. Motorized Internal Troops Division of the Ministry of Internal Affairs of the Russian Federation "Felix Dzerzhinsky"
  - Moscow Border Guards Institute of the Border Guard Service of the Federal Security Service of the Russian Federation "Moscow City Council"
  - Moscow Military Commanders Training School "Supreme Soviet of the RSFSR/Russian Federation"

With more than 9,000 soldier, sailors, and airmen and 100 vehicles marching in the parade, this was the largest such parade held in Russia since the fall of the Soviet Union.

Unlike previous Victory Day parades, there were no units parading in Great Patriotic War uniforms, though the Victory Banner was paraded at the beginning of the ceremony.

=== Ground vehicles at the Parade ===
This was only the second time since the fall of the Soviet Union when armoured fighting vehicles took part in the Red Square parade.

Vehicles in the parade included:

- UAZ-469
- GAZ-2975
- BTR-80
- BMP-3
- BMD-4
- Sprut anti-tank gun
- T-90A
- 2S19 Msta
- 9K22 Tunguska
- Tor Missile System
- Buk-M1-2
- BM-30 Smerch
- S-300
- Iskander M
- RT-2PM Topol

=== Aircraft at the Parade ===
- Kamov Ka-52
- Mil Mi-24
- Mil Mi-8
- Mil Mi-26
- Antonov An-124
- Beriev A-50
- Sukhoi Su-27
- Tupolev Tu-160
- Mikoyan MiG-31
- Tupolev Tu-95
- Ilyushin Il-78
- Mikoyan MiG-29
- Sukhoi Su-24
- Sukhoi Su-34
- Tupolev Tu-22M
- Sukhoi Su-25
- Sukhoi Su-27 and 4 Mikoyan MiG-29 of the Russian Knights and Strizhi

== Music ==
Flag procession, Inspection, and Address

- March of the Preobrazhensky Regiment (Марш Преображенского Полка) by Unknown
- Slow March of the Tankmen (Встречный Марш Танкистов) by Semyon Tchernetsky
- Slow March to Carry the War Flag (Встречный Марш для выноса Боевого Знамени) by Dmitriy Valentinovich Kadeyev
- Slow March of the Guards of the Navy (Гвардейский Встречный Марш Военно-Морского Флота) by Nikolai Pavlocich Ivanov-Radkevich
- Slow March of the Officers Schools (Встречный Марш офицерских училищ) by Semyon Tchernetsky
- Slow March (Встречный Марш) by Dmitry Pertsev
- Slow March of the Red Army (Встречный Марш Красной Армии) by Semyon Tchernetsky
- Slow March (Встречный Марш) by Evgeny Aksyonov
- Glory (Славься) by Mikhail Glinka
- Parade Fanfare All Listen! (Парадная Фанфара "Слушайте все!") by Andrei Golovin
- State Anthem of the Russian Federation (Государственный Гимн Российской Федерации) by Alexander Alexandrov
- Signal Retreat (Сигнал "Отбой")

Infantry Column

- Farewell of Slavianka (Прощание Славянки) by Vasiliy Agapkin
- In Defense of the Homeland (В защиту Родины) by Viktor Sergeyevich Runov
- Air March (Авиамарш) by Yuliy Abramovich Khait
- Crew is One Family (Экипаж - одна семья) by Viktor Vasilyevich Pleshak
- We Need One Victory (Нам Нужна Одна Победа) by Bulat Shalvovich Okudzhava
- March Kant (Марш "Кант") by Valery Khalilov
- On Guard for the Peace (На страже Мира) by Boris Alexandrovich Diev
- To Serve Russia (Служить России) by Eduard Cemyonovich Khanok
- Victory Day (День Победы) by David Fyodorovich Tukhmanov

Vehicle Column

- General Miloradovich ("Генерал Милорадович") by Valery Khalilov
- Triumph of the Winners (Триумф Победителей)
- Katyusha (Катюша) by Matvey Blanter
- Artillery March (Марш Артиллеристов) by Tikhon Khrennikov
- March Hero (Марш "Герой")

Flypast Column

- Air March (Авиамарш) by Yuliy Abramovich Khait
- March Airplanes – First of all (Марш "Первым делом самолёты") by Vasili-Solovyov-Sedoi
- Air March (Авиамарш) by Yuliy Abramovich Khait
- March Airplanes – First of all (Марш "Первым делом самолёты") by Vasili-Solovyov-Sedoi

Conclusion

- Long Live our State (Да здравствует наша держава) by Boris Alexandrov
- Song of the Russian Army (Песня о Российской Армии) by Alexander Alexandrov

== See also ==
- 2008 Moscow Victory Day Parade
- 2010 Moscow Victory Day Parade
- 60th Anniversary of the People's Republic of China
- Millennial Anniversary of Hanoi
