= Walking Into the New Era =

Song by Yin Qing
- Released: September 19, 1997

"Walking Into the New Era" (Chinese: 走进新时代) is a song about the leadership of Jiang Zemin. It was created on the eve of the 15th National Congress of the Chinese Communist Party in 1997. The lyrics were written by Jiang Kairu, the music was composed by Yin Qing, and Zhang Ye first sang it at the "Carrying Forward the Past and Opening the Future" gala celebrating the opening of the 15th National Congress on September 19, 1997. It uses the style of folk songs. It aims to praise the third generation of leadership of the Chinese Communist Party (CCP) with Jiang Zemin as the core and the cause of socialist modernization with Chinese characteristics.

== Composition ==
In late 1996, Shenzhen Luohu District invited Jiang Kairu to write a song cycle of 10 songs for the return of Hong Kong. The first 9 songs were completed quickly. Jiang Kairu wanted to use the tenth song to praise the CCP, and set a standard for himself: "It can be sung not only within the party, but also outside the party; it can be sung in China and abroad." However, after two months, he still had no inspiration.

After Deng Xiaoping died in 1997, Jiang Kairu, who had composed " Spring Story ", expressed his concerns when talking to a friend about the question "How long can "Spring Story" be sung now that Xiaoping is gone?" On May 29 of the same year, Jiang Zemin, then general secretary of the Chinese Communist Party, delivered the May 29 speech, clearly stating that "we must hold high the great banner of Deng Xiaoping's theory of building socialism with Chinese characteristics". On May 30, the content of the speech was released. That night, Jiang Kairu wrote three lines in his diary that mentioned " The East is Red " and "Spring Story", which became the prototype of "Into the New Era". However, the title of the first draft was "China is Lucky", and because the theme was still the return of Hong Kong, the first line was "Sweep away the dust of history and end the national sorrow".

In August 1997, Luohu District decided to use "China is Lucky" as a tribute to the 15th National Congress of the CCP. During the review, the leaders of China Central Television (CCTV) requested that the lyrics be changed to festive words. After Jiang Kairu revised the lyrics, CCTV invited Yin Qing, who was then working in the Nanjing Military Region Frontline Song and Dance Troupe, to compose the new lyrics. The song was also renamed "Entering the New Era". Yin Qing completed the first draft on the night he received the lyrics, but thought that the grand and high-pitched melody could not adapt to the new relationship between the CCP and the masses, so he wrote the second draft overnight, which was like "confiding to relatives". After writing it, Yin Qing thought that the second draft was "too lyrical and not grand enough". After singing it in the office, Yin Qing received feedback that "both drafts are good". Later, he heard the office director humming the second draft, so he decided to use the second draft as the final score.

== Performance occasions ==
As a typical red song at the turn of the century, it has been sung on many occasions, including the founding ceremony of the CCP and the National Day of the People's Republic of China.

- 1998 China Central Television Spring Festival Gala
- 1999 China Central Television Spring Festival Gala
- 2008 Singing in the New Era - Gala to Celebrate the 30th Anniversary of Reform and Opening-up
- 2009 Capital's Celebration of the 60th anniversary of the People's Republic of China
- 2019 Celebration of the 70th anniversary of the People's Republic of China

== Adaptation ==
- The Mantovani Orchestra, founded by Anunzio Paolo Mantovani, adapted Walking Into the New Era into a light music performance, which became their first piece of music adapted from Chinese music.
