= On the Great Road =

Chinese patriotic song

"On the Great Road" (simplified Chinese: 我们走在大路上; traditional Chinese: 我們走在大路上; pinyin: Wǒmen zǒu zài dàlù shàng), commonly known as We Walk on the Great Road, is a Chinese patriotic song written and composed by Li Jiefu in 1962 and published the following year. The song alludes to the metaphorical road to development for the Chinese people and state after the Great Leap Forward, as well as to the Long March undertaken by Mao Zedong and the Chinese Communist Party in 1934. We Walk on the Great Road was a popular patriotic songs during the Cultural Revolution, and its optimistic tone and simple lyrics cemented it as one of the most popular and enduring patriotic songs of the era, being ranked by the Chinese National Culture Promotion Association as one of the 124 greatest Chinese musical works. Notably, the song was sung extensively during the transfer of sovereignty over Hong Kong, and featured prominently in the 50th Anniversary of the People's Republic Parade in 1999.

== History ==
At the onset of the Second Sino-Japanese War in 1937, Li Jiefu (born Li Yunlong) began songwriting for the Yan'an People's Drama Society of the Red Army of Workers and Peasants in China, a propagandist organisation in association with the Chinese Communist Party. Previously a pickpocket, Li was transferred to the Eighth Route Army in Northwestern China to aid in the propaganda effort. By 1939, Li had already produced a number of popular anti-Japanese songs, such as 'Our Iron Cavalry', 'Two Little Cows Singing', and 'The Five Champions of Langya Mountain'. By 1945, Li had become the President of the Yan'an People's Drama Society, and became responsible for much of the propaganda dissemination over Northwestern China.

In 1958, Mao Zedong implemented the Great Leap Forward, a series of economic and social policies attempting to modernise infrastructure and increase industrial output across China. This caused nationwide famine, and generally began to erode popular support for the communist system. In response, the CPC began aggressively increasing propaganda output in the early 1960s. It was under these conditions that Li created the song 'We Walk on the Great Road'. Allegedly, Li received inspiration for the lyrics after a chance meeting with a former friend and soldier during a visit to Beijing, who impressed Li with his iron resolve and optimistic disposition. The song was reportedly a personal favourite of Zhou Enlai. The lyrics were altered to be more nationalistic in tone during the Cultural Revolution.

After the discrediting of the Gang of Four, the song was temporarily banned, however was eventually re-permitted following lyrical alterations, largely reverting to the original lyrics and removing references to Anti-Americanism, the Cultural Revolution, and Mao Zedong.

== Original lyrics ==
Simplified Chinese	Pinyin	English translation
我们走在大路上, 意气风发斗志昂扬, 毛主席领导革命队伍, 披荆斩棘奔向前方. 向前进！ 向前进！ 革命气势不可阻挡, 向前进！ 向前进！ 朝着胜利的方向. 三面红旗迎风飘扬, 六亿人民奋发图强, 勤恳建设锦绣河山, 誓把祖国变成天堂. 向前进！ 向前进！ 革命气势不可阻挡, 向前进！ 向前进！ 朝着胜利的方向. 我们的朋友遍天下, 我们的歌声传四方, 革命风暴席卷全球, 牛鬼蛇神一片惊慌. 向前进！ 向前进！ 革命气势不可阻挡, 向前进！ 向前进！ 朝着胜利的方向. 我们的道路多么宽广, 我们的前程无比辉煌, 我们献身这壮丽的事业, 无限幸福无上荣光. 向前进！ 向前进！ 革命气势不可阻挡, 向前进！ 向前进！ 朝着胜利的方向.	wǒ men zǒu zài dà lù shàng, yì qì fēng fā dòu zhì áng yáng, Máo zhǔ xí lǐng dǎo gé mìng duì wǔ, pī jīng zhǎn jí bēn xiàng qián fāng . xiàng qián jìn ！xiàng qián jìn ！ gé mìng qì shì bù kě zǔ dǎng, xiàng qián jìn ！xiàng qián jìn ！ cháo zhe shèng lì de fāng xiàng . sān miàn hóng qí yíng fēng piāo yáng, liù yì rén mín fèn fā tú qiáng, qín kěn jiàn shè jǐn xiù hé shān, shì bǎ zǔ guó biàn chéng tiān táng . xiàng qián jìn ！xiàng qián jìn ！ gé mìng qì shì bù kě zǔ dǎng, xiàng qián jìn ！xiàng qián jìn ！ cháo zhe shèng lì de fāng xiàng . wǒ mén de péng yǒu biàn tiān xià, wǒ mén de gē shēng chuán sì fāng, gé mìng fēng bào xí juǎn quán qiú, niú guǐ shé shén yī piàn jīng huāng . xiàng qián jìn ！xiàng qián jìn ！ gé mìng qì shì bù kě zǔ dǎng, xiàng qián jìn ！xiàng qián jìn ！ cháo zhe shèng lì de fāng xiàng . wǒ mén de dào lù duō me kuān guǎng, wǒ mén de qián chéng wú bǐ huī huáng, wǒ mén xiàn shēn zhè zhuàng lì de shì yè, wú xiàn xìng fú wú shàng róng guāng . xiàng qián jìn ！xiàng qián jìn ！ gé mìng qì shì bù kě zǔ dǎng, xiàng qián jìn ！xiàng qián jìn ！ cháo zhe shèng lì de fāng xiàng .	We walk on the great road, With high spirits and high morale, Chairman Mao leads the revolutionary masses. Rushing forward and throwing thorns aside. Go ahead! Go ahead! The momentum of the revolution is unstoppable, Go ahead! Go ahead! In the direction of victory. The three red flags flutter in the wind. Six hundred million people are spirited in labor, Diligently building up the splendid mountains and rivers, Vowing to turn the motherland into a paradise. Go ahead! Go ahead! The momentum of the revolution is unstoppable, Go ahead! Go ahead! In the direction of victory. Our friends are all over the world, Our songs are heard in all directions. The revolutionary storm swept across the world, Leaving ghosts and demons in morbid panic. Go ahead! Go ahead! The momentum of the revolution is unstoppable, Go ahead! Go ahead! In the direction of victory. Our road is endlessly broad, Our future is infinitely brilliant. We are dedicated to this magnificent undertaking, With infinite happiness and exalted glory. Go ahead! Go ahead! The momentum of the revolution is unstoppable, Go ahead! Go ahead! In the direction of victory.

== Lyrics during the Cultural Revolution ==
Simplified Chinese	Pinyin	English translation
我们走在大路上, 高举红旗向太阳, 毛主席领导革命队伍, 披荆斩棘奔向前方。 向前进！ 向前进！ 革命洪流不可阻挡， 向前进！ 向前进！ 朝着胜利的方向。 万里河山红烂漫， 文化革命胜利辉煌， 工人阶级领导一切， 七亿人民斗志昂扬。 向前进！ 向前进！ 革命洪流不可阻挡， 向前进！ 向前进！ 朝着胜利的方向。 我们的朋友遍天下, 我们的歌声传四方, 革命风暴席卷全球, 美帝苏修一定灭亡。 向前进！ 向前进！ 革命洪流不可阻挡， 向前进！ 向前进！ 朝着胜利的方向。 大海航行靠舵手， 干革命靠毛泽东思想， 永远忠于毛主席， 红心似火意志如钢。 向前进！ 向前进！ 革命洪流不可阻挡， 向前进！ 向前进！ 朝着胜利的方向。	wǒ men zǒu zài dà lù shàng, gāo jǔ hóng qí xiàng tài yáng, máo zhǔ xí lǐng dǎo gé mìng duì wǔ , pī jīng zhǎn jí bēn xiàng qián fāng 。 xiàng qián jìn ！ xiàng qián jìn ！ gé mìng hóng liú bù kě zǔ dǎng ， xiàng qián jìn ！ xiàng qián jìn ！ cháo zhe shèng lì de fāng xiàng 。 wàn lǐ hé shān hóng làn màn ， wén huà gé mìng shèng lì huī huáng ， gōng rén jiē jí lǐng dǎo yī qiē ， qī yì rén mín dòu zhì áng yáng 。 xiàng qián jìn ！ xiàng qián jìn ！ gé mìng hóng liú bù kě zǔ dǎng ， xiàng qián jìn ！ xiàng qián jìn ！ cháo zhe shèng lì de fāng xiàng 。 wǒ mén dí péng yǒu biàn tiān xià, wǒ mén dí gē shēng chuán sì fāng, gé mìng fēng bào xí juàn quán qiú, měi dì sū xiū yī dìng miè wáng 。 xiàng qián jìn ！ xiàng qián jìn ！ gé mìng hóng liú bù kě zǔ dǎng ， xiàng qián jìn ！ xiàng qián jìn ！ cháo zhe shèng lì de fāng xiàng 。 dà hǎi háng xíng kào duò shǒu ， gàn gé mìng kào Máo Zé dōng sī xiǎng ， yǒng yuǎn zhōng yú Máo zhǔ xí ， hóng xīn sì huǒ yì zhì rú gāng 。 xiàng qián jìn ！ xiàng qián jìn ！ gé mìng hóng liú bù kě zǔ dǎng ， xiàng qián jìn ！ xiàng qián jìn ！ cháo zhe shèng lì de fāng xiàng。	We walk on the great road, Holding a red flag to the sun, Chairman Mao leads the revolutionary masses, Rushing forward and throwing thorns aside. Go ahead! Go ahead! The torrent of revolution is irresistible Go ahead! Go ahead! In the direction of victory. Ten thousand miles of mountains and rivers shines crimson The cultural revolution is victorious and brilliant. The working class leads everything. Seven hundred million people are highly motivated in their struggles. Go ahead! Go ahead! The torrent of revolution is irresistible Go ahead! Go ahead! In the direction of victory. Our friends are all over the world, Our songs are heard in all directions. The revolutionary storm swept across the world, American imperialists and Soviet revisionists will certainly perish. Go ahead! Go ahead! The torrent of revolution is irresistible Go ahead! Go ahead! In the direction of victory. Sailing the seas depends on the helmsman, The revolution depends on Mao Zedong Thought. Be always loyal to Chairman Mao, Red hearts like fire will be like steel. Go ahead! Go ahead! The torrent of revolution is irresistible Go ahead! Go ahead! In the direction of victory.

== Contemporary lyrics ==
Simplified Chinese	Pinyin	English translation
我们走在大路上, 意气风发斗志昂扬, 共产党领导革命队伍, 披荆斩棘奔向前方. 向前进!向前进! 革命气势不可阻挡, 向前进!向前进! 朝着胜利的方向. 革命红旗迎风飘扬, 中华儿女发奋图强, 勤恳建设锦绣河山, 誓把祖国变成天堂. 向前进!向前进! 革命气势不可阻挡, 向前进!向前进! 朝着胜利的方向. 我们的道路洒满阳光, 我们的歌声传四方， 我们的朋友遍及全球, 五洲架起友谊桥梁。 向前进!向前进! 革命气势不可阻挡, 向前进!向前进! 朝着胜利的方向. 我们的道路多么宽广, 我们的前程无比辉煌, 我们献身这壮丽的事业, 无限幸福无限荣光. 向前进!向前进! 革命气势不可阻挡, 向前进!向前进! 朝着胜利的方向.	wǒ men zǒu zài dà lù shàng, yì qì fēng fā dǒu zhì áng yáng, gòng chǎn dǎng lǐng dǎo gé mìng duì wǔ, pī jīng zhǎn jí bēn xiàng qián fāng . xiàng qián jìn ! xiàng qián jìn ! gé mìng qì shì bù kě zǔ dǎng, xiàng qián jìn ! xiàng qián jìn ! cháo zhe shèng lì de fāng xiàng . gé mìng hóng qí yíng fēng piāo yáng, zhōng huá ér nǚ fā fèn tú qiáng, qín kěn jiàn shè jǐn xiù hé shān, shì bǎ zǔ guó biàn chéng tiān táng . xiàng qián jìn ! xiàng qián jìn ! gé mìng qì shì bù kě zǔ dǎng, xiàng qián jìn ! xiàng qián jìn ! cháo zhe shèng lì de fāng xiàng . wǒ mén dí dào lù sǎ mǎn yáng guāng, wǒ mén dí gē shēng chuán sì fāng ， wǒ mén dí péng yǒu biàn jí quán qiú, wǔ zhōu jià qǐ yǒu yì qiáo liáng 。 xiàng qián jìn ! xiàng qián jìn ! gé mìng qì shì bù kě zǔ dǎng, xiàng qián jìn ! xiàng qián jìn ! cháo zhe shèng lì de fāng xiàng . wǒ mén dí dào lù duō me kuān guǎng wǒ mén dí qián chéng wú bǐ huī huáng, wǒ mén xiàn shēn zhè zhuàng lì dí shì yè , wú xiàn xìng fú wú xiàn róng guāng . xiàng qián jìn ! xiàng qián jìn ! gé mìng qì shì bù kě zǔ dǎng, xiàng qián jìn ! xiàng qián jìn ! cháo zhe shèng lì de fāng xiàng .	We walk on the great road, With high spirits and high morale, The Communist party leads the revolutionary masses. Rushing forward and throwing thorns aside. Go ahead! Go ahead! The momentum of the revolution is unstoppable, Go ahead! Go ahead! In the direction of victory. The revolutionary red flag fluttered in the wind. The Chinese people are struggling Diligently building up the splendid mountains and rivers, Vowing to turn the motherland into a paradise. Go ahead! Go ahead! The momentum of the revolution is unstoppable, Go ahead! Go ahead! In the direction of victory. Our road is full of sunshine. Our songs are heard in all directions. Our friends are all over the world, Five continents building bridges of friendship. Go forward! Go ahead! The momentum of the revolution is unstoppable, Go forward! Go ahead! In the direction of victory. Our road is endlessly broad, Our future is infinitely brilliant. We are dedicated to this magnificent undertaking, With infinite happiness and exalted glory. Go forward! Go ahead! The momentum of the revolution is unstoppable, Go forward! Go ahead! In the direction of victory.

== See also ==
- Dong Fang Hong I
- The East Is Red (1965 film)
- Honglaowai
- Maoism
- "Ode to the Motherland"
- "Sailing the Seas Depends on the Helmsman"
- "Without the Communist Party, There Would Be No New China"
- "The East Is Red again"
- The Long March
- The Great Leap Forward
