= 60th anniversary of the People's Republic of China =

2009 grand military parade, mass pageant, and music and dance evening gala celebration

Celebrations of the 60th anniversary of the founding of the People's Republic of China 庆祝中华人民共和国成立60周年活动
- Logo for the 60th anniversary of the PRC
- Genre: Military parade, mass pageant, music and dance gala
- Date: 1 October 2009
- Frequency: Select years (Note: Since the founding of the people's republic until 2009, the country has held 14 National Day grand military parades in 1949–1959, 1984, 1999, and 2009.)
- Locations: Chang'an Avenue, Tiananmen Square, Beijing, China
- Coordinates: 39°54′26.4″N 116°23′27.9″E
- Years active: 77
- Inaugurated: 1 October 1949
- Previous event: 50th anniversary of the People's Republic of China
- Next event: 70th anniversary of the People's Republic of China
- Participants: Hu–Wen Administration, PLA, PAP, the Militia, and other formations
- Leader: Hu Jintao (paramount leader)
- People: Fang Fenghui (chief commander of the military parade)
- Website: Xinhua; People's Daily; China Daily

Celebrations of the 60th anniversary of the founding of the People's Republic of China
- Simplified Chinese: 庆祝中华人民共和国成立60周年活动
- Traditional Chinese: 慶祝中華人民共和國成立60周年活動
- Literal meaning: celebrating Chinese people's republic's founding sixty anniversary live action
Transcriptions
Standard Mandarin
- Hanyu Pinyin: qìngzhù Zhōnghuá Rénmín Gònghéguó chénglì liùshí zhōunián huódòng
Yue: Cantonese
- Yale Romanization: hingjūk Jūngwàh Yàhnmàhn Guhngwòhgwok luhksahp jāunìhn wuhtduhng
- Jyutping: hing^{3}zuk^{1} Zung^{1}waa^{4} Jan^{4}man^{4} Gung^{6}wo^{4}gwok^{3} sing^{4}lap^{6} luk^{6}sap^{6} zau^{1}nin^{4} wut^{6}dung^{6}

Grand gathering
- Simplified Chinese: 庆祝中华人民共和国成立60周年大会
- Traditional Chinese: 慶祝中華人民共和國成立60周年大會
- Literal meaning: celebrating Chinese people's republic's founding seventy anniversary mass gathering
Transcriptions
Standard Mandarin
- Hanyu Pinyin: qìngzhù Zhōnghuá Rénmín Gònghéguó chénglì liùshí zhōunián dàhuì
Yue: Cantonese
- Yale Romanization: hingjūk Jūngwàh Yàhnmàhn Guhngwòhgwok luhksahp jāunìhn daaihwúih
- Jyutping: hing^{3}zuk^{1} Zung^{1}waa^{4} Jan^{4}man^{4} Gung^{6}wo^{4}gwok^{3} luk^{6}lap^{6} zau^{1}nin^{4} daai^{6}wui^{5}

The 60th anniversary of the founding of the People's Republic of China took place on 1 October 2009. A military parade involving 10,000 troops and the display of many high-tech weapons was held in Tiananmen Square in Beijing and various celebrations were conducted all over the country. China's paramount leader Hu Jintao inspected the troops along Chang'an Avenue in Beijing. This parade was immediately followed by a civilian parade involving 100,000 participants.

== Background ==
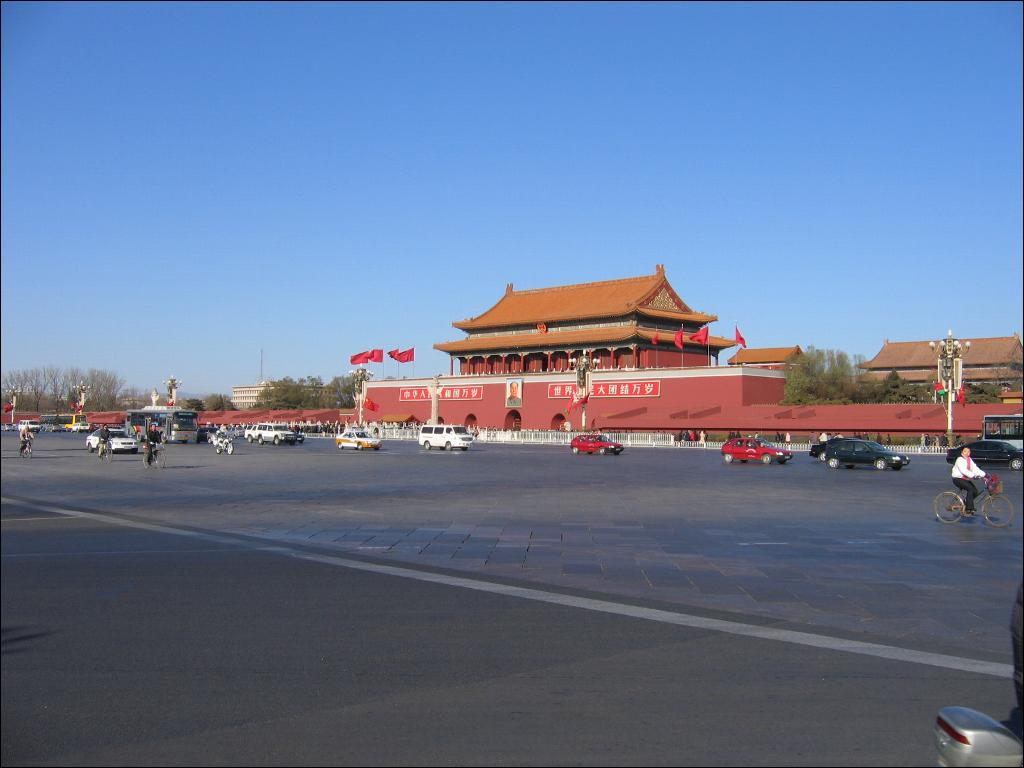
The 60th Anniversary Military Parade took place on Chang'an Avenue, beneath Tiananmen.

The People's Republic of China was founded on 1 October 1949. Since then, celebrations of varying scales occur on National Day each year. Military parades, presided over by Chairman of the Chinese Communist Party Mao Zedong, were held every year between 1949 and 1959. In September 1960, the Chinese leadership decided that in order to save funds and "be frugal", large-scale ceremonies for National Day would only be held every ten years, with a smaller-scale ceremony every five years. The last large-scale celebration during the Mao era was in 1969. Large-scale celebrations did not take place for 14 years amidst the climax of the Cultural Revolution. Since then, the most prominent National Day celebrations have taken place in 1984 and 1999, at the 35th and 50th anniversaries respectively. During these celebrations, then-paramount leader Deng Xiaoping and Jiang Zemin reviewed military parades of the People's Liberation Army. The 2009 parade was the first and last time Hu Jintao oversaw this task, as he left office of General Secretary of the Chinese Communist Party (paramount leader) in 2012 due to term limits.

== Preparations ==
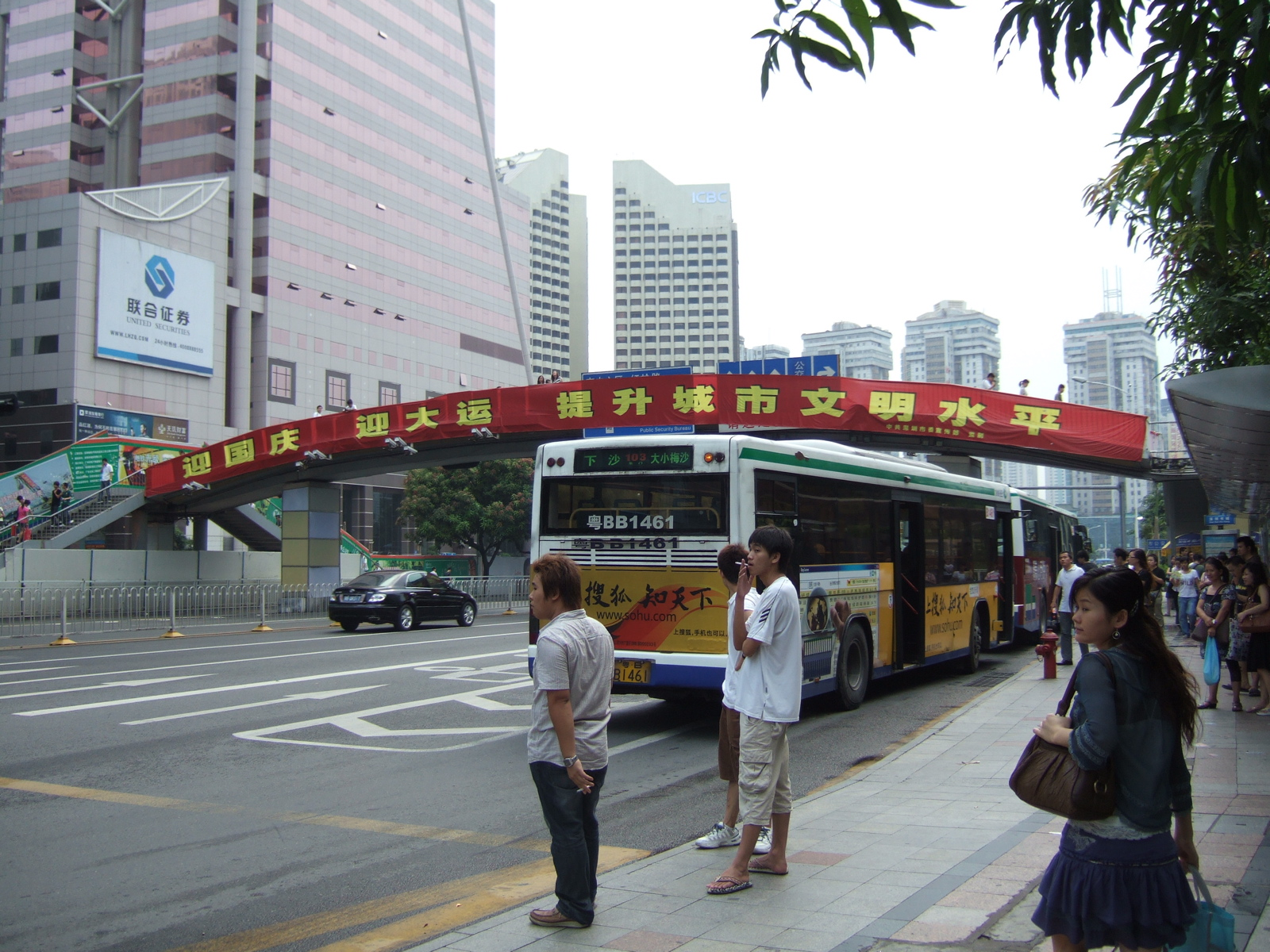
Banner in Shenzhen in late August

40 million potted flowers, supplied by the state-owned Beijing Flowers & Trees Corp., were put in place in Beijing streets, approximately 5 million of which have been planted along the east–west axis of Chang'an Avenue, also known as the 'Avenue of Eternal Peace'. Flowers in Tiananmen Square were under 24-hour surveillance; Beijing Jinggong Red Flag factory began producing 2 million national flags for the celebrations. In Tiananmen Square itself, 56 "pillars of national unity" – each one symbolizing the 56 ethnic groups in China – were erected, with each containing fireworks for the night event on 1 October. 800,000 volunteers controlled crowds and maintained order while a further 30,000 provided translation services at subway and bus stations.

Mosquitoes, rats, flies, and cockroaches were the targets of professional exterminators – four unannounced night-time sweeps were carried out around Tiananmen Square in Beijing, including in the Forbidden City complex. The public was encouraged to support the eradication through red slogan banners along Beijing streets and alleys, in what The Times said was reminiscent of the Four Pests campaign. One of these slogans read: "Eradicate the four pests, stress hygiene. Cleanly, cleanly welcome National Day!"

Tiananmen Square was sealed off for the day on 29 August for the first rehearsals. Tens of thousands of fully costumed performers rehearsed on 16 September. The military also prepared, with several hundred vehicles rolling down Chang'an Avenue on 6 September. Parts of Beijing were closed down on 18 September for the final rehearsals of the anniversary parade. Police cleared streets and office buildings on the main roadways near Tiananmen Square from noon onwards for rehearsals that evening. State media went into overdrive; for example, highlighting how thousands of troops spent four months drilling to march in step on a mock practice ground with scale model of Chang'an Avenue, complete with the leadership reviewing stand. Following disruptions caused by the drills, which shut down roads and large parts of the Beijing Subway, Xinhua News Agency announced that the final rehearsal parade, scheduled for 26 September, was called off.

=== Security ===
The Sunday Times reported that "thousands of agents will stage a security clampdown exceeding anything seen for the 2008 Olympic Games". Police in Beijing and neighbouring provinces were in a heightened state of readiness, with night patrols by armed police lasting from 15 September until the end of the festivities. All basements in the city were subject to inspection by police, while some restaurants with roof terraces were not permitted to seat patrons on sides overlooking the street for the duration. However, despite the supposed high alert around Beijing, a man armed with a knife killed two people and injured 12 in the heart of Beijing on 17 September. Peter Ford of The Christian Science Monitor said that the stabbing incident had been played down locally. Following the attacks, however, knives were removed from sale at some stores such as Walmart and Carrefour.

Thousands of paramilitary officers were deployed at bridges, road tunnels and other strategic points in the city. Residents were warned that if they stepped out onto balconies along the route, they might be shot. 30,000 people with tickets were invited to watch the event, but others were encouraged to watch it on television to "avoid complications."

The Times says the authorities engaged counter-terrorist units and informers in districts where Xinjiang Muslims live, placed Tibetan Buddhists under surveillance, and arrested dissidents. Peasants coming to the capital to present their grievances as petitions were blocked, while the government ordered the search of all cars entering Beijing. The security drives organised by the Ministry of Public Security in Beijing, as well as neighbouring Hebei, Liaoning, Shandong and Shanxi provinces, the Inner Mongolian Autonomous Region and the Tianjin Municipality was dubbed a "Security Moat" by a senior official. The official said the "safety of China's National Day celebrations and stability in Beijing was of overriding importance." The Times reported Internet users claiming censorship had been tightened; many sites had been blocked, among them Facebook and Twitter. One media analyst said that the authorities upgraded their technology to block free proxy services and were trying to block any free proxy services and VPNs during the week prior to the anniversary.

Other security arrangements in place included relocation of mailboxes and newspaper stands along Chang'an Avenue and the closure or restricted opening of some of the hotels along the route (ex. the Beijing Hotel, the Beijing News Plaza Hotel, and the Beijing International Hotel). Other hotels on Chang'an Avenue closed guest rooms facing the main road during the celebrations.

== Media ==
The government established a media centre from 22 September until 2 October at the Media Center Hotel catering for journalists covering celebrations. The centre's deputy, Zhu Shouchen, said they received applications from more than 4,500 journalists around the world, including some 1,300 journalists from 346 media organisations in 108 countries. Almost 400 of them were said to be from Hong Kong, Macau, and Taiwan.

A film entitled The Founding of a Republic, commissioned by China's film regulator and made by the China Film Group (CFG) to mark the anniversary, was released nationwide on 17 September. The film retells the tale of the Communist ascendancy and triumph, with a star-studded cast including actors Zhang Ziyi, Jackie Chan, Jet Li, and directors Jiang Wen, Chen Kaige, and John Woo in mostly cameo appearances; the leading roles – such as Mao Zedong – were played by lesser known actors. CFG chairman Han Sanping co-directed the film with Huang Jianxin. A CFG spokesman said many stars answered Han's call to appear in the film and waived their fee, helping it keep its modest budget of 60–70 million yuan (US$8.8–$10 million). According to the executive at one of China's top multiplex chains, the film unusually married "the core of an 'ethically inspiring' film" – code for propaganda films, according to the Associated Press – "with commercial packaging."

== Parades ==
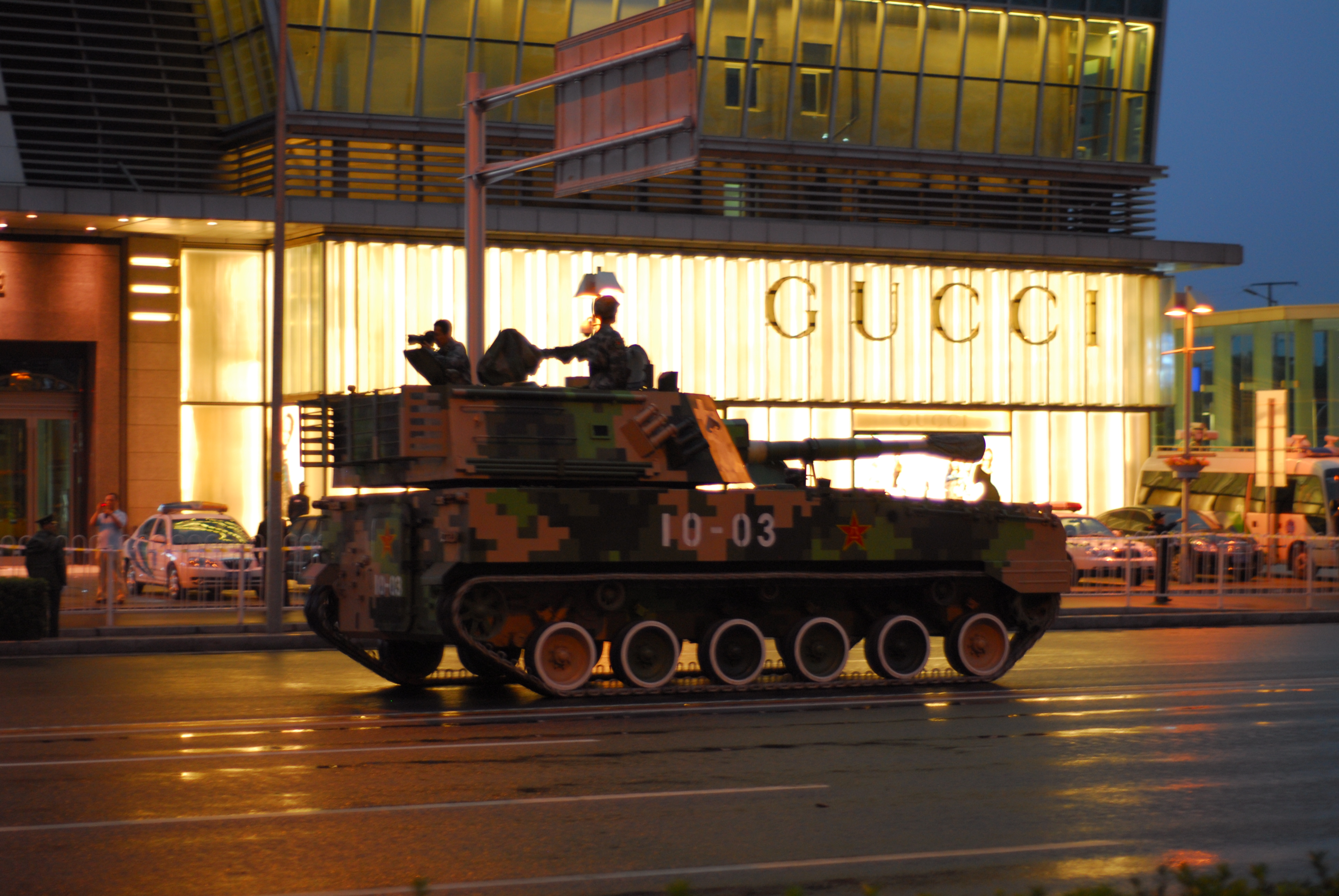
A PLZ-89 self-propelled howitzer passes the Shin Kong Place Luxury shopping centre during a training exercise, Beijing.

=== Leaders ===
Liu Qi, as the Beijing municipal Communist Party Secretary, was the master of ceremonies for the event. Hu Jintao, in his position as the General Secretary of the Chinese Communist Party, President of the People's Republic, and Chairman of the Central Military Commission, presided over the military parade. In addition, all members of the Politburo Standing Committee at the time, along with the former leader Jiang Zemin, stood atop Tiananmen in protocol order for the entire duration of the parade. Other prominent retired leaders, including former Premiers Li Peng and Zhu Rongji, and former Vice President Zeng Qinghong were also in attendance.

=== Military parade ===
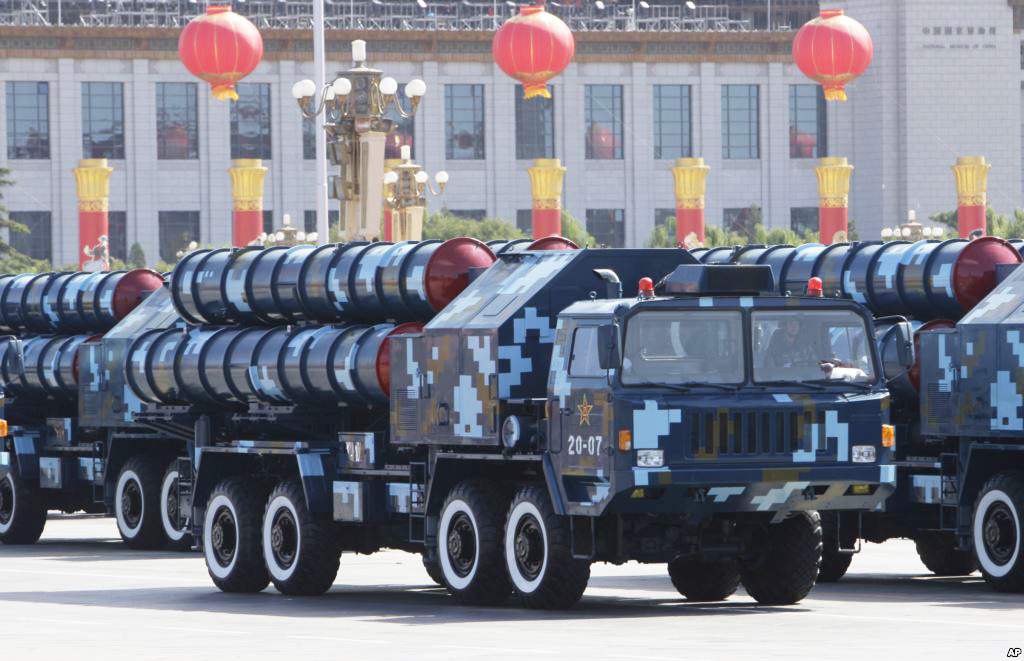
An HQ-9 at China's 60th anniversary parade.

The military parade took place on Chang'an Avenue, with the country's leaders watching the parade from Tiananmen, above Mao's portrait. Hu Jintao inspected the troops standing onto a Hongqi HQE limousine designed for the event, with a special license plate (京V 02009). For the anniversary, the Chinese government budgeted roughly $44 million for the military parade, with some budget cuts due to the 2008 financial crisis. The parade displayed 52 new types of military hardware, including ZTZ99 main battle tanks, J-10 fighter aircraft, KJ-200 and KJ-2000 early-warning aircraft, Z-9W attack helicopters, and new models of the Type 95 and Type 03 assault rifles.

The five new types of missiles were paraded by the Second Artillery Corps. The Second Artillery's display included a total of 108 missiles and was intended to showcase China's strategic deterrence capabilities.

==== List of participating divisions in the parade ====
In order of appearance:

- PLA Combined Guard of honour (Chinese: 中国人民解放军三军仪仗队)
- PLA Ground Force Cadet Officers Square Formation (Chinese: 陆军学员方队)
- PLA Ground Force Infantry Square Formation (Chinese: 陆军步兵方队)
- PLA Ground Force Special Forces Square Formation (Chinese: 陆军特种部队方队)
- PLA Navy Cadet Officers Square Formation (Chinese: 海军学员方队)
- PLA Navy Seamen Square Formation (Chinese: 海军水兵方队)
- PLA Navy Marine Corps Square Formation (Chinese: 海军陆战队方队)
- PLA Air Force Cadet Officers Square Formation (Chinese: 空军飞行学员方队)
- PLA Air Force Paratroopers Square Formation (Chinese: 空军空降兵方队)
- PLA Second Artillery Corps Cadets Square Formation (Chinese: 第二炮兵学员方队)
- PLA Female Soldiers Square Formation (Chinese: 三军女兵方队)
- People's Armed Police Square Formation (Chinese: 武警方队)
- PLA Reserve Service Forces Square Formation (Chinese: 预备役方队)
- Female Militia Square Formation (Chinese: 女民兵方队)

==== List of military vehicles paraded ====
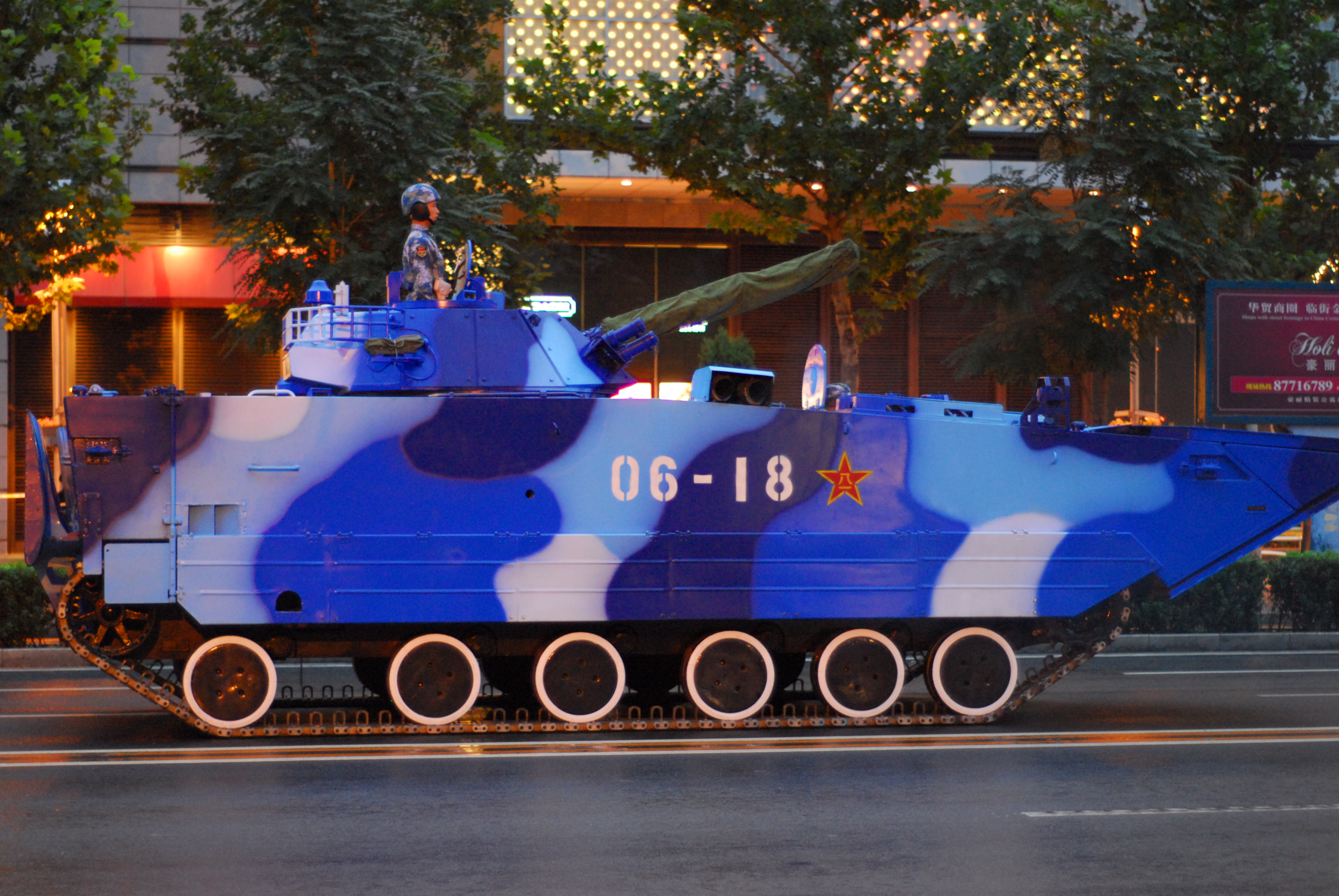
A ZBD2000 amphibious IFV in Beijing during a training exercise.

Chinese official state media states that all equipment displayed in the parade are manufactured in China, with 90% of them first displayed to the public. The equipment are listed in the order of appearance, with new appearances in bold:

- ZTZ99 main battle tank
- ZTZ96A main battle tank
- ZBD2000 amphibious fighting vehicle
- ZBD-97 infantry fighting vehicle
- **ZBL-08/09 infantry fighting vehicle**
- ZLC2000 airborne infantry fighting vehicle
- ZSL-92 anti-riot infantry fighting vehicle
- Type 05 155 mm self-propelled howitzer
- Type 07 122 mm self-propelled howitzer
- PLL-05 120mm self-propelled mortar-howitzer
- PTL02 100mm tank destroyer
- PHL03 300mm multiple launch rocket system
- HJ-9 anti-tank missile system
- Type 95 self-propelled anti-aircraft artillery
- HQ-7 surface-to-air missile
- HQ-16 surface-to-air missile
- YJ-83 anti-ship missile
- **YJ-62 shore to ship cruise missile**
- **HQ-9 surface-to-air missile**
- HQ-12 surface-to-air missile
- **ASN series tactical unmanned aerial drones**
- DF-15 short range ballistic missile
- DF-11 short range ballistic missile
- **CJ-10 land attack cruise missile**
- DF-21 medium range ballistic missile
- DF-31 intercontinental ballistic missile
- DF-31A intercontinental ballistic missile
- KJ-2000 early warning aircraft
- KJ-200 early warning aircraft
- Xian H-6 bomber and tanker
  - along with newer **Xian H-6K** variant
- JH-7A fighter-bomber
- J-8F interceptor fighter
- Chengdu J-10 multirole fighter
- Shenyang J-11 multirole fighter
- Changhe Z-8 transport helicopter
- Harbin Z-9W attack helicopter
- Hongdu JL-8 jet trainer aircraft
- Type 022 stealth missile boat
- Type 052C destroyer
- **Type 054A frigate**

=== Grand pageant (Mass pageant) ===
Sixty floats showcasing themes such as "progress of the motherland", "scientific development", "brilliant achievement", and "beautiful prosperous China" passed by Tiananmen Square. Dozens of floats were surrounded by groups of either 1,949 or 2,009 marchers, with the total number of people marching in the parade being over one hundred thousand. One float had a giant portrait of Mao Zedong, which was immediately followed by similar floats with equally large portraits of Deng Xiaoping, Jiang Zemin, and Hu Jintao. On each of these portraits were inscribed slogans of each leader's signature ideologies: Mao Zedong Thought, Deng Xiaoping Theory, the Three Represents, and the Scientific Development Concept. Voice recordings of each leader were also played through loudspeakers. A float with 181 foreigners from 53 countries named "One World" also took part.

==== List of floats ====
- **Prelude**
  - The Guard of Honor
  - National Emblem Square Array
- **Section One: Struggling and Initiating**
  - "Struggling in Blood" Formation
  - "Founding of New China" Formation
  - Mao Zedong Thought Formation
- **Section Two: Reforming and Opening up**
  - Deng Xiaoping Thought Formation
- **Section Three: Into the New Century**
  - Into the New Century
- **Section Four: China as A Rising Power**
  - Scientific Development Concept

==== List of card sequence slogans ====
- **国庆** National Anniversary
- **National Emblem of the People's Republic of China** with **1949** and **2009**
- **National Flag of the People's Republic of China**
- **Flag of the Chinese People's Liberation Army**
- **Great Wall**
- **中华人民共和国万岁** (Long live the People's Republic of China)
- **中国共产党万岁** (Long live the Chinese Communist Party)
- **人民万岁** (Long live the people)
- **听党指挥** (Submit to rule of the Party)
- **服务人民** (Serve the People)
- **英勇善战** (Be brave and worthy in war)
- **忠诚于党** (Loyal to the Party)
- **热爱人民** (Love the people)
- **报效国家** (Serve the country)
- **献身使命** (Devote to our mission)
- **崇尚荣誉** (Honor our glory)
- **Dove of peace**
- **向人民英雄致敬** (Salute the people's heroes)
- **社会主义好** (Socialism is Good)
- **解放思想** (Liberate thoughts)
- **改革开放** (Reform and opening upup)
- **世纪跨越** (Turn of the century)
- **与时俱进** (Keep pace with the times)
- **科学发展** (Scientific Development)
- **社会和谐** (Socialist Harmonious society)
- **1949**
- **2009**
- **祖国万岁** (Long live the motherland)
- **Wheat wave**
- **科教兴国** (Science and education strengthens the nation)
- **Peony**
- **Logos for Beijing 2008 Olympics and Paralympics**
- **万众一心众志成城**(Unite as one to overcome difficulties)
- **维护世界和平** (Uphold world peace)
- **各族人民大团结万岁** (Long live the great unity of the people of (Chinese) ethnic groups)
- **繁荣昌盛** (Prosperity)
- **国画《江山如此多娇》**
- **富强民主文明和谐** (Prosperous and strong, democratic, culturally-developed and harmonious)
- **时刻准备着** (Constantly prepared)
- **明天会更好** (Tomorrow will be better)

=== Music ===
Flag raising, military parade, drive-by, and flyby

1. Welcome March (欢迎进行曲)
2. March of the Volunteers (National Anthem of the People's Republic of China) (义勇军进行曲)
3. Military Anthem of the People's Liberation Army (中国人民解放军进行曲)
4. Troops Review March of the PLA (Inspection March of the PLA) (检阅进行曲)
5. The People's Army is Loyal to the Party (人民军队忠于党)
6. Military Academy Song (军校之歌)
7. Duty (使命)
8. A Moment to Prepare (时刻准备着)
9. Servicemen (当兵的人)
10. Parade March of the People's Liberation Army (分列式进行曲)
11. Motherland, Please Review (祖国，请检阅)
12. March of Armored Vehicles (战车进行曲)
13. Song of the Loyal Guards (忠诚卫士之歌)
14. March of the Artillery Force (炮兵进行曲)
15. People's Navy, Forward (人民海军向前进)
16. Military Might March (军威进行曲)
17. March of the Second Artillery Corps (第二炮兵进行曲)
18. March of the PLA Air Force (中国空军进行曲)
19. I Love the Motherland's Blue Skies (我爱祖国的蓝天)

Civilian parade

1. Ode to the Red Flag
2. The East Is Red (东方红)
3. Without the Communist Party, There Would Be No New China (没有共产党就没有新中国)
4. Red Banner Hymn (红旗颂)
5. Story of Spring (春天的故事)
6. Youth, Oh, Youth (青春啊青春)
7. Walking Into the New Era (走进新时代)
8. Song of the Yangtze (长江之歌)
9. Rivers and Mountains (江山)
10. Today is your Birthday (My China) (今天是你的生日)
11. On the Field of Hope (在希望的田野上)
12. We Workers Have Strength (咱们工人有力量)
13. Toast Song (祝酒歌)
14. The Red Flag Flutters (红旗飘飘)
15. You and Me (我和你)
16. Melody of Welcome Greeting (迎宾曲)
17. Love My China (爱我中华)
18. China Navigates (领航中国)
19. Walking towards Rejuvenation (走向复兴)
20. Anthem of the Young Pioneers of China (中国少年先锋队队歌)
21. Songs and Smiles (歌声与微笑)
22. Ode to the Motherland (歌唱祖国)

=== Broadcast ===
China Central Television was responsible for the live broadcast of the National Day celebrations and military parade, from 8:00 am (CST) to noon, on CCTV-1, CCTV-3, CCTV-4, CCTV-7, CCTV-10, CCTV-12, CCTV News Channel, CCTV-HD and CCTV Music Channel, as well as in other languages (English, French, Spanish, Arabic and Russian on each of their respective language international channels), both on TV and online. CCTV-9 (English) rebroadcast the celebrations at 16:00, 24:00, and 7:00 (2 October).

China National Radio provided live audio coverage throughout mainland China on CNR channels 1, 2, 3, 4, and 9; the Hong Kong and Macau region on CNR channel 7; and Taiwan on CNR channel 5.

== National Day Evening Gala ==
On the evening of 1 October, from 20:00 to 22:00, a music concert of 28 patriotic Chinese songs was performed with hundreds of dancers in Tiananmen Square, with a series of massive fireworks displays overhead. Early media reports earlier predicted that the fireworks presentation would be "double the firepower of the 2008 Olympics opening ceremony". CCTV viewers and Internet users around the world were also both able to watch the live broadcast of the gala.

=== Songs ===
Prelude
My Motherland

Chapter One
Great Motherland

1. I Love China
2. Our Motherland Is A Garden
3. Paean
4. Xinjiang Is A Good Place
5. Emancipated Serfs Sing Proudly
6. Bellflower Song
7. Flower and Youth
8. Folk Songs Are Like The Spring Water
9. A-Li Mountain Girls
10. Our Motherland Is A Garden (slightly different; repeated as a closing to the chapter)

Chapter Two
Our Birth Place

1. Today Is Your Birthday
2. On The Land of Hope
3. China March
4. The New Look of Our Motherland
5. A Toast Song
6. Good Days

Chapter Three
On This Vast Land

1. Proud Builders
2. Youthful China
3. Let's Swing Our Oars
4. Great China
5. Young Friends Get Together
6. Meeting Twenty Years Later

Chapter Four
Sunshine Everywhere

1. The Sunny Way
2. Road To Rejuvenation
3. Waltz of Youth And Friendship
4. Ode to the Motherland
5. Firmly We Hold Our Hands*
6. Country And Home*

(" * " denotes a translation of the song's title different from the officially provided CCTV title)

== Commemorative coins and stamps ==
Front and back of a limited edition (100) one-kilogram gold commemorative coin with a face value of 10,000 yuan.

Three types of gold coins and two types of silver coins were issued by the People's Bank of China on 16 September to commemorate the anniversary. A total of 60,700 gold coins with face values of CN¥10,000, 2,000 yuan, and 100 yuan were issued, while a total of 106,000 silver coins with the face values of 300 and 10 yuan issued. All the coins, produced by Shenzhen Guobao Mint and Shenyang Mint and distributed by the China Gold Coin Incorporation, are legal tender.

The obverse of the coins features China's national emblem, set in a frieze of peonies. The reverse includes various designs including a rocket, a satellite, a high-speed train, and the Beijing Olympic Stadium. Other forms will show designs of an open gate, a bridge, or urban construction. They bear Chinese characters saying: "In commemoration of the 60th anniversary of the founding of the People's Republic of China, 1949–2009."

On 20 October 2009, the China National Philatelic Corporation issued three collections in commemoration of the 60th Anniversary. There are two stamp albums priced at CN¥380 and CN¥680 and a stamp scroll priced at CN¥1,280.Hongkong Post issues a set of six commemorative stamps and a stamp sheetlet on 1 October. Unlike most stamps, the set of stamps are fan-shaped and form a circle when placed together (as seen in the souvenir sheet configuration). Their pictorial design is based on the winning entries of a competition: Victoria Harbour and Tiananmen Square are depicted on two interlocking cogwheels on the HK$1.40 stamp; the five-star national flag flying by the side of the "Forever Blooming Bauhinia" (HK$1.80). The Bird's Nest stadium is on the HK$2.40, while China's crewed spacecraft Shenzhou 7 is depicted on the HK$2.50. The Temple of Heaven features on the HK$3 value and a golden dragon soaring above the Great Wall adorns the HK$5 stamp. A souvenir sheet features all six stamps, which form a perfect ring with the accompanying number "6", together forming the number "60". Hong Kong's stamp sheetlet has two HK$5 stamps in Chinese red, one featuring Beijing and one Victoria. The National Emblem and Tiananmen appear on the left and the Regional Emblem above a night view of Hong Kong.

== Celebrations abroad ==
The Empire State Building in New York City lit up in red and yellow lights to commemorate the occasion; the gesture in turn drew criticism that included those from US politicians. The lights first ignited on the eve of 30 September, and lasted for the duration of the following day.

China's ally and neighbouring state, Pakistan, issued a commemorative postage stamp of five rupees on 1 October.

== Incidents and protests ==
=== Kyodo reporters assault ===
On 18 September 2009, three employees from the Japanese Kyodo News agency were assaulted by officials in their Beijing hotel room as they tried to cover the rehearsals of the parade. China's Foreign Ministry stated that the reporters did not comply with a notification to news organisations to not cover the rehearsal.

=== Hong Kong protests ===
Approximately 800 protesters, dressed in black and holding banners, participated in a human rights protest which started at Chater Garden in Central, Hong Kong. Scuffles broke out when activists tried to carry a mock coffin to the doorstep of the liaison office. The music group My Little Airport also performed a song named "I Love The Country, But Not The Party" (我愛郊野，但不愛派對), using a pun on the 60th anniversary; its Chinese title literally translates "Country" to mean the rural area and "Party" to mean a "social gathering".

== See also ==
- 70th anniversary of the People's Republic of China
- Golden Week
- 2009 Moscow Victory Day Parade
- Arirang Festival Mass Games
- 100th Anniversary of the Republic of China
