= Women's Military Band of the PLA National Defense University =

Musical unit in the People's Liberation Army

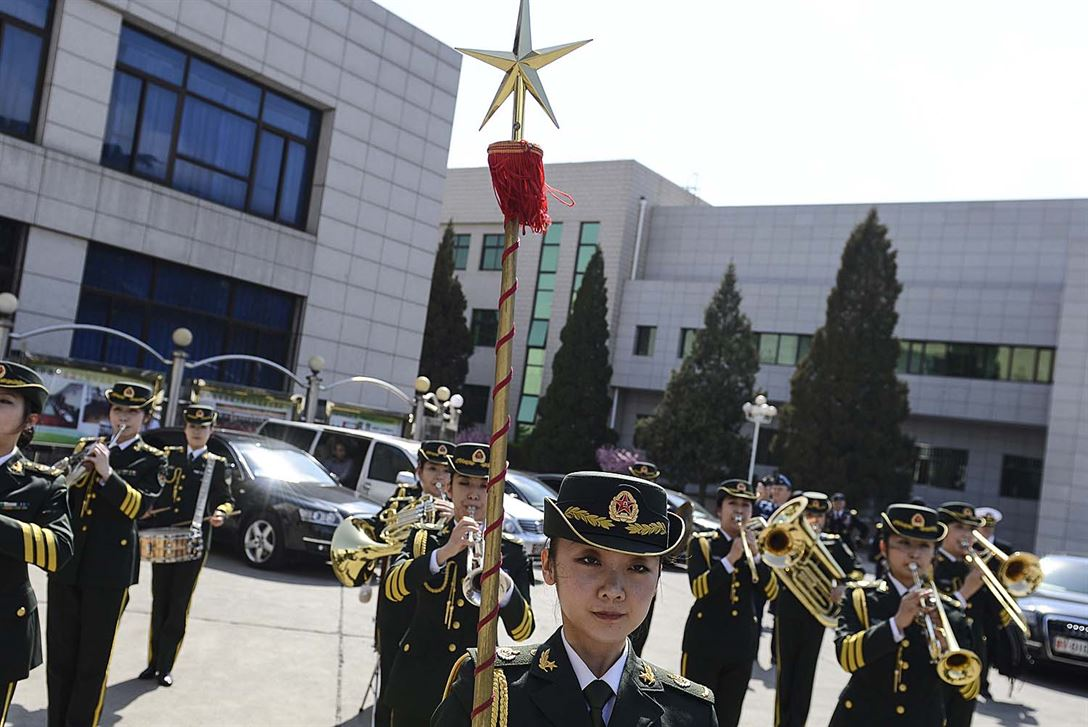
The band during the arrival of General Martin E. Dempsey at the PLA National Defence University, April 2013.

The Women's Military Band of the PLA National Defense University (Chinese: 国防大学女子军乐队) is a Chinese military band that uniquely consists of only female cadets at the PLA National Defence University, where it serves as the official cadet band. It was established in September 1987 as the only purely female military band of People's Liberation Army (PLA) to greet foreign delegations. In its first 25 years of existence, it had visited over 100 countries and since 2008, the band has the duty of performing for visiting high-ranking officials to the NDU. This tradition began during the visit of NATO Deputy Chief of Staff to the NDU that year. It has officially been praised as "the best amateur military band of the PLA" by the Central Military Commission. The band drum major serves as one of the deputy directors of the joint-military band during military parades such as those on the National Day Parade on 1 October. In January 2016, the Military Museum of the Chinese People's Revolution awarded the band and specifically the band's leadership for their role in the joint-military massed band that was present during the 2015 China Victory Day Parade the previous September as it was the first time any female soldiers had been part of the massed bands. Despite being part of the NDU, the band, like all other Chinese military bands, fall under the supervision of the Political Work Department of the Central Military Commission.
