= Song of the Military and Political University of Resistance Against Japan =

The "Song of the Military and Political University of Resistance Against Japan" (simplified Chinese: 抗日军政大学校歌; traditional Chinese: 抗日軍政大學校歌; pinyin: Kàng Rì Jūn Zhèng Dà Xué Xiào Gē), also known as the "Military Academy Song" (simplified Chinese: 军校之歌; traditional Chinese: 軍校之歌; pinyin: Jūn Xiào Zhī Gē), is a patriotic song of the People's Republic of China. It was the anthem of the Counter-Japanese Military and Political University and is the anthem of the present day PLA National Defence University. It is also commonly played during military parades. The lyrics were written by Kai Feng and the music composed by Lu Ji in November 1937.

== Lyrics ==
黄河之滨，集合着一群中华民族优秀的子孙；

huánghé zhī bīn, jíhézhù yīqún zhōnghuá mínzú yōuxiù de zǐsūn;

On the Yellow River's banks gather a group of outstanding descendants of the Chinese nation;

人类解放，救国的责任，全靠我们自己来担承。

rénlèi jiěfàng, jiùguó de zérèn, quán kào wǒmen zìjǐ lái dān chéng.

The responsibility of liberating humanity, and saving the country, is entirely dependent on us!

同学们，努力学习，团结、紧张、严肃、活泼，我们的作风；

Tóngxuémen, nǔlì xuéxí, tuánjié, jǐnzhāng, yánsù, huópō, wǒmen de zuòfēng;

Fellow students, study hard, togetherness alertness, liveliness, and seriousness is our style;

同学们，积极工作，艰苦奋斗，英勇牺牲，我们的传统。

tóngxuémen, jījí gōngzuò, jiānkǔ fèndòu, yīngyǒng xīshēng, wǒmen de chuántǒng.

Fellow students, work hard, hard work, and heroic sacrifice are our traditions.

像黄河之水，汹涌澎湃，把日寇驱逐于国土之东。

Xiàng huánghé zhī shuǐ, xiōngyǒng péngpài, bǎ rì kòu qūzhú yú guótǔ zhī dōng.

Like the Yellow River, surging and surging, throw the Japanese brigands to the East from our land!

向着新社会前进，前进，我们是抗日者的先锋！

Xiàngzhe xīn shèhuì qiánjìn, qiánjìn, wǒmen shì kàngrì zhě de xiānfēng!

Forward, towards a New Society, we are the worker's vanguard!
