= People's Liberation Army Air Force Female Band =

Musical unit in the People's Liberation Army

The People's Liberation Army Air Force Female Band (Chinese: 空军女子军乐队) is a Chinese female amateur military band that is part of the PLA Air Force. The band was established in 1996 as an 8-member marching band. Today, it currently is composed of 56 musicians and part of the PLAAF Communications Branch. Despite being a female oriented band, in recent years it has also included male soldiers in its ranks to try and make it more pan-PLAAF.

== Activities ==
The band has since 1999 had a presenceat the National Day Parade on 1 October, with its drum major serving as one of the deputy directors of the joint-military band during the military parade. It has, over 300 times, participated in events such as military tattoos within and outside the People's Republic of China on behalf of the PLAAF. The band has participated in social events like the Vietnam Youth Friendship Meeting or the China-Africa Youth Festival. It has performed in the Great Hall of the People 12 times in 5 consecutive years. In 2017, it performed at the 5th Nanchang International Military Tattoo in Nanchang, Jiangxi Province. In 2014 and 2018, it participated in the Shanghai Cooperation Organization Military Tattoo at Zhurihe Training Base and in Beijing respectively.
