= People's Armed Police Band =

Chinese military band

- 人民武装警察乐队
- Active: 1986 - present
- Country: China
- Branch: People's Armed Police
- Type: Military Band
- Garrison/HQ: Beijing
- Nickname: PAP Band

Commanders
- Director: Yuan Xinhai
- Notable commanders: Du Yinjiao (artistic director of the jazz band)

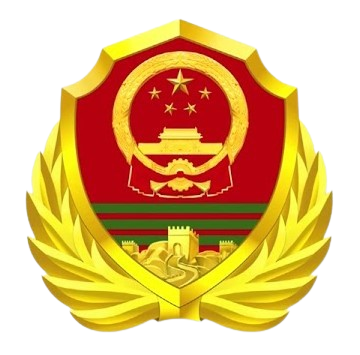
Emblem of the Chinese People's Armed Police Force

The People's Armed Police Band (Chinese: 人民武装警察乐队) is the sole military music unit of the Chinese People's Armed Police (PAP) and one of the four premier military bands in the People's Republic of China. It is currently under the command of the Central Military Commission's Political Work Department and the Political Department of the PAP. It is the sole police band operating in mainland China and it represents the PAP and the Ministry of Public Security at state events.

Founded in 1986, the Band is notable for its responsibility of the monthly performance of March of the Volunteers at the national flagpole at Tiananmen Square, during a flag raising ceremony which is done with the Beijing Garrison Honor Guard Battalion and formerly with the PAP Honour Guard Battalion.

== History ==
The Band participated in the celebration of the 40th anniversary of the founding of the People's Republic of China on behalf of the PAP in 1989. It also participated in the celebrations and parades in honor of the 50th and 60th anniversaries, as well as the 70th anniversary of the end of World War II.

During National Day parades every decade, the PAP Band often jointly undertakes performance tasks with the other two senior military bands (the Central Military Band of the PLA and the People's Liberation Army Navy Band).

In 1990, it assumed its first major task in front of an international audience by performing the national anthem at the opening ceremony of the Beijing Asian Games. It has made several visits abroad, with some of the first being the opening ceremony of the World Police Games in Italy in 1991, and the World Police Concert in Japan. Concerts in honor of anniversaries have also taken place. In 1998 and 2002, concerts were held in honor of the one and five year anniversaries of Hong Kong joining the PRC. A twenty-year anniversary concert for the band was held in 2006.

The Band participated in the first China International Wind Music Festival in 1995, the 2011 Nanchang International Military Music Festival and the 2016 Shanghai Cooperation Organization Military Tattoo. In late June 2018, the band took part in the annual Eskeri Kernei ("Military Trumpet") International Festival at the Astana Hockey Hall, performing pieces such as Hands Across the Sea and Ode to the Motherland, after which it was bestowed a certificate of merit and a trophy by Lieutenant General Ruslan Zhaksilikov of the National Guard of Kazakhstan.

On 1 October 1990, the "National Flag Law" was adopted, stating that the national anthem must be played when raising the national flag. On 1 May 1991, with the approval of the State Council of China, the new flag-raising ceremony was officially launched. Right after the performance of the anthem, the band then played Ode to the Motherland as the ceremony came to a close. The size of the band during this ceremony is generally 62 personnel (60 musicians and 2 conductors).

== See also ==
- Central Military Band of the People's Liberation Army of China
- People's Liberation Army Navy Band
- People's Armed Police Honour Guard Battalion
