= People's Armed Police Honour Guard Battalion =

- 中国人民武装警察部队仪仗队
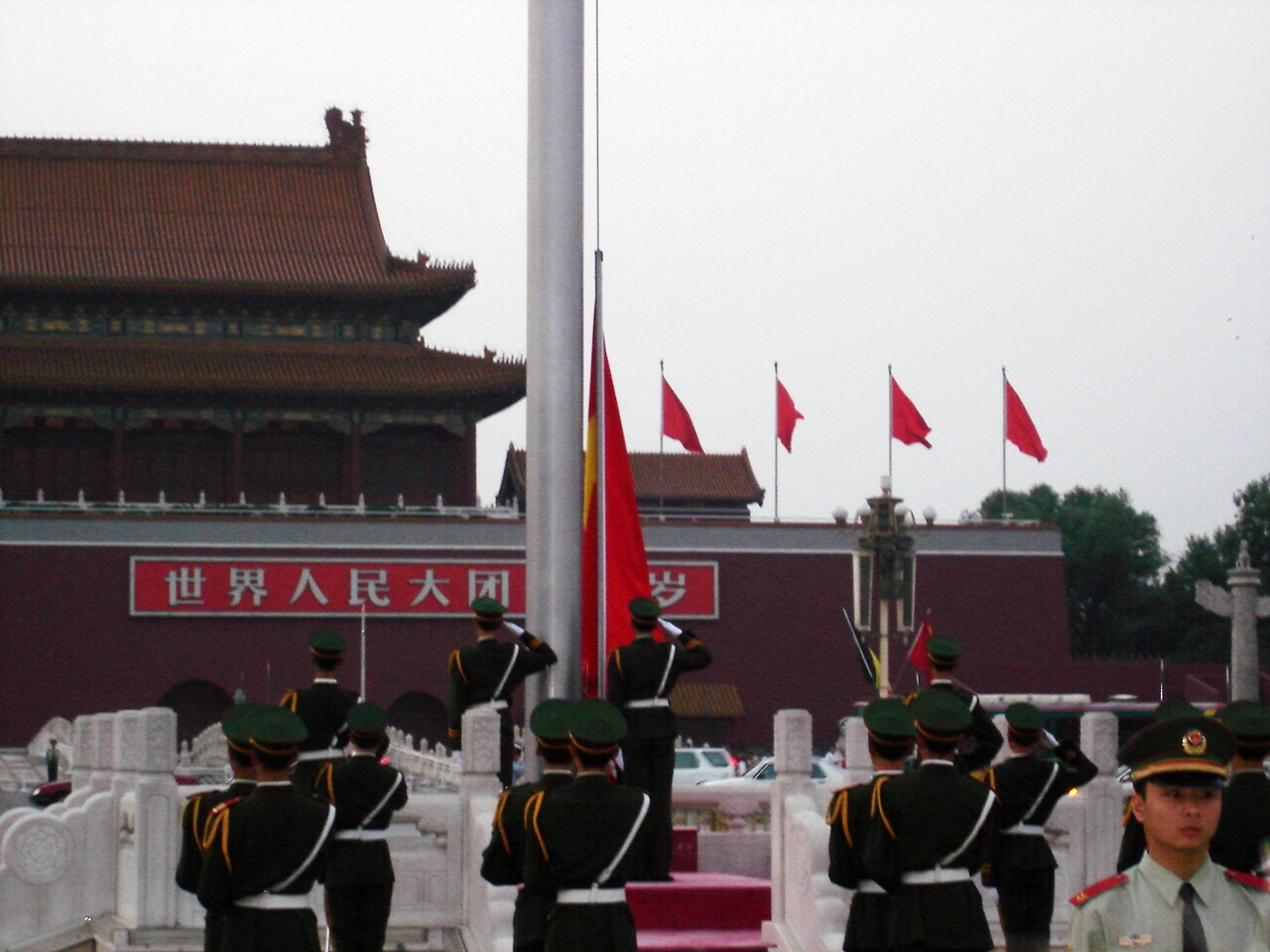
- Members of the battalion in June 2006.
- Active: 1984–Present
- Country: China
- Allegiance: Chinese Communist Party
- Branch: People's Armed Police
- Type: Honor Guard
- Role: Public duties
- Part of: PAP Beijing Brigade; 1st Mobile Contingent Command
- Garrison/HQ: Beijing
- Nickname: PAP Honor Guard
- Colors: Green and Red

The People's Armed Police Honour Guard Battalion (Chinese: 中国人民武装警察部队仪仗队), also known as the PAP Honor Guard, is the main honor guard and police unit of the People's Armed Police of China, the country's Gendarmerie force.

Since then, it has been a part of the Beijing Mobile Detachment, 1st Mobile Contingent Command (since 2018), formerly as part of the 1st Division, BAPC.

== History ==
It was formed on 23 November 1984 in the aftermath of the state celebrations of the 35th anniversary of the People's Republic of China.

In 1987, the eleventh battalion of the 8th Division of the Beijing Armed Police Corps was reorganized into the 7th Battalion of the BAPC. In 2005, it was reorganized into the 13th Battalion, 1st Division. Later changed to the 11th Battalion, nicknamed the ceremonial battalion.

== Duties ==
Its duties include:

- Representing the PAP at public events
- Providing honours for high ranking national and CPC leaders
- Providing guards of honour for military parades
- Conduct the Flag Raising Ceremony (1982-2018)

On 1 May 2016, the PAP renewed the new nameplate, chestplate and armband. The new armbands are divided into general armbands and eight special service armbands, one of which is used on the dress uniforms of the guard of honor.

== Major activities ==
The guardsmen of the honor guard have had the honor of being present during important state visits to the PRC. It has also provided ceremony duties such as the march in of the Flag of China during social events such as the 11th Asian Games, the 2008 Summer Olympics, and the World Conference on Women, 1995.

Domestic events included all Chinese National Day Parades and the 2015 China Victory Day Parade, during which it raised the flag of China at the outset and provided ceremonial security for the inspection. Among other events, it also took part in the 2001 Universiade, Expo 2010, 2013 Asian Youth Games and the 2014 Summer Youth Olympics.

== National Color Guard ==
The Beijing National Color Guard Company of the People's Armed Police, active from 1984 to 2017, was responsible for the execution of the raising and lowering the national flag at Tiananmen Square every day. In the evening, a flag-lowering ceremony would take place in preparation for the next day.

In 2018, the People's Liberation Army took control of the ceremony from the PAP following the attachment of the National Color Guard Company to the PLA Honour Guard, which according to the Xinhua News Agency, marked a "new era" of national civil-military ceremonies.

== See also ==
- People's Armed Police Band
