= China Victory Day Parade =

China Victory Day Parade may refer to:

- 2015 China Victory Day Parade
- 2025 China Victory Day Parade

== See also ==
- Chinese National Day Parade
