= Flag Raising Ceremony =

Chinese military ceremony

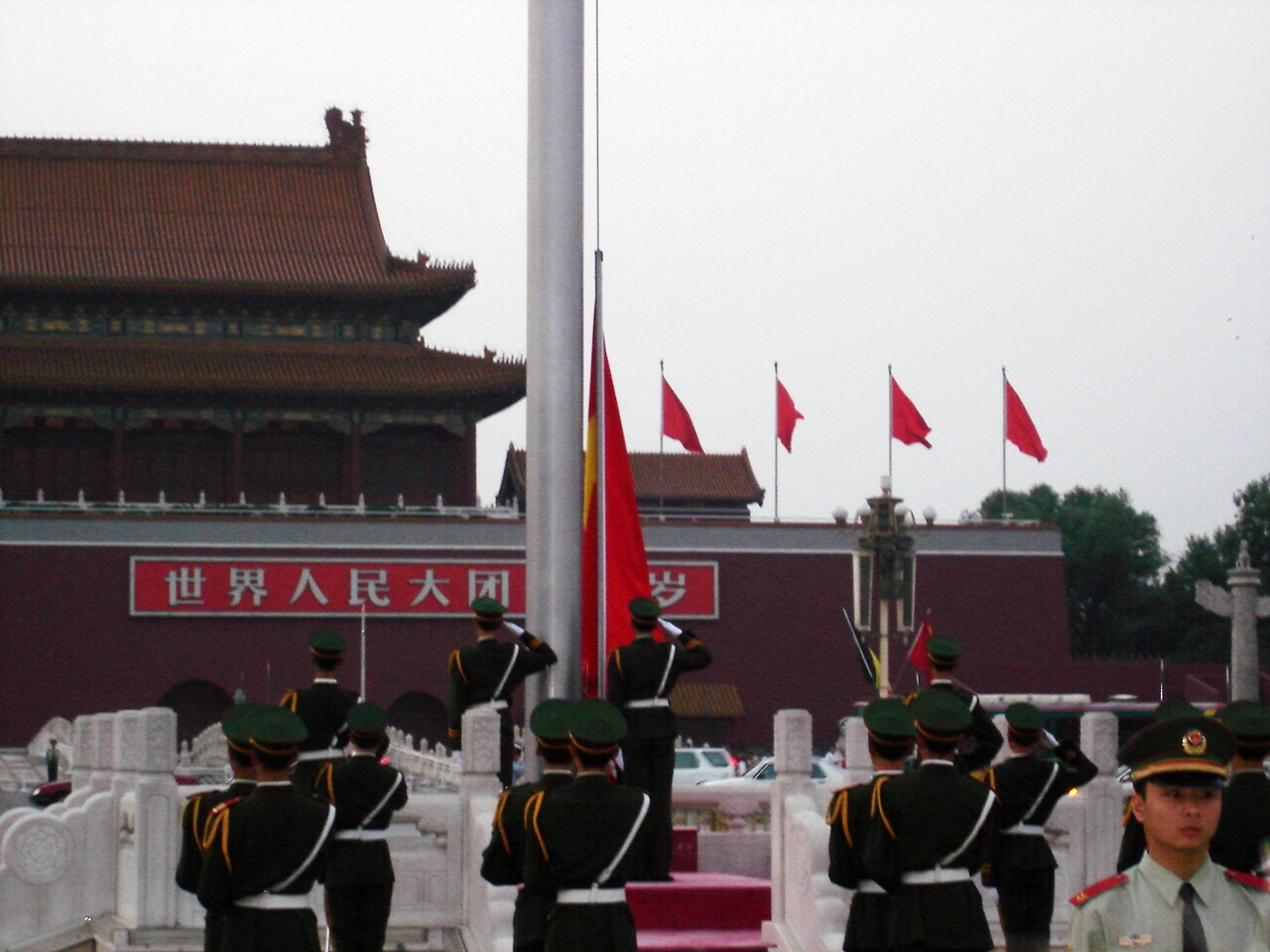
A detail from the People's Armed Police preparing to raise the flag.

The Flag Raising Ceremony is a traditional military ceremony of the People's Liberation Army (PLA) of China which is done publicly in Tiananmen Square, a public square located in the capital of Beijing. The tradition started in 1954 under Mao Zedong. The ceremony is conducted by the PLA's Beijing Garrison Honor Guard Battalion, which is part of the 1st Guard Division, Central Theater Command. It is done daily precisely at sunrise, with notable ceremonies taking place on National Day of the People's Republic of China in October and New Year's Day in January.

== Description ==
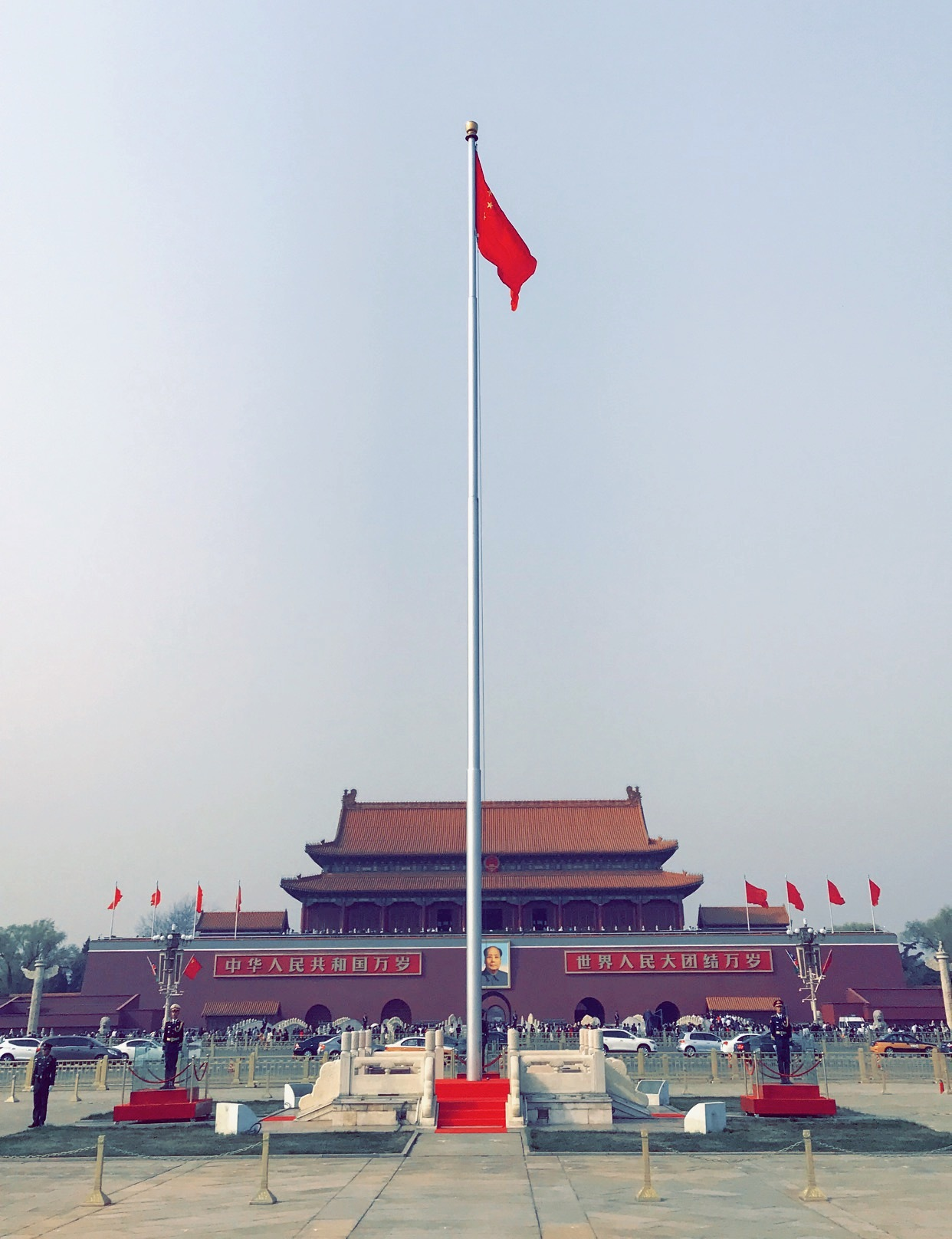
Tiananmen Square flag at full-mast.

Upon marching out of the Tiananmen Gate and the Golden Water Bridge, following the sounding of a fanfare, the unit commander for the Beijing Garrison Honor Guard Battalion orders the unit to begin goosestepping in slow time, when it crosses the bridge, it returns to its normal pace and splits off to have two formations on each side of the flagpole while the color guard moves into position. The commander will then give the command, "Salute to the flag", which is effectively the order for the unit to present arms and raise the flag. Once this is done, the PLA Central Band plays March of the Volunteers as the flag is unfurled and raised precisely with the timing of the Sun rising, after which Ode to the Motherland is performed (only the first day of a month) and dozens of birds are released past the flag as the color company forms up for the march off.

== History ==
The first flag-raising ceremony on Tiananmen Square took place on 1 October 1949 during the Proclamation of the People's Republic of China. After that, the raising of the flag was done by electrical means for two decades, with" exceptions to this being done on 1 October. An official ceremony was inaugurated in May 1977 with the three PLA soldiers from Weifang raising the flag. This continued until 28 December 1982, when the newly formed People's Armed Police and its honour guard took over the ceremony which would last for 35 years. In December 1992, on the basis of the original flag guard, the National Color Guard was expanded into a battalion-sized unit of the PAP. The detachment was called the Tiananmen Guard Detachment. On New Year's Day in 2018, the People's Liberation Army took over command of the ceremony, with a 96-man composite national color guard company made up of guardsmen from the service branches (the PLA Ground Force, Navy and Air Force). This followed the then-recent attachment of the Beijing Garrison Color Guard Company to the BGHGB which led to its reformation, this time, with PLA personnel. According to the Xinhua News Agency (the official state-run press agency of the PRC), the changes marked a "new era" of national civil-military ceremonies.

== Similar ceremonies in the country ==
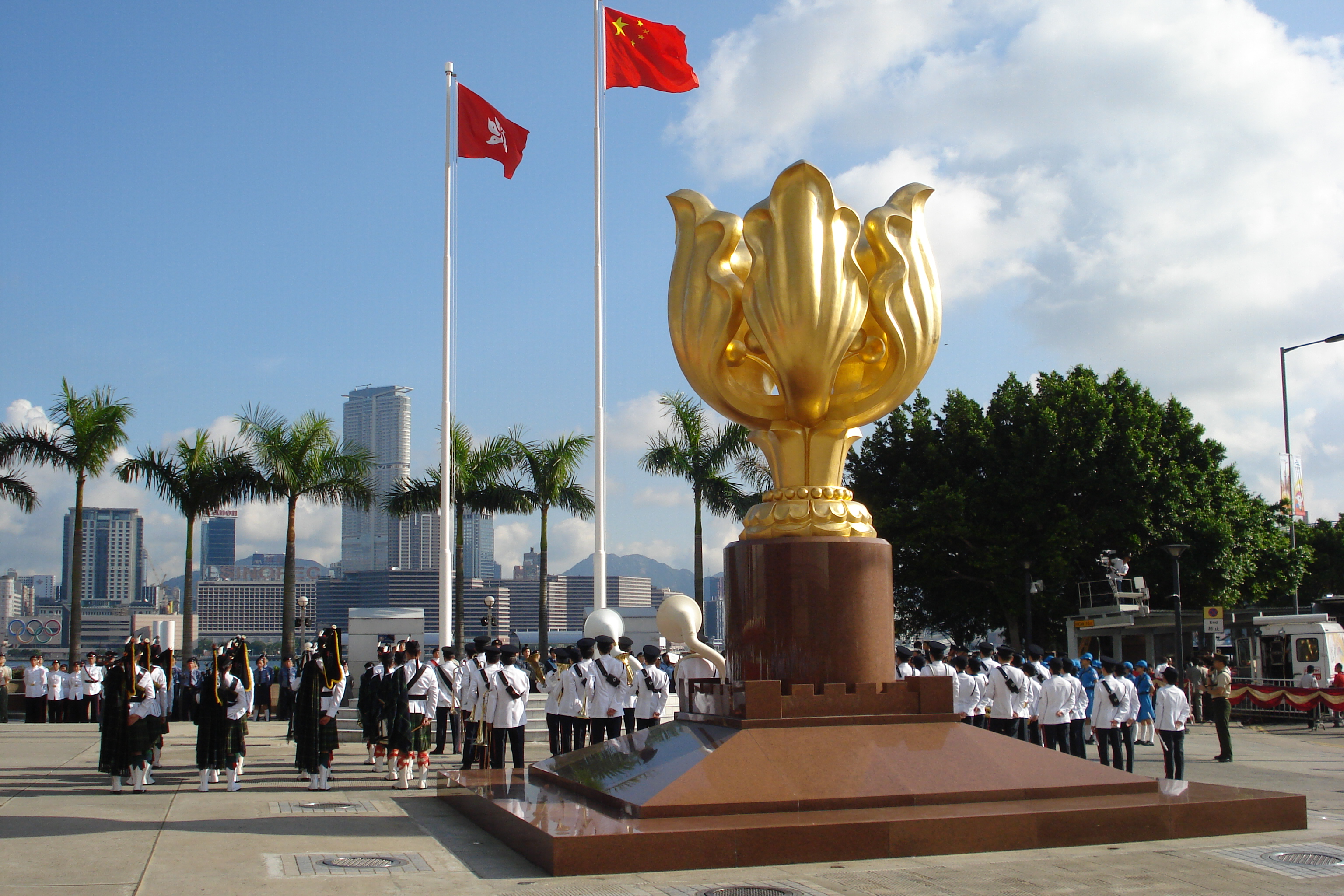
A flag raising ceremony in Hong Kong conducted on 30 August 2008 to welcome national athletes from Mainland China.

- In Hong Kong, a daily flag raising ceremony at Golden Bauhinia Square near the Hong Kong Convention and Exhibition Centre. It is conducted by the Hong Kong Police Force and is divided into three types of ceremonies, a daily one (raising the flag), and enhanced ceremony (on the 1st of every month-raising the flag and playing the national anthem) and a special ceremony (Establishment Day and National Day). The "Establishment Day and National Day ceremony" includes the playing of the national anthem by the Hong Kong Police Band followed by a 10-minute musical performance by the band.
- Annually on April 23, a flag raising ceremony also takes place in Nanjing to commemorate the anniversary of the Yangtze River Crossing Campaign, in which the Chinese Communist Party captured the capital of the Republic of China, who moved the government to Guangzhou and later Taipei in the late stages of the Chinese Civil War.

== See also ==
- Posting the Colors
- Presentation of Colours
- Speech Under the Flag
