= Republic of China Army Band =

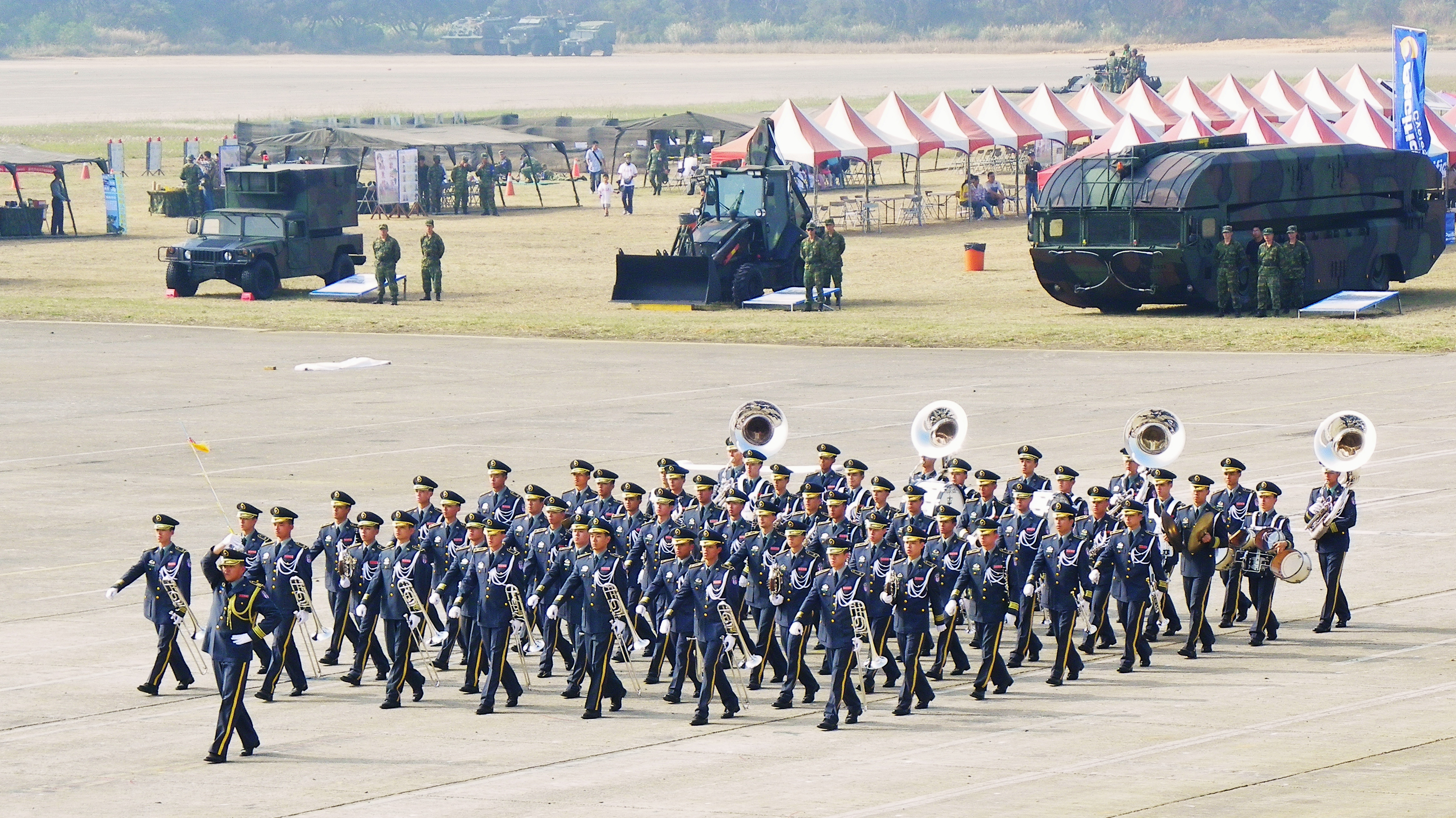
The ROC Army Band on the Hukou Review Ground.

The Republic of China Army Band (Chinese: 中華民國陸軍樂隊) is a musical unit of the Republic of China Army used for state ceremonies and public duties, serving as one of the oldest and seniormost military bands in the Chinese National Armed Forces, being the second to the Symphonic Band of the Ministry of National Defense of the ROC. The band was founded on April 16, 1950 as a result of the reorganization of the Army Command on the basis of prior ensembles.

It is the main band that marches at official ceremonies and receptions for the high-ranking officials who recognize the Republic of China government that visit Taipei, which includes heads of state, heads of government, and diplomatic delegations. One of the band's main appearances is at the Double Ten Parade in October as part of the combined ROCAF massed bands. The army band, like other Taiwanese military bands are inspired by American and German military band traditions, with a notable aspect being the use of a whistle for commands, a tradition only found in United States military bands. The military band starks in contrast to the People's Liberation Army Band, which was also influenced in German and most of the Soviet/Russian traditions.

== See also ==
- People's Liberation Army Navy Band
