= Du Yinjiao =

Du Yinjiao (Chinese: 杜银鲛; pinyin: Dù Yínjiǎo; born 1965 in China) is a Chinese saxophonist.

He began his musical career in a music regiment of the People's Liberation Army. In the 1980s he became interested in jazz music, which was at that time virtually unknown in China. In the face of official disapproval, he taught himself to play jazz by studying and transcribing contraband jazz tapes and books.

Since the 1990s Du has been one of the two most prominent Chinese jazz musicians (the other being the saxophonist Liu Yuan). He directs an 18-piece big band and leads a weekly jam session at the Sān Wèi Shū Wū (三味书屋, Three Flavor Teahouse) in Beijing, where he lives. He was also involved in the organization of the former Beijing Jazz Festival. He has recorded with the Chinese jazz pianist Xia Jia.

Du plays soprano, alto, tenor, and baritone saxophones, and is currently developing the "Du Yinjiao saxophone," a Chinese-made line of saxophones bearing his name.
