= People's Liberation Army Navy Band =

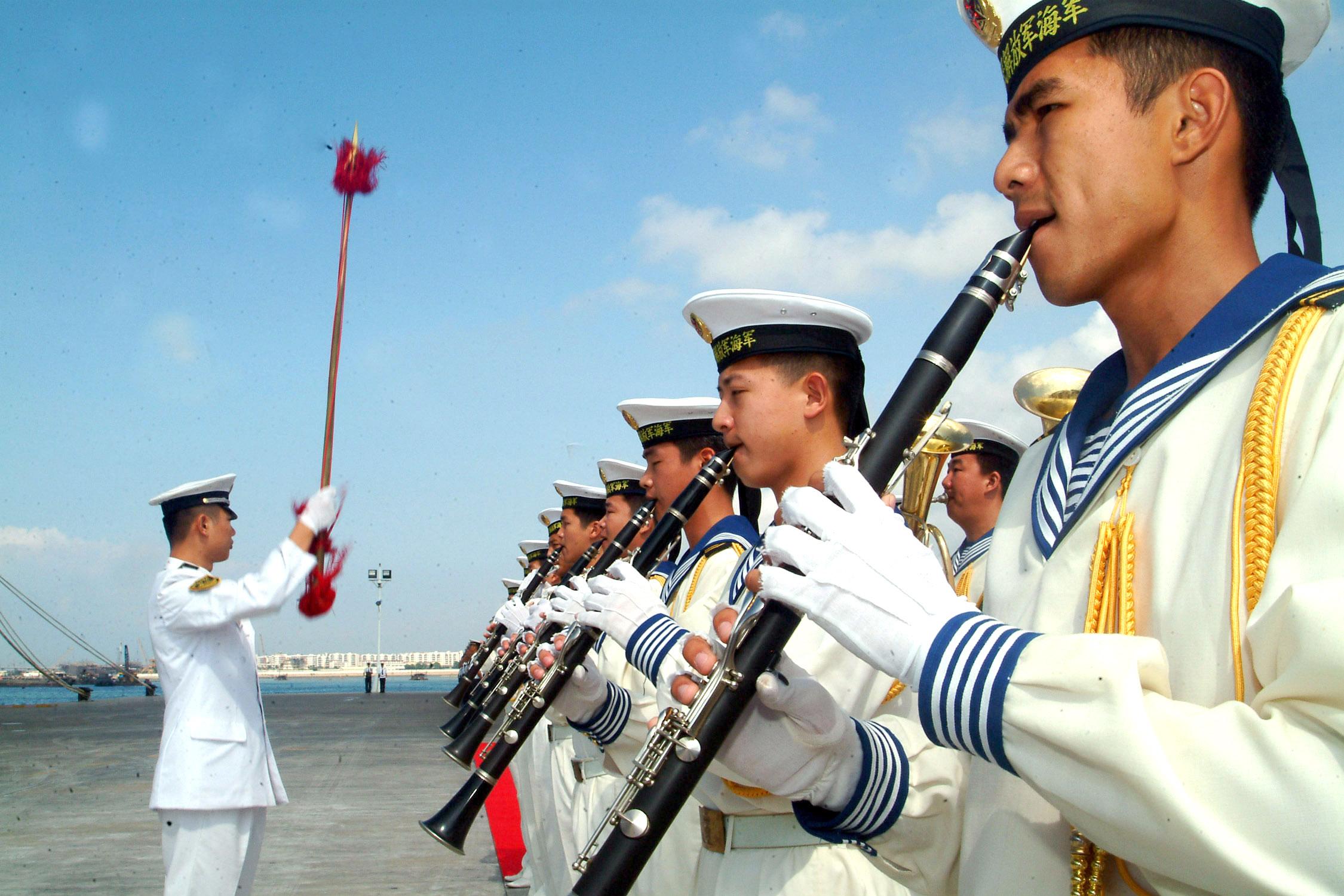
- The PLAN Band plays music during the farewell ceremony for the USS Juneau (LPD-10) in 2006.
- Active: 1986 - present
- Country: China
- Branch: People's Liberation Army Navy
- Type: Military Band
- Garrison/HQ: 191 Yangshuzhuang, Fengtai District, Beijing
- Nickname(s): PLA Navy Band; PLAN Band
- March: The People's Navy Marches Forward (unofficially)

Commanders
- Notable commanders: Colonel Li Xing

The People's Liberation Army Navy Band (Chinese: 中国人民解放军海军军乐团) is the premier military music unit of the Chinese People's Liberation Army Navy (PLAN) and one of the three premier military bands in the People's Republic of China. It is currently under the command of the Political Department of the People's Liberation Army Navy and the supervision of the Central Military Commission's Political Work Department.

== History ==
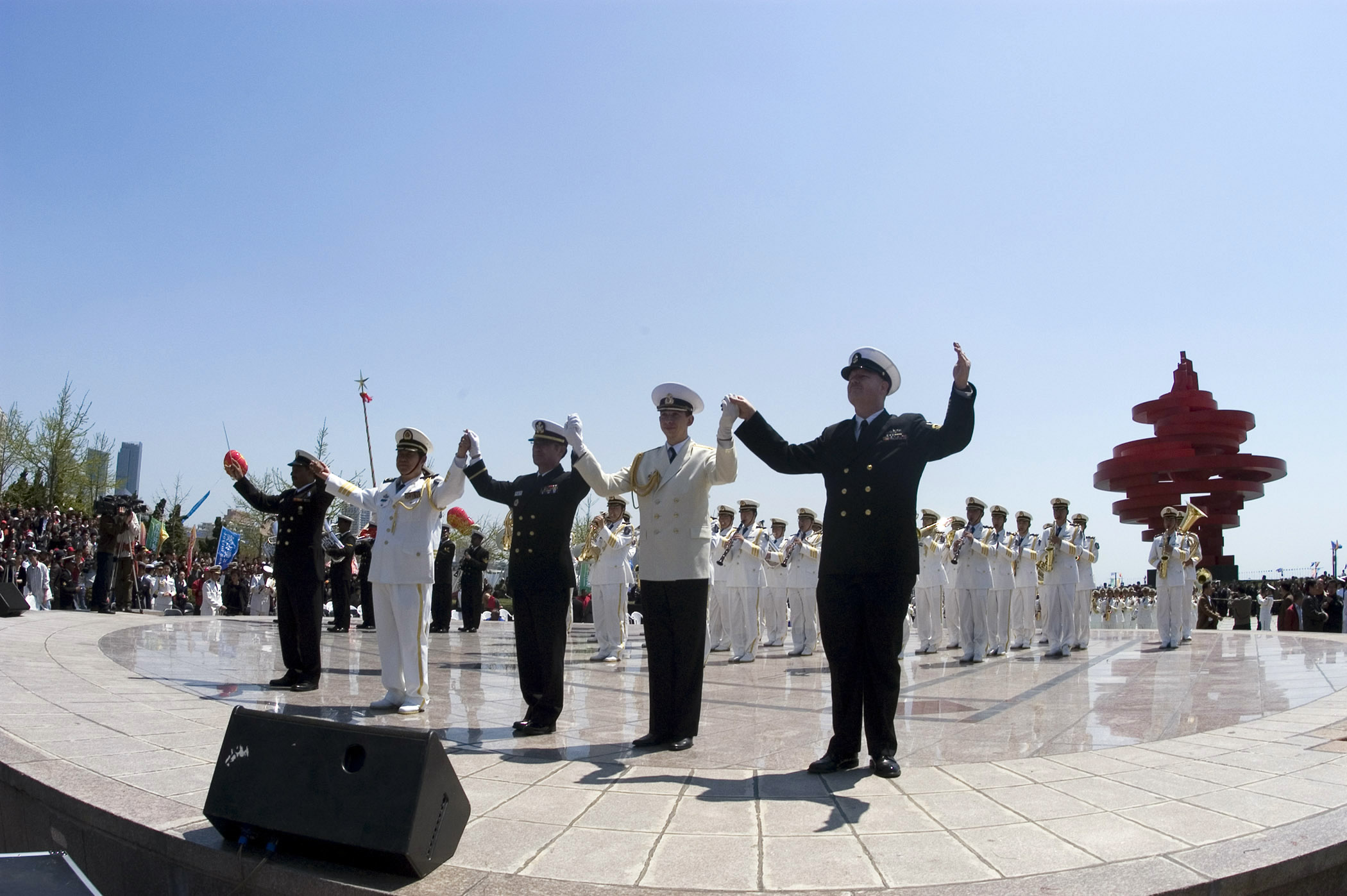
The band performing behind bandleaders from China, Russia, India, and South Korea during the People's Liberation Army Navy Fleet Review in 2009.

The band was formed in February 1986. It is the only professional ceremonial performance unit of the PLAN. It was established during a period of reforms in the PLA Central Band, which was the only band in the PLA at the time. As of 2007, the PLA Navy Band has visited more than 40 countries in the pacific and around the world. The band in 1999, under the direction and baton of its conductor, Captain Li Xing, took part in the military parade held on Beijing's Tiananmen Square in honor of the celebrations of the 50th anniversary of the People's Republic of China. Li served as the conductor of the 1000-strong massed bands present at the parade and was awarded the first place prize for best military band.

In 2004, the band was ordered by the Ministry of National Defense to send a team of faculty from the band members to Mali to conduct military-learning instruction course for the Mali National Military Band. This is the first military music support in the history of the PLAN. As a token of appreciation to the PLAN Band, Mali awarded the members of the group the Mali Military Knight Medal and the Senior Military Officer Medal. In July 2010, at the invitation of the Malian government, the band took part in state celebrations for the 50th anniversary of Malian Independence. In April 2019, the band performed during the PLA Navy Platinum Jubilee Parade.

Since its establishment in 1991, Zhengzhou National Defense Science and Technology School has sent dozens of musicians to the PLA Navy Band.

== See also ==
- Central Military Band of the People's Liberation Army of China
- Beijing Garrison Honor Guard Battalion
