= Speech Under the Flag =

The Speech Under the Flag (Chinese: 国旗下讲话; pinyin: Guóqí xià jiǎnghuà) is a common part of the flag-raising ceremony in kindergartens, primary schools and middle schools in the People's Republic of China since the 1990s. The speech is given by teachers, model workers, advanced figures and outstanding students in front of their classmates. It is part of the patriotic education in China. It aims to strengthen the sense of mission and responsibility of kindergarten students and above to "love the motherland". The flag-raising speech is a regulation made by the Ministry of Education in accordance with the 1990 Law of the People's Republic of China on the National Flag. It is widely implemented in schools in mainland China, and academic papers have been studying it since 1996.

== History ==
In 2019, due to the Hong Kong protests, some have suggested that primary and secondary schools in Macau and Hong Kong should also implement the national flag raising and lowering system.
