= Central Military Band of the People's Liberation Army of China =

Central Military Band of People's Liberation Army of China
- 中国人民解放军军乐队
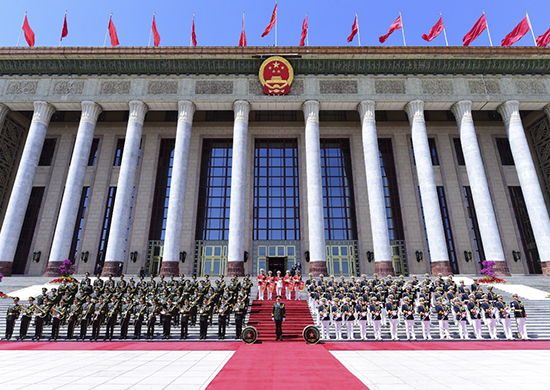
- The combined PLA Band at the Great Hall of the People with the regular ceremonial band to the left, the National Marching Band to the right and the state fanfare trumpeters in the middle.
- Active: 1952 - present
- Country: China
- Allegiance: Chinese Communist Party
- Branch: People's Liberation Army
- Type: Military Band
- Size: 400+
- Part of: Political Work Department of the Central Military Commission
- Garrison/HQ: Music Hall of the PLA, Haidian District, Beijing, China
- Nickname: The PLA Band
- March: Military Anthem of the People's Liberation Army

Commanders
- Director of Music: Colonel Commandant Zhang Haifeng
- Bandmaster and Band Drum Major: Liu Xinbo

Insignia
- Shoulder Patch

The Central Military Band of People's Liberation Army of China (Chinese: 中国人民解放军军乐团) is a military music unit made for state ceremonies carried out by the People's Liberation Army of China. For more than 70 years, the band has acted as the musical branch of the PLA. The musicians of the orchestra are required to play ceremonial music for visiting heads of state and government, as well as perform during national events such as the National Day of the People's Republic of China and PLA Day. The band is currently led by Colonel Commandant Zhang Haifeng, who has been in the band since 1988.

== History ==
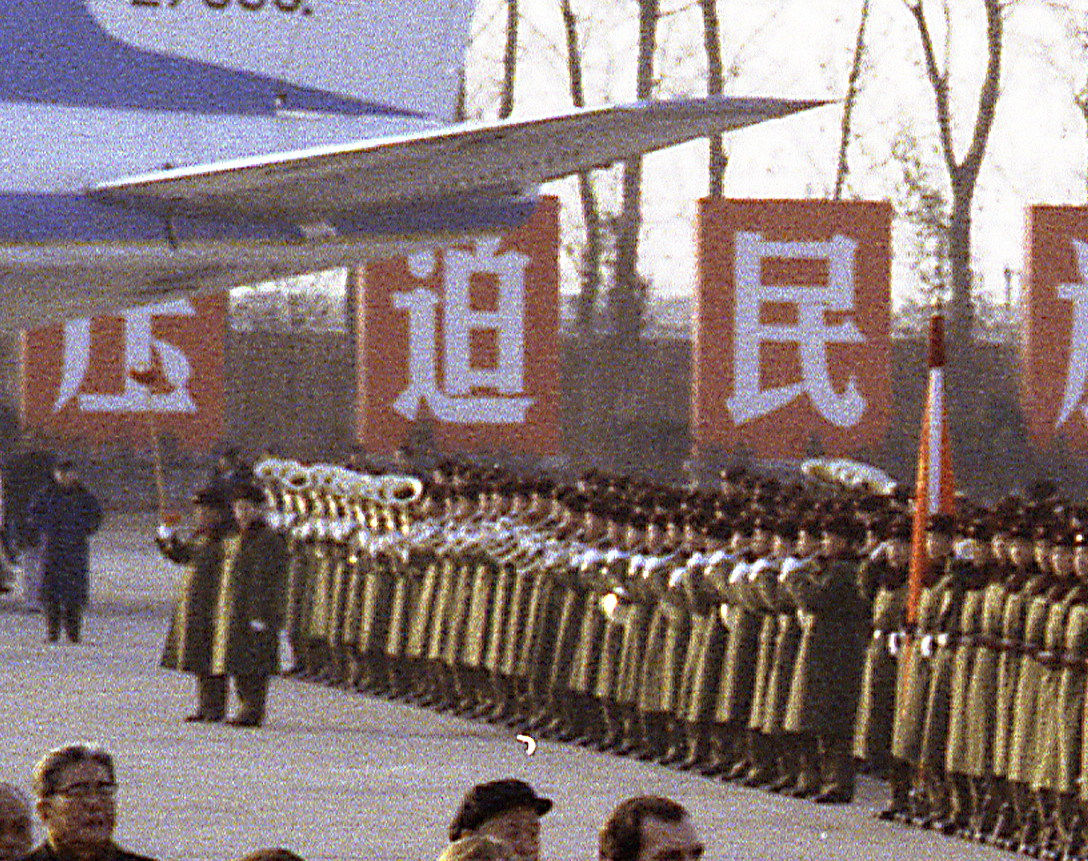
The band in 1975.

In August 1949, the North China Military Band was founded with 200 members in Beiyuan under the North China Military Region. On October 1, 1949, at the proclamation ceremony of the PRC, the military band played in its debut appearance to a huge crowd in Tiananmen Square, playing for the first time the National Anthem (March of the Volunteers), and as the musical accompaniment for the first military parade in the PRC's history. Since 1950 it has played in all National Day Parades and in major national events, first as the Headquarters Band of the Beijing Capital Garrison (since 1952) and later on as the Central Band of the Beijing Military Region and today as the Central Military Band of the People's Liberation Army of China. It is a vital part of the Beijing Capital Garrison and the PLA General Headquarters, but also performs in events around the PRC and in events overseas.

In 1959, as part of the 10th anniversary of the People's Republic of China, the massed bands (of which the central band was among) consisting of one thousand musicians wearing olive-green uniforms opened the ceremony with the song The East is Red, which was timed to the arrival of Chairman Mao Zedong and Soviet Premier Nikita Khrushchev at 09.45 on the grandstand. As of 2012, the Chinese People's Liberation Army Central Military Band has successively performed at 14 National Day military parades since the founding of the People's Republic of China and the 2015 China Victory Day Parade as part of a 1,000+ joint-military band contingent which was first conceived by Mao in 1950. It has also had the honor of playing at social events such as during the 1990 Asian Games, 2008 Beijing Olympic Games, the National People's Congress opening ceremony, the Shanghai World Expo as well as visits of heads of state and heads of government. In the 2000s, the band moved into the Music Hall of the People's Liberation Army on Changzhi Road in Beijing's Haidian District. On 30 May and 1 July 2011, in order to celebrate the 14th anniversary of the reunification of Hong Kong, the band made its first performance at the Queen Elizabeth Stadium with the Hong Kong Police Band and held a large-scale symphony orchestra concert there. In October 2012, the United States Army Band took part in a goodwill tour of China with the PLA Band titled Friendship and Cooperation Through Music. This was a follow-up after the band visited the United States the previous year to perform with TUSAB at the United Nations. In January 2016, the Central Band was transformed to its current status as a directly reporting unit of the then newly established Political Work Department of the Central Military Commission from the PLA General Political Department.

It is the flagship and most senior band of all the bands within the entire People's Liberation Army, and the centerpiece of the wider service branch and unit military bands in the PLA, all of which fall under the direct supervision of the Political Work Department, Central Military Commission.

== PLA National Marching Band ==
The PLA National Marching Band is a 61-member marching band unit of the Central Band of the PLA. It is very similar in nature and instrumentation to the United States Marine Drum and Bugle Corps, but it is more of a military corps style band that also uses woodwinds. The Bandmaster and Band Drum Major of the marching band is Liu Xinbo. The NMB also provides field drummers and state fanfare trumpeters during state visits, ceremonies of state and major parades in the capital.

The Marching Band has toured multiple countries for tours and performances. Some of those countries include:

- Russia
- Kazakhstan
- North Korea
- Vietnam
- France
- Germany
- United Kingdom
- United States
- Finland
- Australia

== Uniform ==
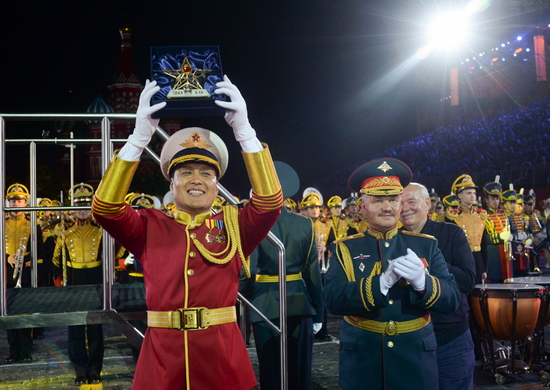
The band conductor, Senior Colonel Liu Xinbo, receiving an award with Russian Major General Timofey Mayakin at the Spasskaya Tower Military Music Festival and Tattoo in 2019.

The Type 07, being the principal uniform of the PLA, is the official uniform of the band. The first unique uniform design for the band came with the Type 87 uniform, in which the band gained epaulettes among other things. In early August 2014, the band debuted a new uniform for their new National Marching Band in front of visiting Uzbek President Islam Karimov, a move which was praised by observers. The new uniform consists of white trousers and a white peaked cap as well as red closed collar tunic. The uniform also had with a blue variant which drew comparisons with the United States Marine Corps and the Royal Marines.

== Military Repertoire ==
- March of the Volunteers (National Anthem of the People's Republic of China) (义勇军进行曲)
- Military Anthem of the People's Liberation Army (中国人民解放军进行曲)
- Troops Review March of the PLA (Inspection March of the PLA) (检阅进行曲)
- Parade March of the People's Liberation Army (分列式进行曲)
- Welcome March (欢迎进行曲)
- East Is Red (東方紅)
- Ode to the Motherland (歌唱祖國)
- Song of the Military and Political University of Resistance Against Japan (抗日军政大学校歌)
- I Love the Motherland's Blue Skies (我爱祖国的蓝天)
- Funeral March
- Flower Song

In March 2015, Yue Hai, the then-conductor of the PLA Band, described the playing of the national anthem at settings such as weddings and funerals as "blasphemy" and suggested that the national government put more regulations on the anthem in an interview with the Huashang Bao newspaper.

== List of leaders ==
Directors of Music:

- Luo Lang (1948—?)
- Wang Jianzhong (?)
- Shi Lei (?)
- Ma Guoping (?)
- Liu Yubao (?—1989)
- Lu Shuzhong
- Qi Jingquan
- Yu Hai (March 2003-July 2010)
- Zou Rui (2011–2018)
- Zhang Haifeng (2018–2021)

Political Commissars:

- Yin Zhengyi (1982–1986)
- Liu Qilin (?)
- Chen Zhenyan (?)
- Li Yonglong (2004–2008)
- Ma Li (2008–2012)
- Wang Qiang (2012-Present)

== PLA Band Museum ==
The Chinese Military Music Hall was officially completed in July 2012. On July 10, 2012, the PLA Band celebrated the 60th anniversary of its foundation, and the celebration was held in the newly completed hall.

== Gallery ==
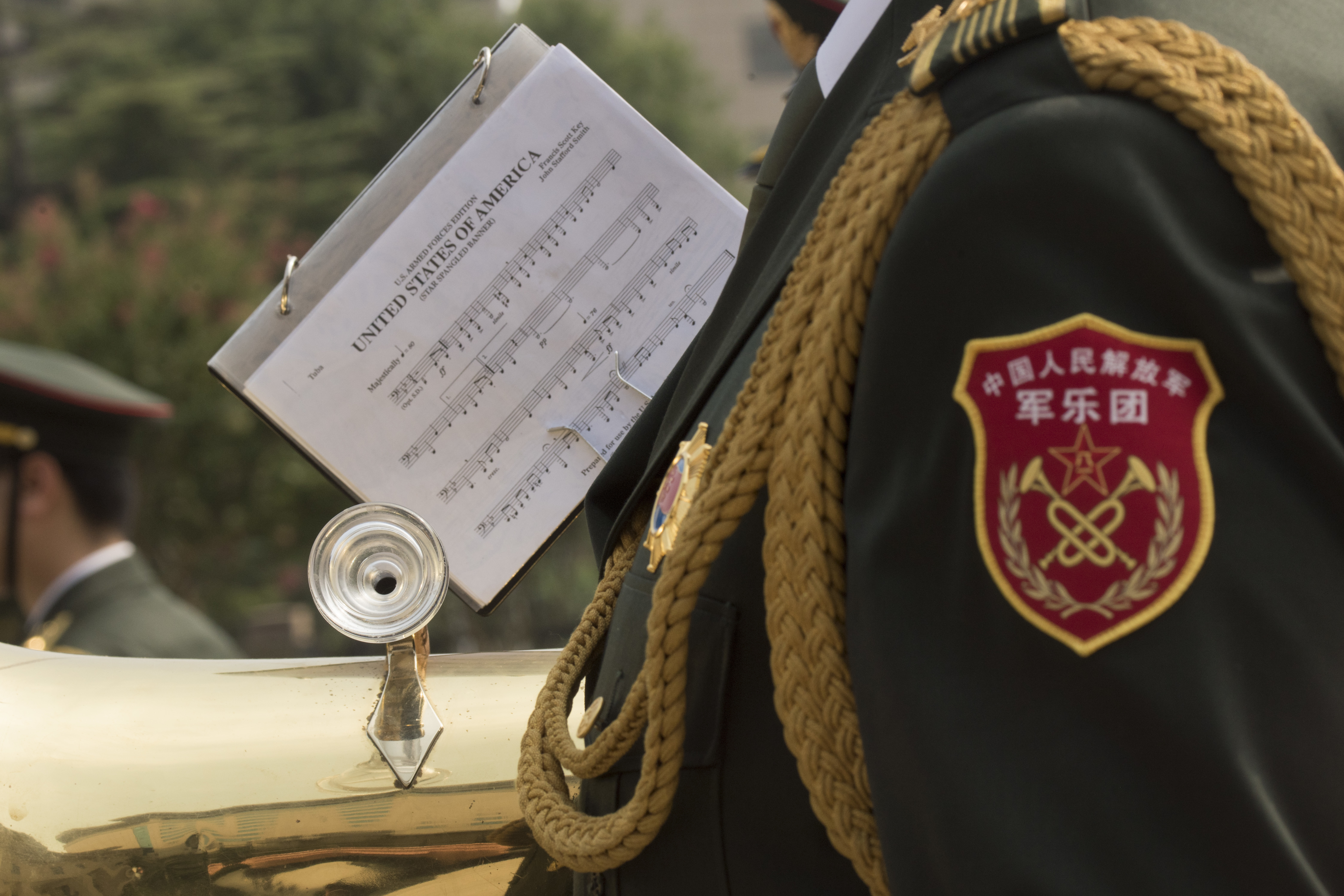
Ceremonial photo of musician with the sheet music to the Star Spangled Banner

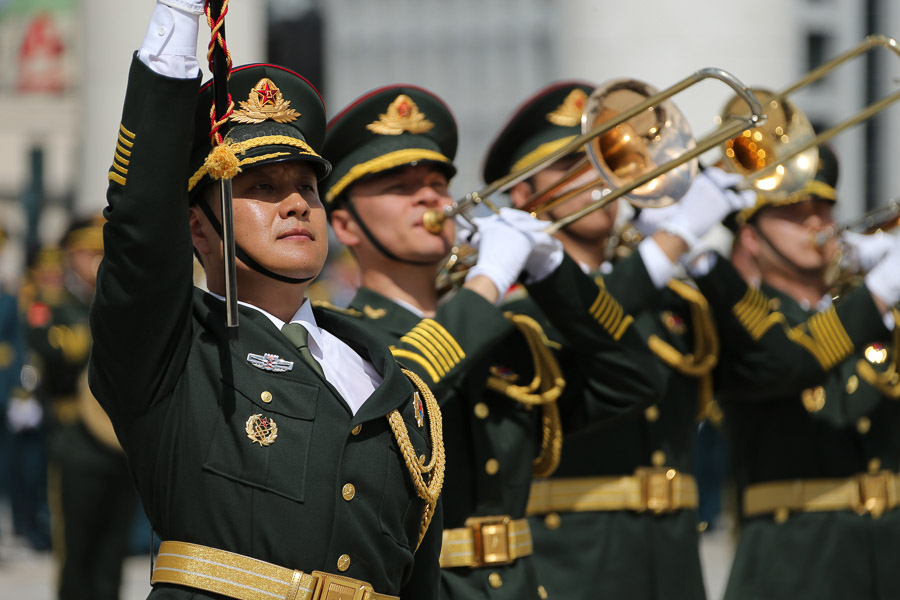
Trumpet of Peace 2016

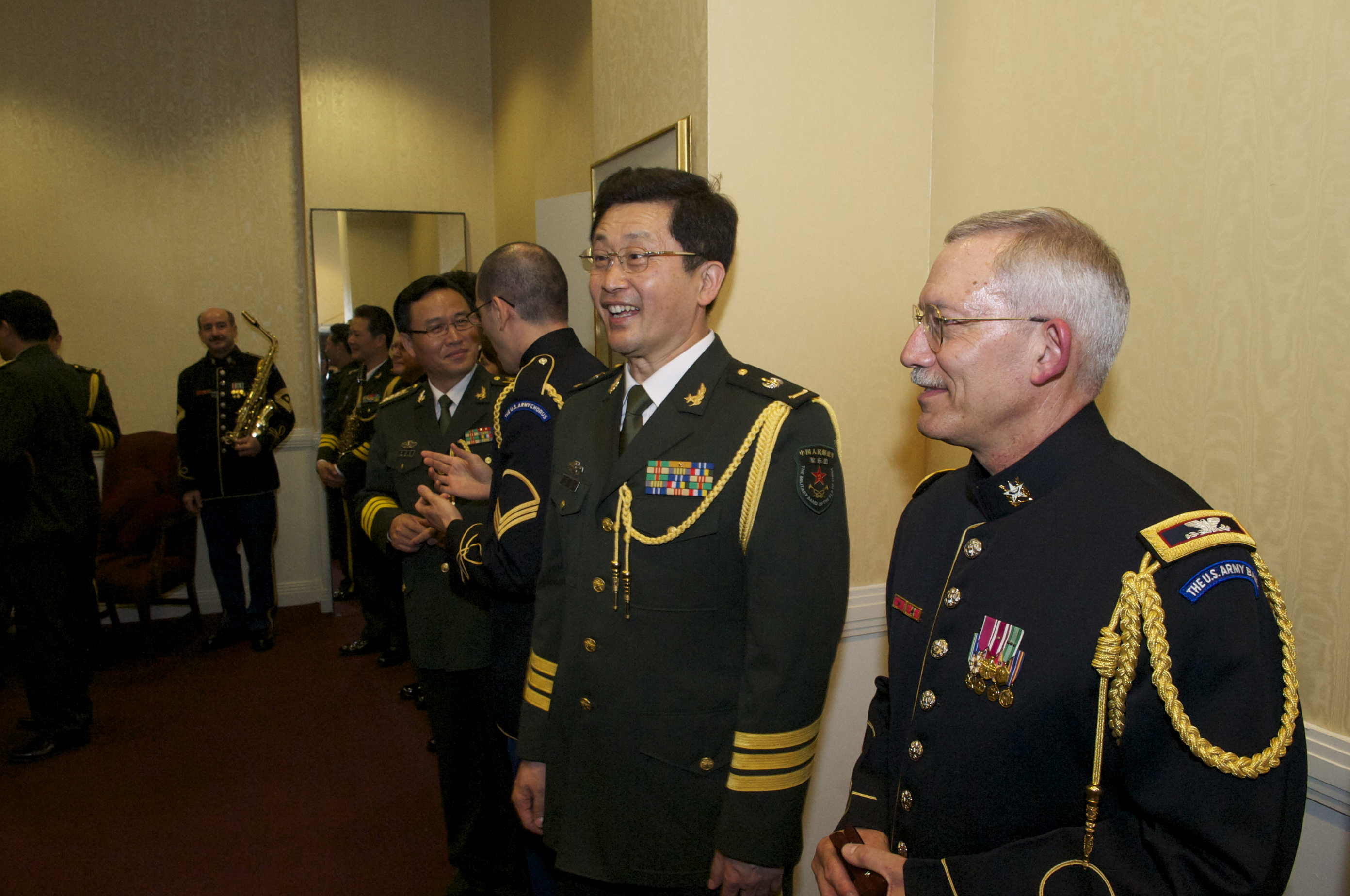
Yu Hai (in the middle), served as the fourth commander of the band.

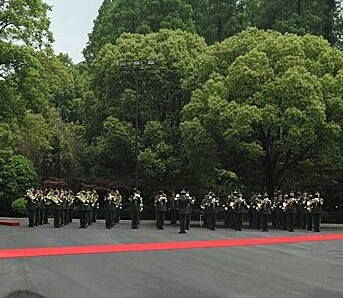
The PLA Honor Guard Band.

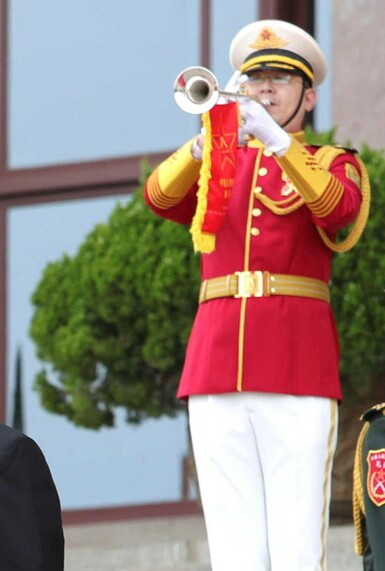
A state fanfare trumpeter of the Marching Band.

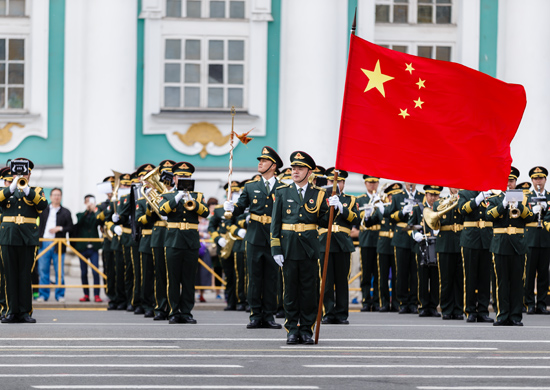
The band in St. Petersburg.

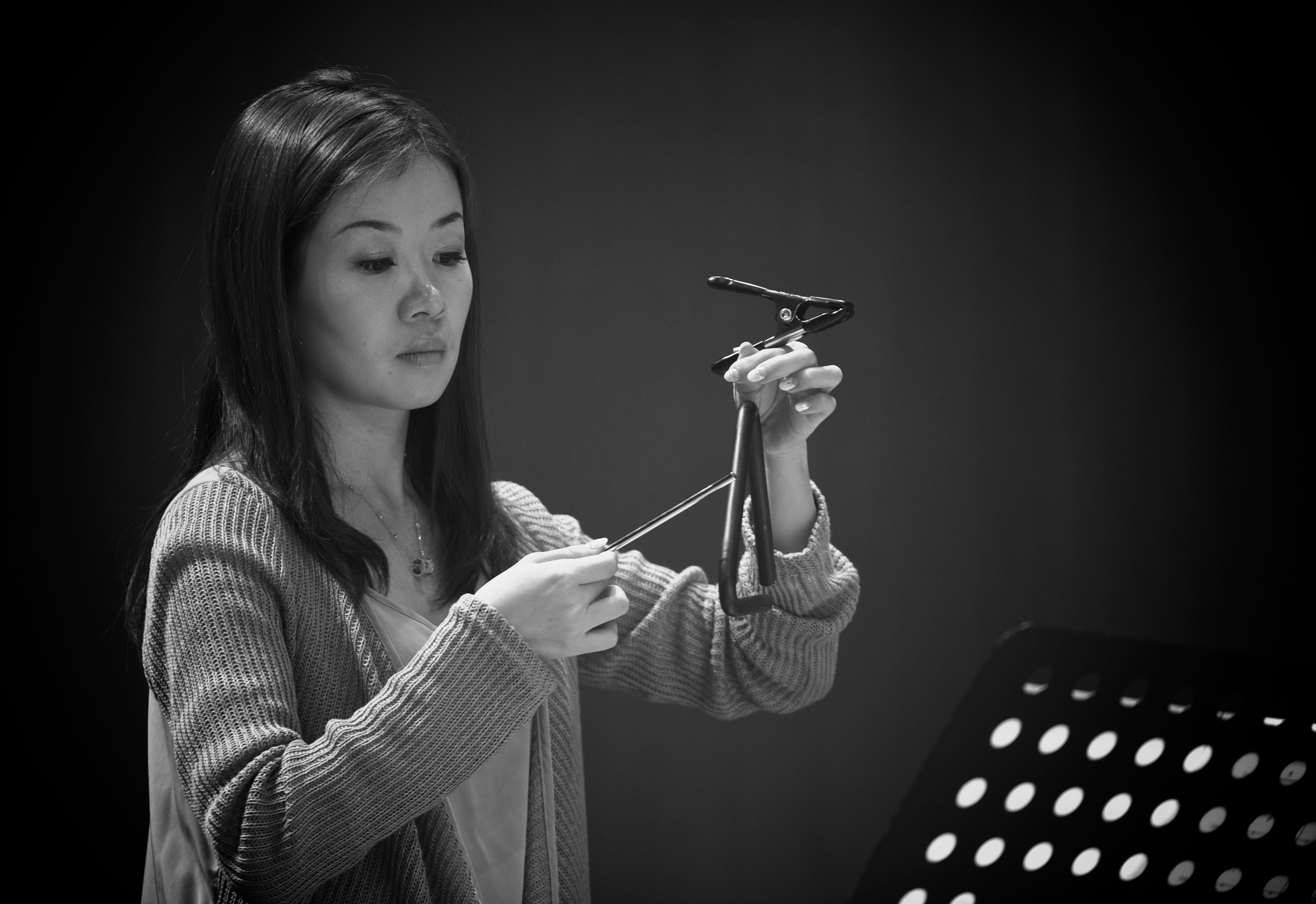
A female percussionist who was also the first female to be employed by the band.

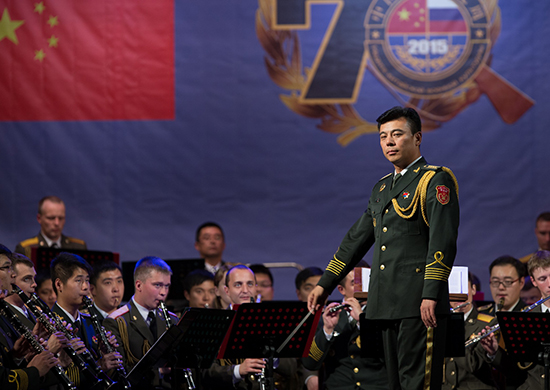
Band director Zhang Haifeng conducting a group of musicians in the Military Band of the Western Military District.

== See also ==
- People's Liberation Army Navy Band
- Hong Kong Police Band
- People's Armed Police Band
- Beijing Garrison Honor Guard Battalion
- Republic of China Army Band
