= Chinese National Day Parade =

Military parade held in Beijing, China

National Day of the People's Republic of China Parade 中华人民共和国国庆阅兵
- Flag of the People's Republic of China
- Genre: Military parade, mass pageant, music and dance gala
- Date: 1 October
- Frequency: Select years (Note: Since the founding of the people's republic to 2009, the country has held 15 National Day grand military parades in 1949–1959, 1984, 1999, 2009 and 2019.)
- Locations: Chang'an Avenue, Tiananmen Square, Beijing
- Coordinates: 39°54′26.4″N 116°23′27.9″E
- Years active: 77
- Inaugurated: 1 October 1949
- Participants: Party and state leaders, international organization leaders, PLA, PAP, Militia, and other formations
- Leader: General Secretary of the Chinese Communist Party; Chairman of the Central Military Commission
- Organiser: Chinese Communist Party; Central Military Commission
- Website: 70prc.cn (English version)

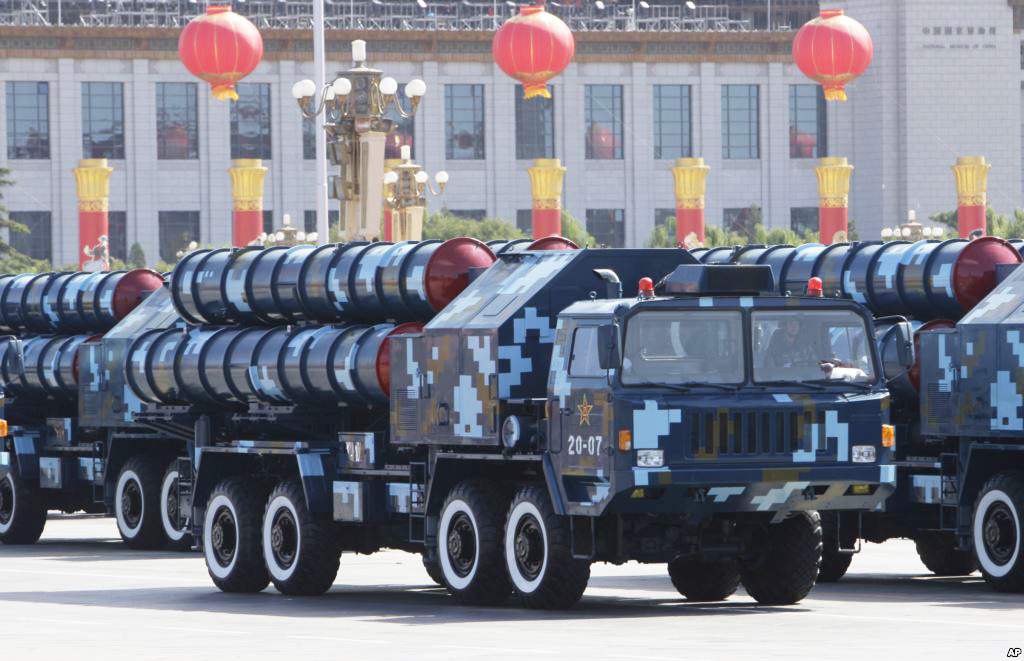
An HQ-9 at China's 60th anniversary parade.

The National Day Parade (Chinese: 国庆阅兵), officially the National Day of the People's Republic of China Parade (Chinese: 中华人民共和国国庆阅兵), is a civil-military parade event held at Tiananmen Square in Beijing, the capital of the People's Republic of China, on the National Day of the People's Republic of China on 1 October. It is organized by the People's Liberation Army, the People's Armed Police and the Militia, as well as civilian groups of the Chinese Communist Party (CCP). It has been held every ten years since 1959, previously held annually from 1950 to 1959; it has been broadcast live on China Central Television since 1984.

The most recent National Day parade took place on October 1, 2019, on the 70th anniversary of the People's Republic of China.

== Overview ==
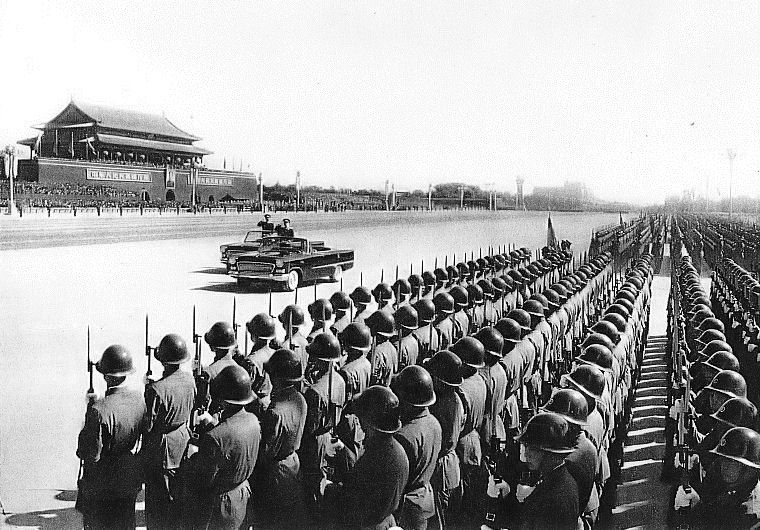
Marshal Lin Biao surveying the soldiers during the 10th anniversary military parade in 1959.

Since the parade of 1950, parades have been held on the city's Tiananmen Square to mark the anniversary of the official foundation of the PRC. These are now held every 10th year, a format which began in 1999 to mark the golden jubilee anniversary of nationhood. Formerly there were yearly parades held until 1959 when the CCP decided that the holiday would be celebrated "with frugality". Parades were also held in 1964, 1966, 1969, 1970 and 1984.

The parade is presided by the paramount leader in his political duty as General Secretary of the Chinese Communist Party and constitutional mandate as the supreme commander of the PLA and chairman of the Central Military Commission, since 1984. He has also inspected the parade in person. The parade commander is a general officer of the PLA with the rank of Lieutenant General or Major General, with the position of commander of the Central Theater Command or as a high-ranking member of the CMC's present 15 departments. Until 1959, during the years that the parade was held in a nationalized form of the Soviet tradition, the parade was inspected by the Minister of National Defense, a high-ranking billet occupied by either a General or (before 1984) a Marshal (before 1954 the Commander in Chief of the PLA). The event's master of ceremonies has either been the Party Committee Secretary of Beijing or a high-ranking member of the Central Committee, CCP.

== Parade events ==
=== Opening of the parade ===
At 10 a.m. the massed military bands of the People's Liberation Army sound the Welcome March, signifying the official commencement of the ceremony. As the CCP General Secretary (paramount leader) arrives, he is joined by the following on the rostrum on the Tiananmen Gate:

- Premier of the State Council of the PRC
- Chairmen of both the Standing Committees of the National People's Congress and the Chinese People's Political Consultative Conference
- High-ranking officials of the Politburo Standing Committee and the other departments under the Central Committee, CCP
- Vice President of the PRC
- Vice Premiers of the State Council of the PRC
- Vice Chairmen of the Central Military Commission and members of the departments of the Commission
- Chief Justice of the Supreme People's Court
- Prosecutor General of the Supreme People's Procuratorate
- State Councilors
- Vice Chairmen of the Standing Committee of the NPC and the National Committee of the CPPCC
- Secretaries of the Secretariat of the Chinese Communist Party
- Retired leaders of the party and the Republic
- Representatives of both the NPC and CPPCC, including party faction leaders and leaders of CPPCC organizational factions
- Ministers of the State Council and heads of national government agencies with ministerial status
- Members of the diplomatic corps and any foreign heads of state and/or governments present if any
- Representatives of the private sector, state-owned national and regional companies and people's organizations
- If available, provincial governors, city mayors and heads of the Party provincial and municipal committees and regional-level legislatures

In past parades a card stunt display was assembled at the square grounds made up of thousands of young men and women from the capital and from various parts of the country (abolished 2015), while student battalions of the Young Pioneers of China are assembled in the sides of the Massed Bands, led by the Senior Director of Music of the PLA Military Bands Service, made up of around 1,900 male and female bandsmen from the service branches from military bands stationed nationwide. The Pioneer Battalions carry the red battalion colours which can be seen in front of their respective contingents.

The flag raising ceremony follows the arrivals, but unlike the normal ceremony the color guard company, as a 21-gun salute is fired by the gunners of the State Honors Artillery Battery of the Beijing Garrison Command, marches off from the sides of the Monument to the People's Heroes, forms up, and takes its place at the center of the grounds nearest the Massed Bands, with the Flag of China now being placed into the flagpole by the color officer, who has just been given the color from the color guard. The segment was introduced in 1999 as a reenactment of sorts of the raising of the national flag in the square in 1949.

With that concluded and the card stunt now in position, the master of ceremonies gives the announcement on the microphone: Ladies and gentlemen, please stand for the raising of the national flag and the singing of the National Anthem! By then, the color officer now orders the salute and the massed bands play the National Anthem March of the Volunteers as the color company presents arms, after the anthem is played the color company orders arms and stands at ease.

=== Inspection of the parade ===
As the armed linemen of the Beijing Capital Garrison take their places, the paramount leader then descends to the grounds of the Tiananmen Gate via the elevator and rides on an open top Hongqi L5 for the inspection segment, with around 4,000 to 16,000 military personnel of the PLA, PAP and militia formations assembled by battalions, as well as the 9,000 strong personnel of the mobile column with around 400-900 vehicles. As he arrives at the front of the gate at the Chang'an Avenue, the parade commander (until 2017 the Commander of the Beijing Military Region and from 2017 the Central Theater Command) arrives in a similar limousine to inform the paramount leader of the commencement of the inspection of the parade.

The report done, the paramount leader, as the Massed bands play, then inspects the formations, each of its leaders ordering a salute as he passes by and the battalions each present arms (eyes right for unarmed formations and the port arms when using modern rifles), after which they stand at attention. Since 1984 the regular honor guard companies of the Beijing Garrison Honor Guard Battalion (since 2015 the final company is a women's company) together with its national colour guard unit are the first in line for the inspection segment of the parade.

Whenever the paramount leader passes by each of the battalions of the parade, each of them presents arms as the battalions' officers salute and the paramount leader will greet the soldiers by saying "Hello, comrades!" (同志们好!) or "[Thank you for your] hard work, comrades!" (同志们辛苦了!) The soldiers respond in kind in the eyes right saying "Hello, Mr. Chairman!" (主席好!) or "[We] serve the people!" (为人民服务!) and afterward, order arms (or currently, stand at ease, previously only by those unarmed battalions on parade).

Following the inspection, the paramount leader returns to the Tiananmen Gate to give the national keynote holiday address, at the same time the commander takes his place in the gate as well and the parade formations are now formed in review order as the mobile column now forms up and its crews make their way to their vehicles in addition to the flypast getting ready for its turn.

In the 2019 parade, the order was reversed, this time the paramount leader gives the opening keynote address before departing from the gate for the parade inspection.

=== Military parade proper ===
The order Commence the parade! from the parade commander atop Tiananmen Gate is the signal for the parade formation to march past the gate, wherein the dignitaries are gathered, while the crowds are assembled on the stands around the gate which include veterans of the PLA, Young Pioneers, representatives of state and private businesses and distinguished citizens as well as the civil service and the diplomatic corps and foreign press representatives. As the Massed Bands play the Parade March of the PLA, a special parade version of the Military Anthem of the People's Liberation Army, following the fly past of the national and party flags and the flag of the PLA, alongside, in special years, a helicopter formation honoring the number of years of nationhood, the ground column marches first as the General Secretary and other party, state and military leaders take the salute of each of the contingents marching past the saluting stand. Since 1984 the regular honor guard companies of the Beijing Garrison Honor Guard Battalion, including the aforementioned female company, are the first to march past the dignitaries, led by the colour guard carrying the flag of the PLA, which serves as the de facto national colour, alongside the national and party flags that both precede it. Each of the battalions that march past are made up of the following:

- Officers of the CMC, MND and the People's Armed Police
- National Defense University
- Military academies and officer cadet schools
- PLA Ground Forces
- PLA Navy
  - PLA Marine Corps
- PLA Air Force
  - PLA Airborne Corps
- PLA Special Operations Forces
- PLA Rocket Forces
- Joint Logistics Support Force
- Women's contingent of PLA personnel
- People's Armed Police
- PLA Reserve Service Forces
- China Militia of the CMC and NDMC
- Civilian workers of the CMC, PLA and MND
- Battalion of PLA personnel serving in UN peacekeeping operations

Until the parade of 1959, the PLA, PAP and militia marched separately during the parade proper (the militia marched as part of the civil column). Each of the battalions consists of 350 soldiers (14 rows of 25 soldiers) and are led by the battalion commander and the battalion political commissar, who march at the lead of their unit.

A mobile column then follows which is also formed into battalions, but with the command personnel mounted on their vehicles as they render honors. These are made up of the mostly nationally produced military vehicles and equipment in service and being introduced to serve the needs of the modern PLA. A notable unit to serve in the mobile column is the female contingent from the Bethune Medical College, which was introduced to the parade in 1984. Following this column, the flypast of aircraft from the Ground Forces, Navy and Air Force follows suit.

== List of National Day parades ==
The following parades have been held since 1949:

Parade Year	CMC Chairman/Paramount Leader	Parade Commander	Parade Inspector	Number of Participants	Notes
1949	Mao Zedong	Nie Rongzhen (Commander of the Northern China Military Region)	Zhu De (Commander-in-Chief of the PLA)	16,000	The Proclamation of the People's Republic of China took place right before the parade occurred.
1950	Mao Zedong	Nie Rongzhen	Zhu De	24,200	
1951	Mao Zedong	Nie Rongzhen	Zhu De	13,350	
1952	Mao Zedong	Nie Rongzhen	Zhu De	11,300	
1953	Mao Zedong	Nie Rongzhen	Zhu De	10,050	
1954	Mao Zedong	Yang Chengwu (Commander of the Beijing Military Region)	Peng Dehuai (Minister of National Defense)	10,400	The parade was attended by Soviet leader Nikita Khrushchev and North Korean leader Kim Il Sung. It was the last appearance for Chinese cavalry troops known as "China’s Cossacks".
1955	Mao Zedong	Yang Chengwu	Peng Dehuai	10,300	It was the shortest ever parade at only 50 minutes
1956	Mao Zedong	Yang Chengwu	Peng Dehuai	12,000	
1957	Mao Zedong	Yang Chengwu	Peng Dehuai	7,100	Indonesian President Sukarno and Nepalese Prime Minister Tanka Prasad Acharya were in attendance.
1958	Mao Zedong	Yang Chengwu	Peng Dehuai	10,000	
1959	Mao Zedong	Yang Yong (Commander of the Beijing Military Region)	Lin Biao (Minister of National Defense)	11,000	See 10th anniversary of the People's Republic of China
1984	Deng Xiaoping	Qin Jiwei (Commander of the Beijing Military Region)	Deng Xiaoping (Chairman of the Central Military Commission)	10,400	See 35th anniversary of the People's Republic of China
1999	Jiang Zemin	Li Xinliang (Commander of the Beijing Military Region)	Jiang Zemin (Chairman of the Central Military Commission)	11,000	See 50th anniversary of the People's Republic of China
2009	Hu Jintao	Fang Fenghui (Commander of the Beijing Military Region)	Hu Jintao (Chairman of the Central Military Commission)	11,000	See 60th anniversary of the People's Republic of China
2019	Xi Jinping	Yi Xiaoguang (Commander of the Central Theater Command)	Xi Jinping (Chairman of the Central Military Commission)	19,000 soldiers	See 70th anniversary of the People's Republic of China

=== Cancelled parades ===
- 1969 – Pushed through at last minute, but no mobile column and flypast, only civil-military parade column
- 1971 – Due to the Lin Biao incident
- 1979 – Due to the aftermath of the Cultural Revolution
- 1989 – Due to the 1989 Tiananmen Square protests and massacre

== Gallery ==
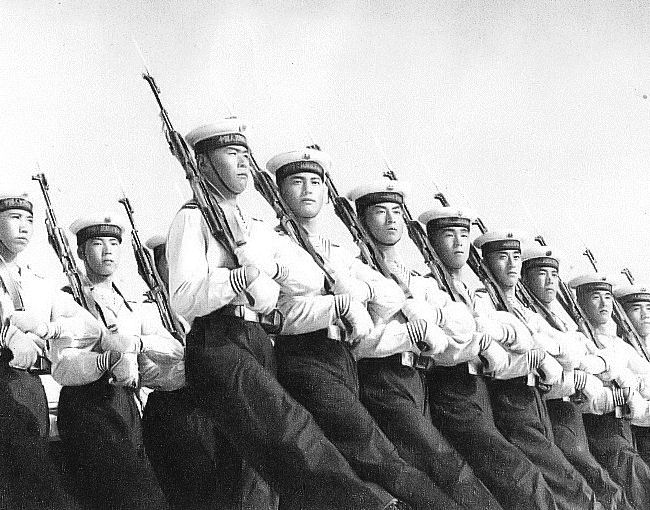
PLAN soldiers during the parade in 1959.

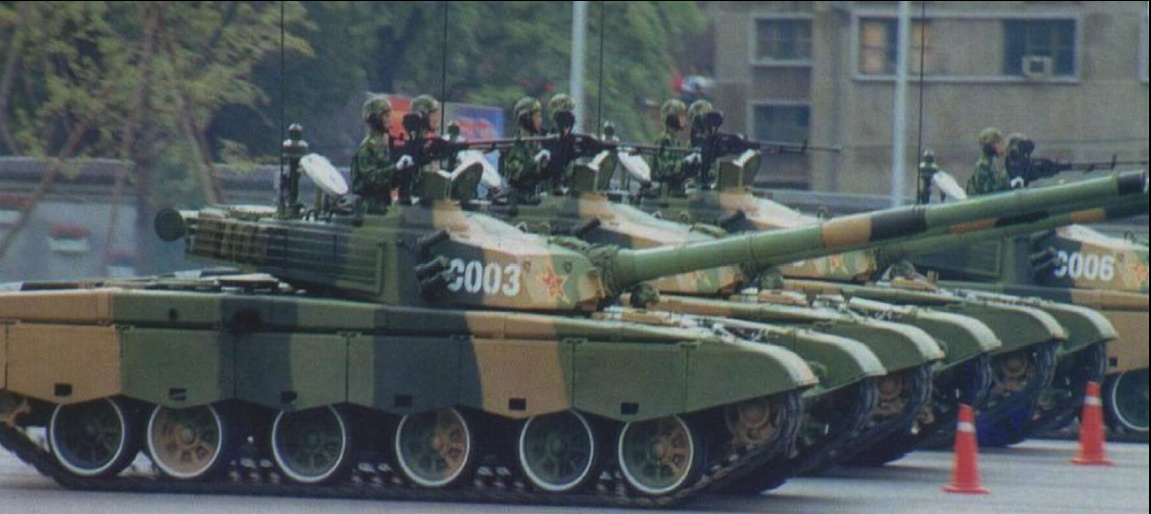
Type 98 tanks on parade.

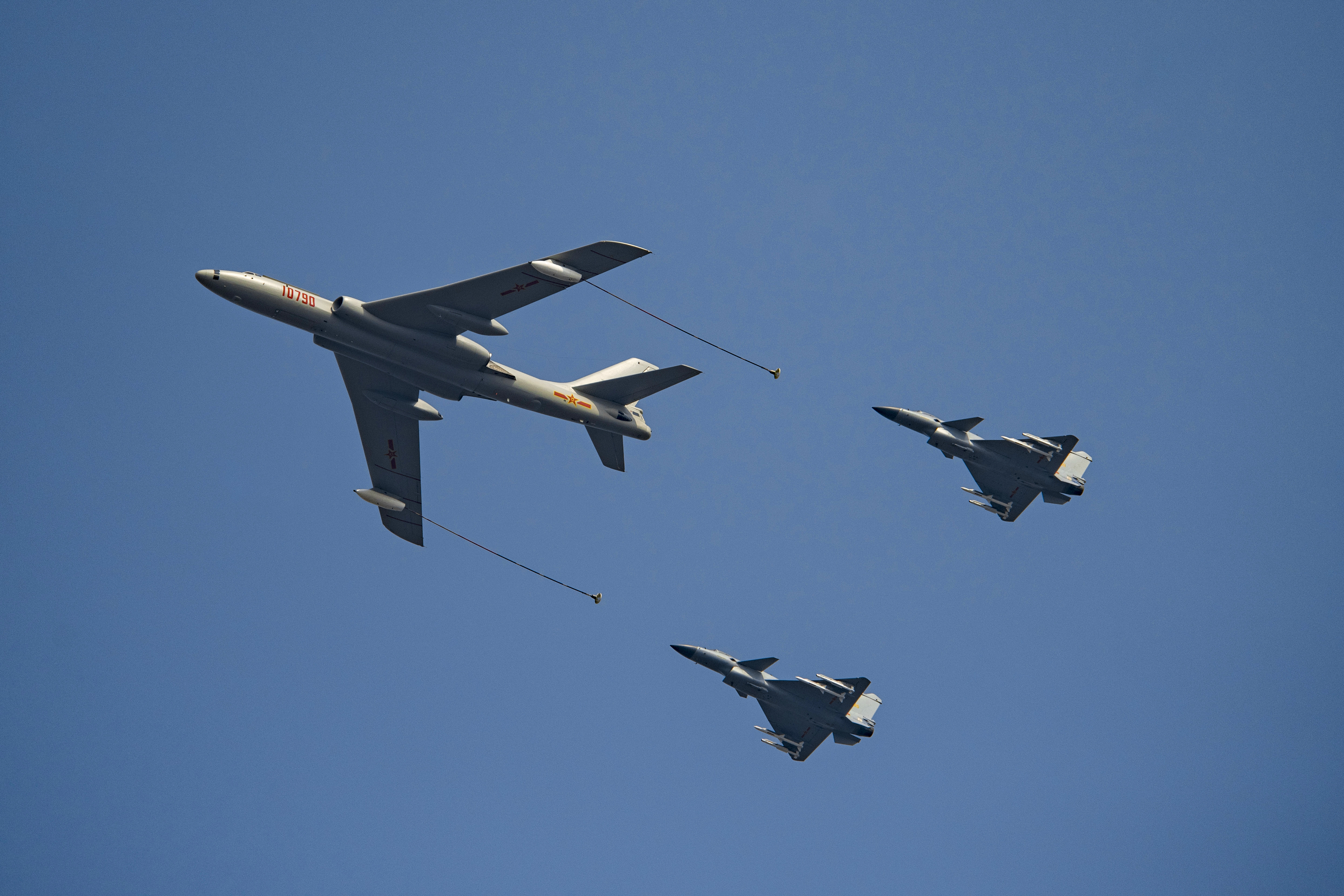
PLA aircraft at the 2019 National Day military parade.

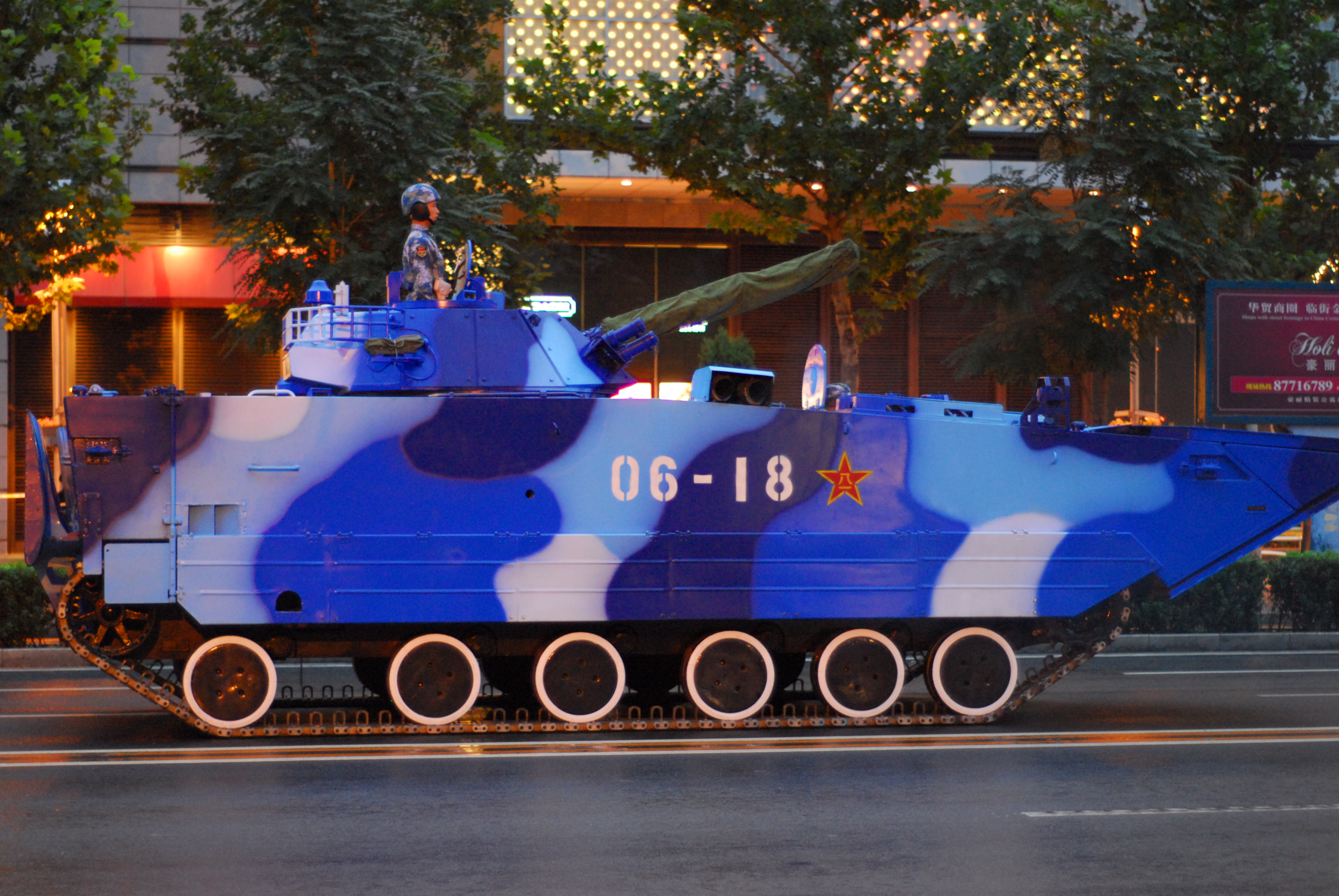
A ZBD-05 in Beijing, practicing for the parade.

The 2019 parade rehearsal video

== See also ==
- October Revolution Day
- Victory Day Parades
- Pakistan Day Parade
- Mongolian State Flag Day
- Indonesian National Armed Forces Day
