= People's Liberation Army Honor Guard Battalion =

PLA Honor Guard Battalion (1953 – 83) PLA Honor Guard Battalion, 1st Guard Division (1983 – present)
- 人民解放军警卫第一师仪仗大队
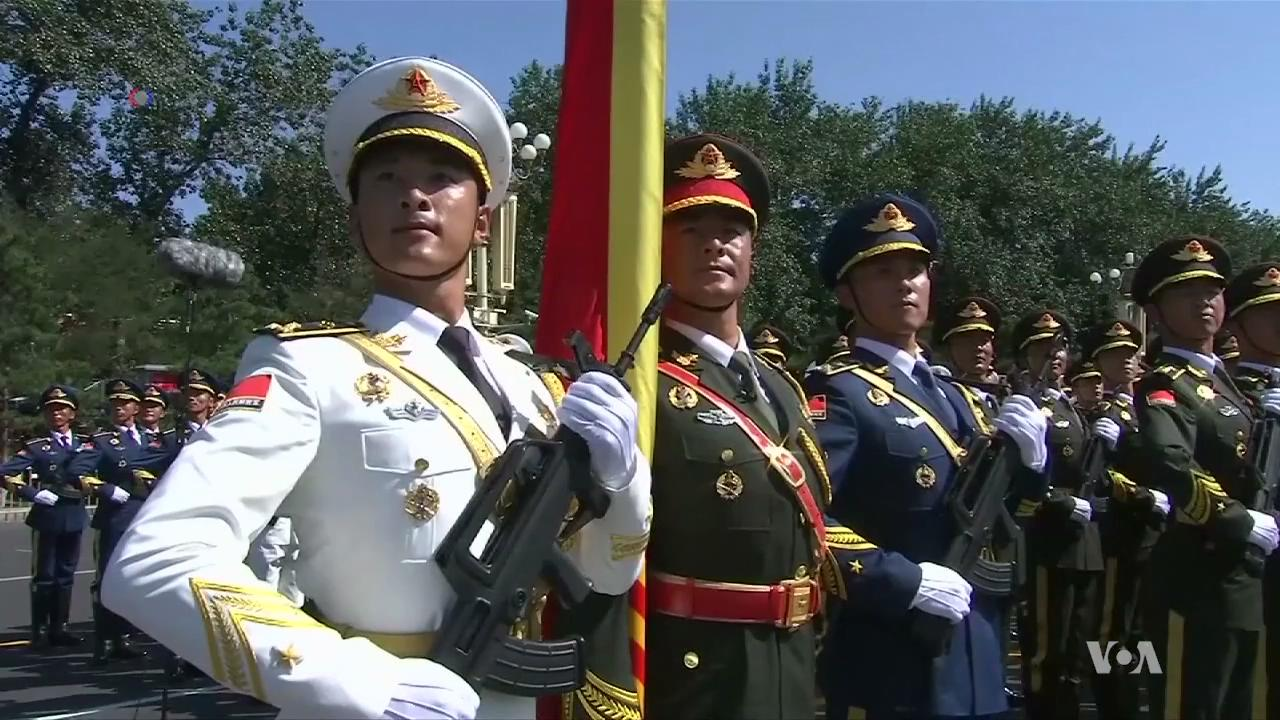
- 2015 China Victory Day Parade
- Active: 29 June 1953 – present
- Country: China
- Allegiance: Chinese Communist Party
- Branch: PLA Ground Force
- Type: Honour Guard
- Role: Public duties
- Size: 700+
- Part of: Central Theater Command; PLA Beijing Garrison; 1st Guard Division
- Garrison/HQ: Beijing
- Nickname: PLA Honour Guard
- Motto: I stand for the image of a great nation
- Colors: Red; Green
- March: Parade March of the People's Liberation Army
- Equipment: Type 56 rifle Type 95 rifle
- Decorations: 3rd Class Merit

Commanders
- Deputy Political Commissar for the Beijing Garrison: Major General Bao Zemin
- Commanding Officer: Senior Colonel Han Jie

Insignia
- PLA Honor Guard Shoulder Sleeve Insignia

The People's Liberation Army Honor Guard Battalion (Chinese: 中国人民解放军仪仗队营) is the official ceremonial honour guard and specialised unit of the People's Liberation Army (PLA). It is composed of representatives of the People's Liberation Army Ground Force, Navy, and Air Force. Male soldiers in the battalion must be at least 180 cm tall, while females must be at least 173 cm tall. This honor guard battalion, while reporting directly to the Central Military Commission, falls under the operational control of the Central Theater Command. During parades, the battalion is led by a color guard detail bearing the PLA flag, a tradition which began in 1981.

== History ==
=== Origins ===
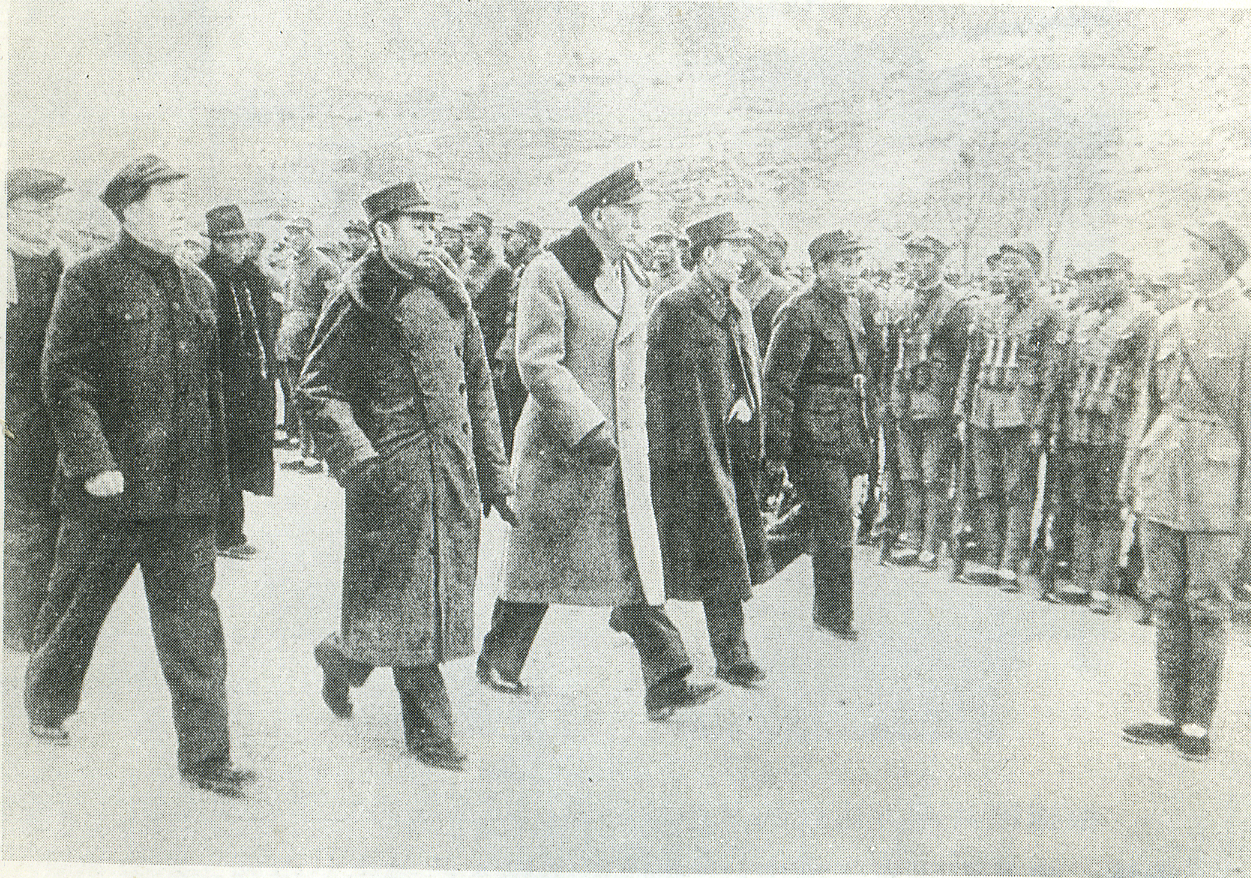
From left to right: Mao Zedong, Zhou Enlai, George Marshall, Zhang Zhizhong, and Zhu De inspecting the battalion in 1946

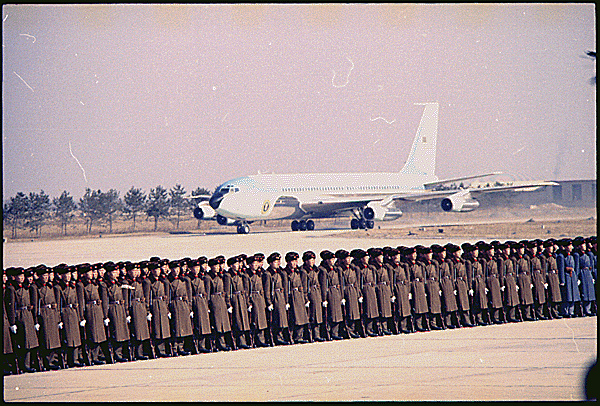
The enlarged honour guard in 1972.

In 1946, the first Chinese ceremonial unit was formed in Yan’an to welcome the visit of General George Marshall, the special envoy of US President Harry Truman. The 500-member honor guard was commissioned by Eighth Route Army Commander-in-Chief Zhu De and rehearsed the day before the visit at Yan'an Airport. The unit would later serve under the newly formed PRC as Mao Zedong's protocol unit for the presentation of credentials. On 16 October, 16 days after the Proclamation of the People's Republic of China, members of the unit provided honors to incoming Soviet ambassador Nikolai Roshchin. In June 1953, Premier Zhou Enlai ordered to create an official battalion on the unit's basis. Around that same time, the battalion was tasked with guarding the Korean War negotiations. In its early stages, it was based in Yilong Camp and only conducted small arrival ceremonies such as the one for Indonesian President Sukarno in 1956 and North Korean leader Kim il-Sung and Soviet Premier Nikita Khrushchev in 1959. In 1956, the battalion became a tri-service unit and in September 1957, Premier Zhou personally changed the report of the guard commander to: "Comrade [title of visiting leader], the Honor Guard of the Chinese People's Liberation Army has lined up for your inspection", which is still used today.

=== Increased presence ===
One of its first major state visits that the battalion was tasked with its presence was the Richard Nixon's 1972 visit to China, which set the precedent for PLA protocol on state visits. The battalion was given the responsibility in May 1977 to raise the national flag on Tiananmen Square. This was among its list of duties until December 1982. In September 1983, it was renamed to the Honor Guard of the 1st Guard Division of the People's Liberation Army. In January 1986, with the approval of the Beijing Military Region headquarters, the unit was renamed for the final time to its current name. On 2 March 1992, Jiang Zemin, Chairman of the Central Military Commission, signed an order to award the honorary title of the "Jiangsu Model of the Yilong Brigade" to the battalion. In December 2017, the BGHGB officially attached the Beijing Garrison Color Guard Company as part of the battalion, formerly under the People's Armed Police, which had been responsible for flag raising ceremonies for 35 years.

=== Female soldiers in the PLA Honor Guard ===
On May 13, 2015, 13 female Chinese soldiers who were added to the battalion made their debut during the welcoming ceremony for the President Gurbanguly Berdimuhamedov of Turkmenistan. Since then, female soldiers have stood shoulder to shoulder with their male counterparts in the battalion on state occasions and in parades. In June 2018, the battalion created a separate female detachment composed of 55 female honor guards from the PLA as a result of the reforms in the ceremony of military honours for foreign leaders. This detachment was first reviewed by Russian President Vladimir Putin, Kyrgyz President Sooronbay Jeenbekov, and Kazakh President Nursultan Nazarbayev, during their visits to the capital that month.

== Mission ==
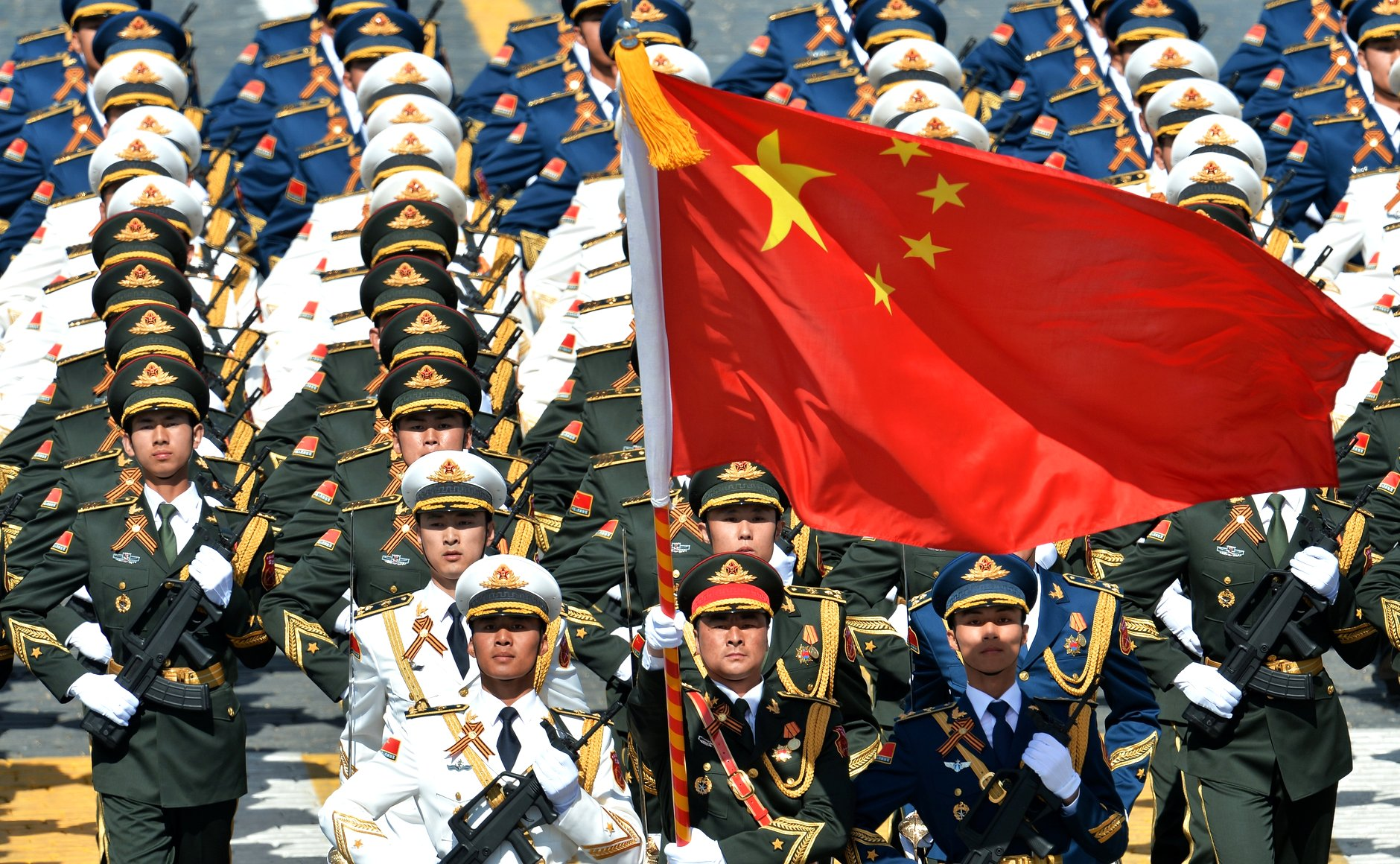
The battalion in the 2015 Moscow Victory Day Parade

Its missions include:

- Providing honours for high ranking national personalities and foreign dignitaries in their visits to the PRC (usually inside or at the forecourt of the Great Hall of the People in Beijing)
- Participate in wreath laying ceremonies
- Provide the color guard company for the national flag raising ceremonies at Tiananmen Square
- Providing guards of honour for state funerals of high-ranking officials of the Party and the Republic, deceased veterans of the PLA and active duty servicemen and women killed in action

=== Notable events and activities related to the mission ===
It performs the Changing of the Guard on Tiananmen Square and the raising of the Flag of China as well (from 1977-1982 and starting 2018). It has also performed at social events such as the 2008 Summer Olympics, 2008 Summer Paralympics, 2010 Asian Games, 2010 Asian Para Games, 2022 Winter Olympics, and the 2022 Winter Paralympics. Members of the BGHGB raised the Chinese national flag in Hong Kong in 1997 and in Macao in 1999. It also has since 1984, been the first unit to be inspected and parade on Tiananmen Square for the National Day of the People's Republic of China, having taken part in the 35th, 50th, 60th and 70th anniversaries of the PRC. They have also taken part in the 2015 China Victory Day Parade.

It also takes part in international obligations, such as the September 16 military parade in Mexico City in 2010 and 2013, the 2015 and 2020 Moscow Victory Day Parade as well as the 2015 and 2017 Pakistan Day parade. Moreover, it also has participated in the 2011 Caracas Independence Day Parade, the 2018-19 Minsk Independence Day Parade and the 2011 Festa della Repubblica Parade in Rome, Italy. During the Moscow parade, the contingent led by Li Bentao surprised hundreds of locals by singing the wartime Katyusha song during their march back to their living quarters during a nighttime rehearsal. In September 2015, the drill team of the battalion took part in the Spasskaya Tower Military Music Festival and Tattoo with the Central Military Band of the People's Liberation Army of China at the invitation of Lieutenant General Valery Khalilov, the Senior Director of Music of the Military Band Service of the Armed Forces of Russia.

In April 2001, Gabonese Defense Minister and future President of Gabon Ali Bongo was invited to visit China. After reviewing the honor guard upon arrival, he proposed to his Chinese counterpart Chi Haotian, that members of the battalion will go to Gabon to help set up and train professional ceremonial units in the Gabonese Armed Forces. In March 2003, after just under three years, the Ministry of National Defense agreed to Bongo's request and sent four officers led by Lieutenant Colonel Wang Yuanjing to Libreville by the end of November of that year, after which they stayed to train Gabonese troops for more than 6 months. This marked the first time that any member of the PLA Guard of Honor had trained a foreign ceremonial unit. It would later visit other countries such as the Democratic Republic of Congo, Rwanda, Mauritania and Qatar train their honor guards as well as active duty soldiers for parades. During the annual National Day parade in Qatar in 2017, the soldiers on parade adopted the Chinese marching style which was the result of the training by members of the battalion. Similarly, during the parade of the Rwanda Defence Force in honor of the 25th anniversary of the end of the Rwandan genocide, Chinese-trained RDF soldiers marched in a goosestep style for the first time as well as shouted commands in Mandarin to which the soldiers respond with "One! Two!", which is done similarly in the PLA honor guard.

=== In popular culture ===
Several news reports as well as films have been focused on the battalion, with some news stations including ABC having done reports on it. China's Ceremonial Soldiers (中国仪仗兵), a TV series premiered on CCTV in 2001 on National Day. The eight-episode series was directed by Zeng Xiaoxin and stars soldiers Yan Fan, Pan Yaowu and Li Bentao. The show focuses on the history and style of the honor guards in the PLA, as well as the tough training regimen of the guards for their ceremonial duties. The miniseries was co-produced by the Arts Department of the PLA and CCTV. In July 2016, the unit launched a special report called Telling Stories of Powerful Armed Forces on state television. The battalion often holds Media Days, during which journalists have access to its training quarters. During a media day in August 2011, Yang Caiwei of the Sanlih E-Television cable TV network in Taiwan described Media Days as "really a sign that the PLA is becoming more and more open".

== Salute Battery ==
The State Honors Salute Battery of the PLA (Chinese: 中国人民解放军陆海空三军仪仗队礼炮中队) is the battalion's ceremonial salute artillery battery, being the only salute unit in the PRC. In August 1949, at the preparatory meeting for the proclamation ceremony of the PRC, Chairman Mao proposed that a salute should be fired at the ceremony, which endorsed by the participants. According to international practice, the highest specification is a 21-gun salute, however, Mao proposed increase this to 28 as to commemorate the 28th anniversary of the birth of the Chinese Communist Party in 1949. After the meeting, Mao asked Tang Yongjian, director of the Training Division of the North China Military Region to draft a description of the sound of the salute. Tang quickly submitted the report to Mao who signed it immediately. Gao Cunxin, commander of the special forces of the North China Military Region was tasked with dispatching 108 mountain light guns from Zhangjiakou, which were mainly mountain cannons seized from the Imperial Japanese Army and were converted to the ceremonial role. The salute was later referred to as the "first generation salute". After the official announcement of the PRC occurred at the founding ceremony, the telephone command: "Salute!" was given to signal the firing of the gun salute. On 13 June 1961, President Sukarno visited China on a second trip, during which the guns were sounded once again during the welcoming ceremony held at the airport at the request of the Indonesian government. On 1 August 1963, the Yilu Camp Salute Company (formally known as the People's Liberation Army Salute Company) was formally established in Nanyuan and was given the task of acting as a salute battery by Premier Zhou Enlai. Shortly after the start of the Cultural Revolution, the gun salutes stopped occurring. This practice was revived in March 1984 by the People's Armed Police as a separate unit from the original PLA unit and in December 2017, the two units merged to become the artillery salute battery of the PLA, which reports to the BGHGB headquarters. Today, the battery is armed with the Type 60 122 mm field gun converted to the ceremonial role.

== Ceremonial uniform ==
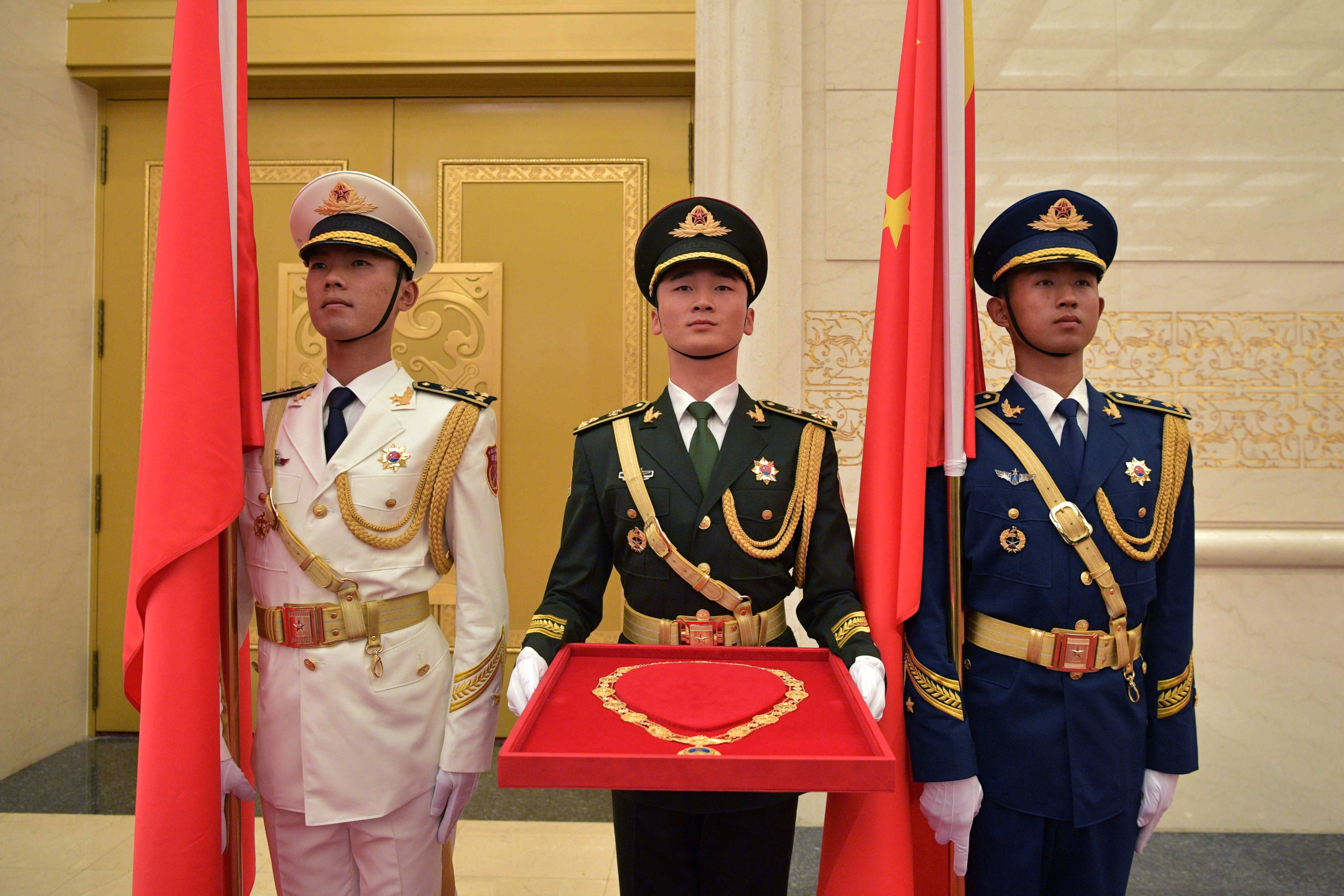
A tri-service honor guard in their distinctive Type 07 uniforms.

From its founding to 1955, the battalion did not have an official ceremonial uniform and just wore overcoats captured from the Japanese Army after World War II. From 1955, the battalion used Chinese made ceremonial uniforms for the first time. They would continue to use these uniforms until June 1, 1965, when they reverted to using regular infantry uniforms for the next 20 years. In 1987, Central Military Commission of China ordered a reform of army uniforms, ordering the battalion ceremonial uniforms once again, and on October 1, 1992, the battalion gained ceremonial sabres which it first used during the visit of President Nelson Mandela. Today, the unit utilizes the pan-PLA Type 07 uniform.

== Gallery ==
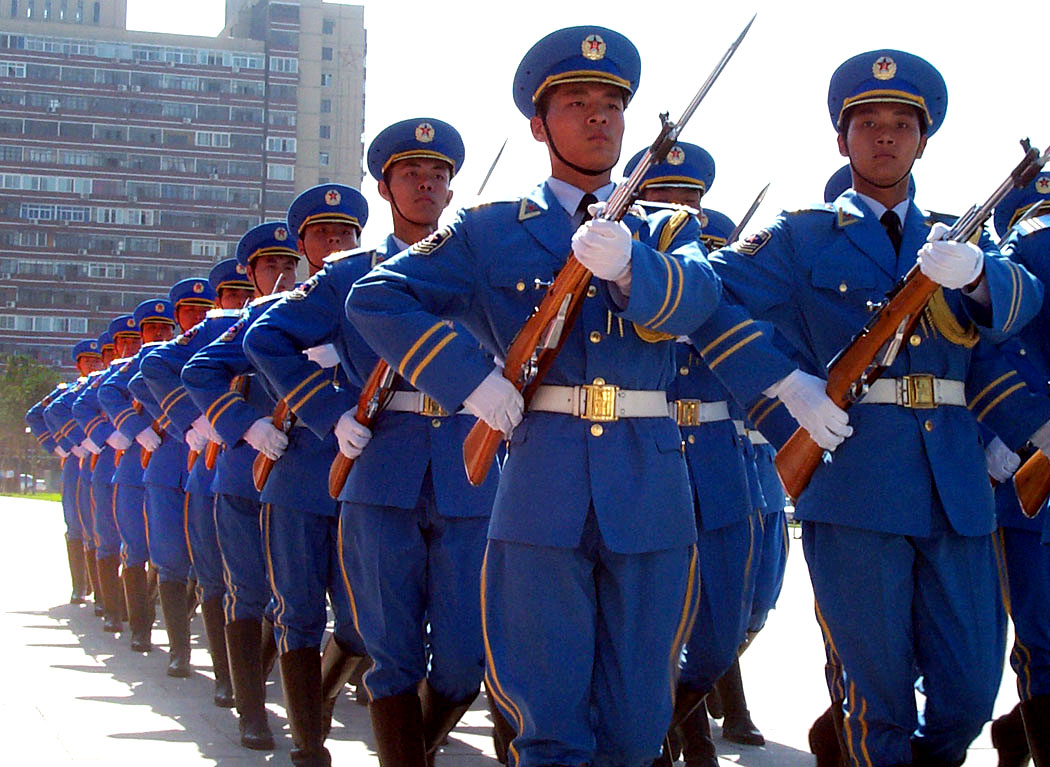
Airmen during an arrival ceremony

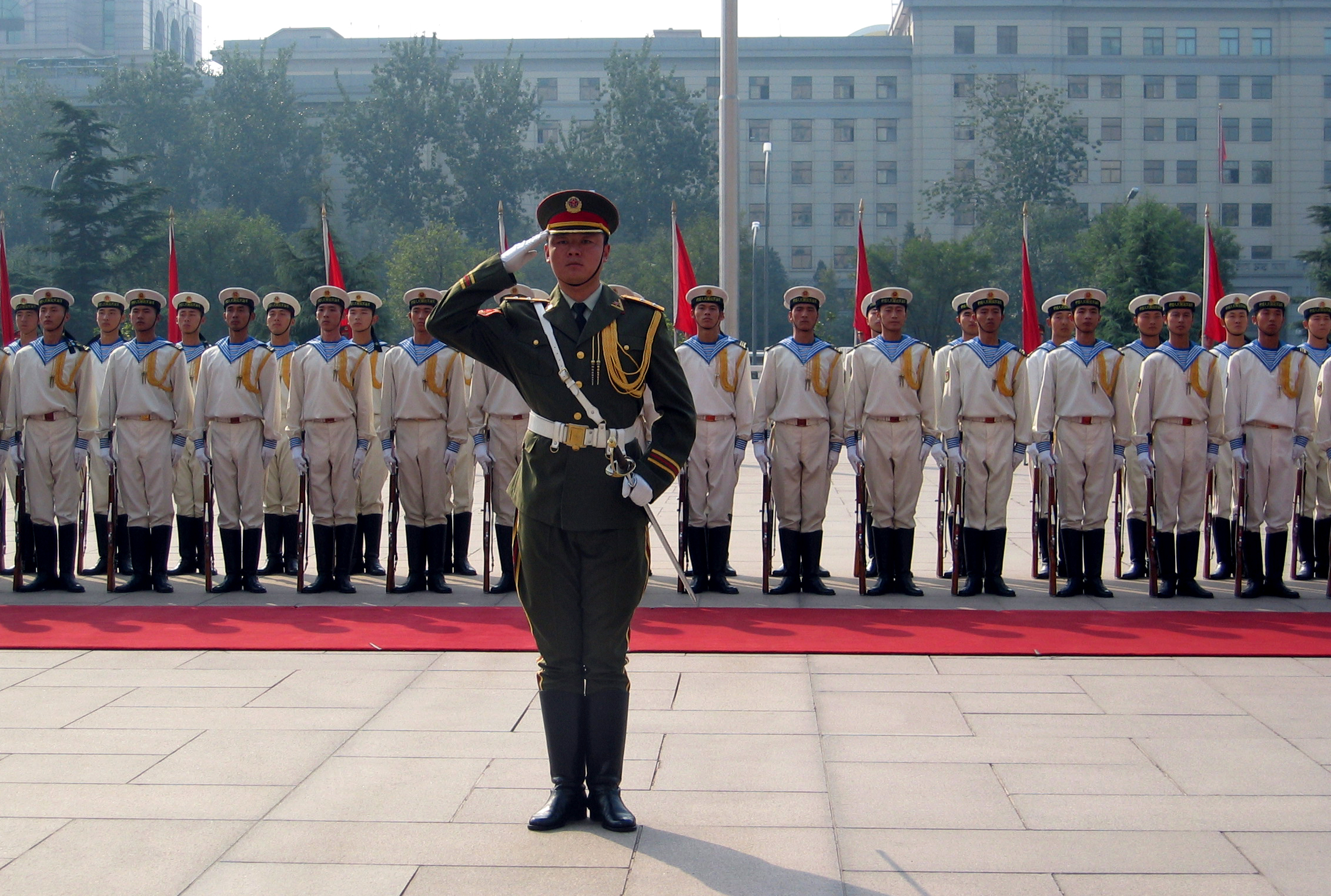
Sailors in the battalion as well as the commander stand at attention during US Secretary of Defense Donald H. Rumsfeld's visit to Beijing, October 2005.

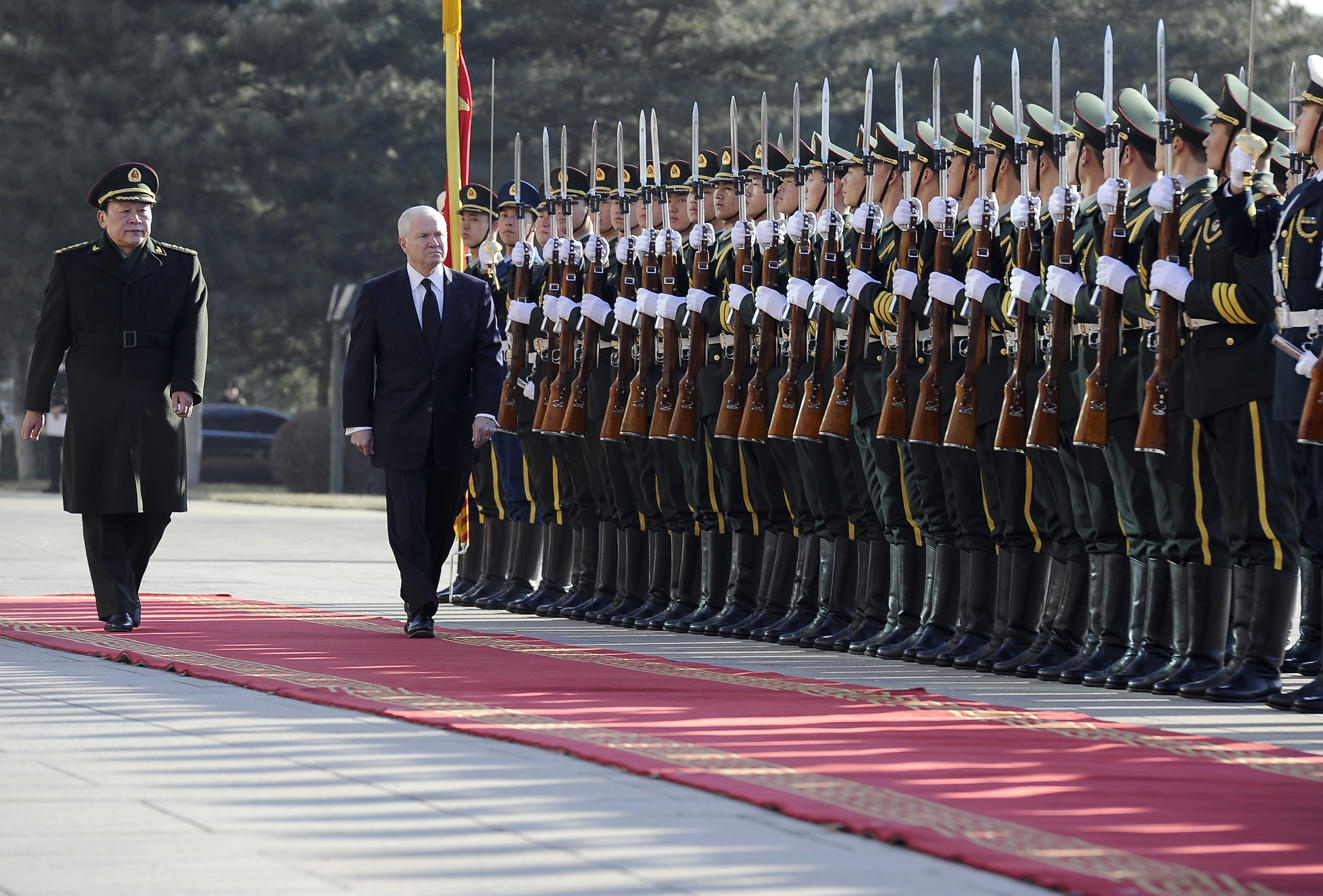
US Secretary of Defense Robert Gates inspecting the battalion at the Bayi Building, January 2011.

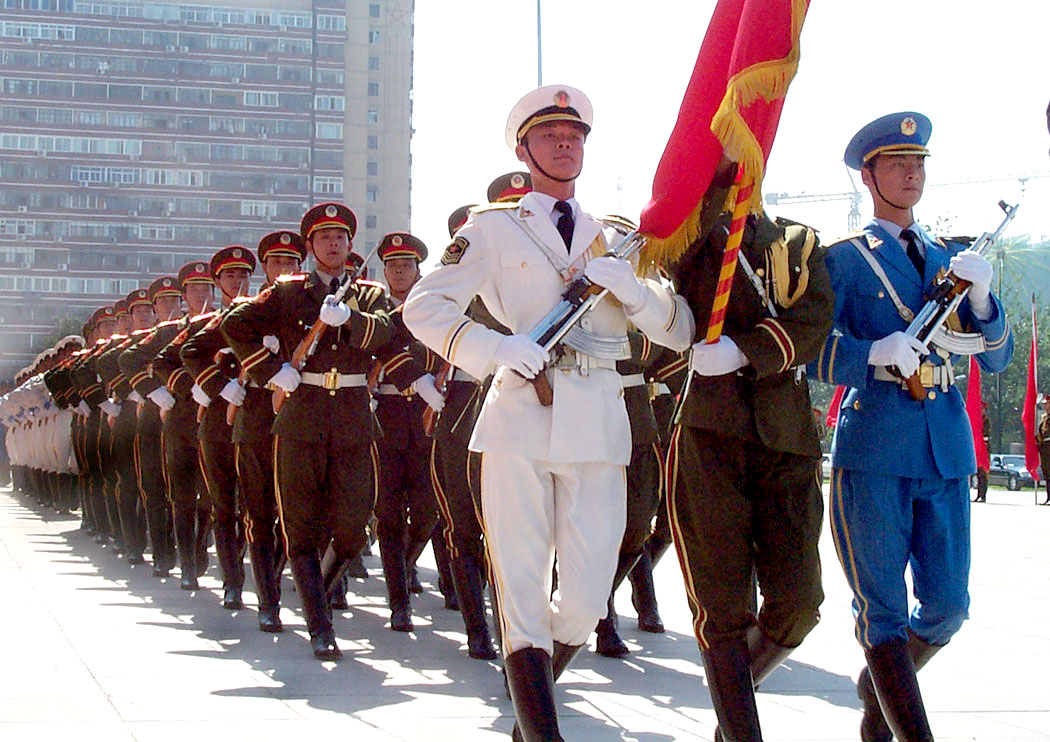
The tri-service color guard leading the battalion during a parade.

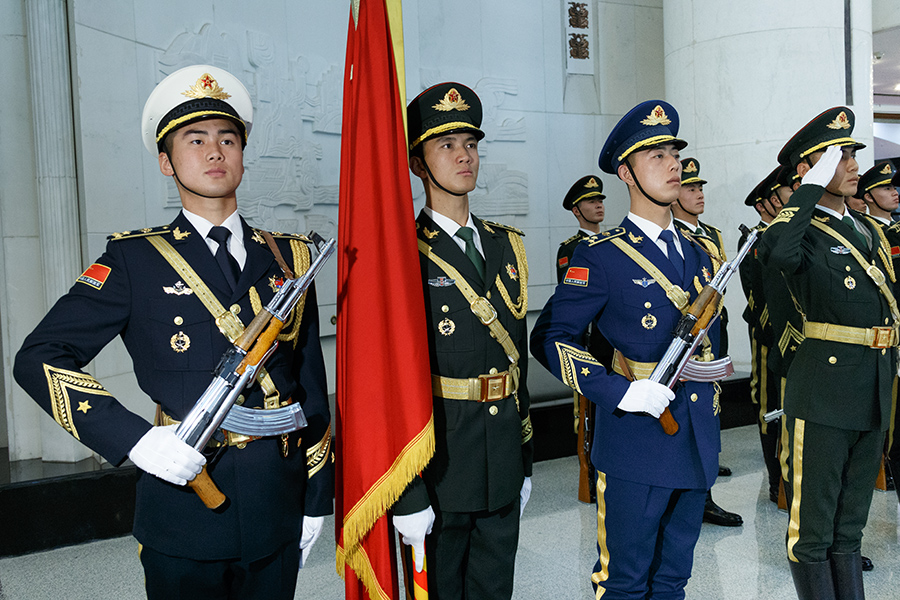
The color guard during the arrival ceremony for Russian Minister of Defense Sergey Shoigu, November 2016.

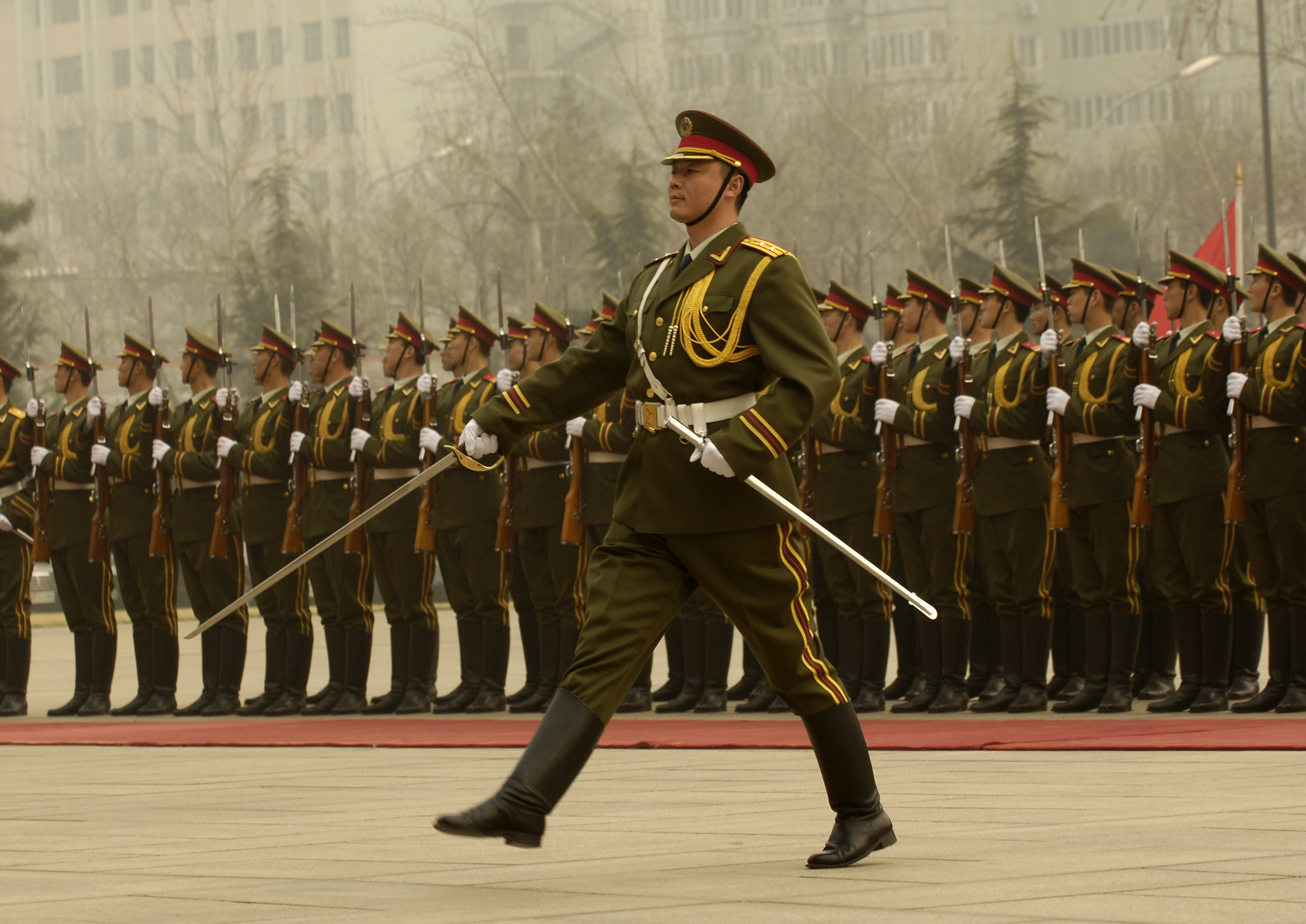
The commander of the honor guard salutes while marching to the saluting base where visiting US General Peter Pace will receive the welcoming report.

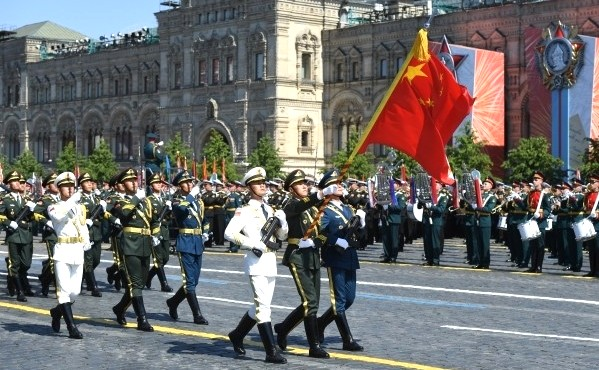
Soldiers of the battalion marching on Red Square, June 2020.

== See also ==
- Cuirassiers Regiment, Italy
- Grenadier Guards, United Kingdom
- Preobrazhensky Regiment, Russia
- Republican Guard, France
- The Old Guard, United States
- Wachbataillon, Germany
