= 70th anniversary of the People's Republic of China =

2019 celebrations in China

70th anniversary of the People's Republic of China 庆祝中华人民共和国成立70周年活动
- Genre: Military parade, mass pageant, music and dance gala
- Date: 1 October 2019
- Frequency: Select years (Note: Since the founding of the people's republic to 2009, the country has held 14 National Day grand military parades in 1949–1959, 1984, 1999, and 2009.)
- Locations: Chang'an Avenue, Tiananmen Square, Beijing, China
- Coordinates: 39°54′26.4″N 116°23′27.9″E
- Years active: 77
- Inaugurated: 1 October 1949
- Previous event: 60th anniversary of the People's Republic of China
- Next event: 80th anniversary of the People's Republic Of China
- Participants: National leaders, international organization leaders, PLA, PAP, Militia, and other formations
- General Secretary of the CCP: Xi Jinping
- People: Li Keqiang (Premier and host); Yi Xiaoguang (chief commander of the military parade)
- Website: 70prc.cn/english (archived)

Celebrations of the 70th anniversary of the founding of the People's Republic of China
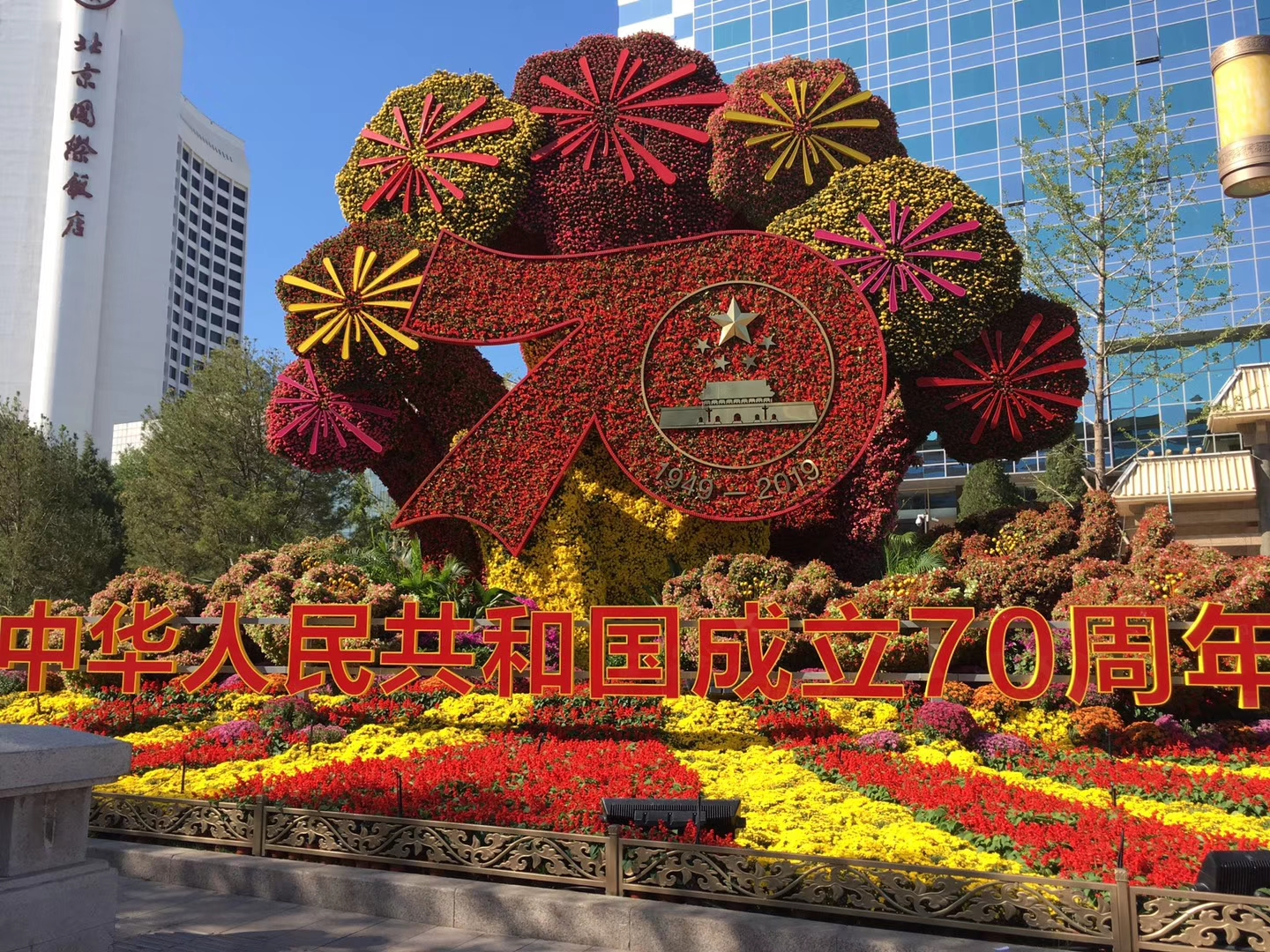
- Flowerbed reading "70th anniversary of the People's Republic of China" on Jianguomen Inner Street near Beijing International Hotel
- Simplified Chinese: 庆祝中华人民共和国成立70周年活动
- Traditional Chinese: 慶祝中華人民共和國成立70週年活動
- Hanyu Pinyin: qìngzhù Zhōnghuá Rénmín Gònghéguó chénglì qīshí zhōunián huódòng
- Literal meaning: celebrating Chinese people's republic's founding seventy anniversary live action
Transcriptions
Standard Mandarin
- Hanyu Pinyin: qìngzhù Zhōnghuá Rénmín Gònghéguó chénglì qīshí zhōunián huódòng
Yue: Cantonese
- Yale Romanization: hingjūk Jūngwàh Yàhnmàhn Guhngwòhgwok sìhnglahp chātsahp jāunìhn wuhtduhng
- Jyutping: hing^{3}zuk^{1} Zung^{1}waa^{4} Jan^{4}man^{4} Gung^{6}wo^{4}gwok^{3} sing^{4}lap^{6} cat^{1}sap^{6} zau^{1}nin^{4} wut^{6}dung^{6}

Alternative Chinese name
- Simplified Chinese: 庆祝中华人民共和国成立70周年大会
- Traditional Chinese: 慶祝中華人民共和國成立70週年大會
- Hanyu Pinyin: qìngzhù Zhōnghuá Rénmín Gònghéguó chénglì qīshí zhōunián dàhuì
- Literal meaning: celebrating Chinese people's republic's founding seventy anniversary mass gathering
Transcriptions
Standard Mandarin
- Hanyu Pinyin: qìngzhù Zhōnghuá Rénmín Gònghéguó chénglì qīshí zhōunián dàhuì
Yue: Cantonese
- Yale Romanization: hingjūk Jūngwàh Yàhnmàhn Guhngwòhgwok sìhnglahp chātsahp jāunìhn daaihwúih
- Jyutping: hing^{3}zuk^{1} Zung^{1}waa^{4} Jan^{4}man^{4} Gung^{6}wo^{4}gwok^{3} sing^{4}lap^{6} zau^{1}nin^{4} daai^{6}wui^{5}

The 70th anniversary of the founding of the People's Republic of China (Chinese: 庆祝中华人民共和国成立70周年) was observed with a series of ceremonial events including a grand military parade as its spotlight to celebrate National Day of the People's Republic of China that took place on 1 October 2019 in Beijing. It was the largest military parade and mass pageant in Chinese history.

Chinese Communist Party (CCP) general secretary Xi Jinping, who was the guest of honour, gave the holiday address to the nation and Chinese expatriates before inspecting the formations along Chang'an Avenue. Premier Li Keqiang was the master of ceremonies and General Yi Xiaoguang was the chief commander of the parade.

== Background ==
The CCP had defeated the Kuomintang Party following the Chinese Civil War, which occurred intermittently between 1927 and 1950 In the aftermath of the civil war, the Kuomintang and its loyalists then retreated to the island of Taiwan, formerly a prefecture of the Qing Empire, which had been under Japanese colonial rule from 1895 to 1945.

The founding of the People's Republic of China was formally proclaimed by Mao Zedong, the Chairman of the Chinese Communist Party, on 1 October 1949 at 3:00 pm in Tiananmen Square in Beijing (formerly Beiping), the new capital (Nanjing had been the capital of the former Republic of China). The first public parade of the then new People's Liberation Army took place there, following the chairman's address of the formal foundation of the new republic. Before this, as the national anthem March of the Volunteers was played, the new national flag of the People's Republic of China was officially unveiled to the newly founded nation and hoisted for the first time during the celebrations as a 21-gun salute fired in the distance.

In its early years, the People's Republic of China was not internationally recognized as the Republic of China held its seat in the United Nations and the Security Council as the sole legitimate government of "China" by the United States and western nations. In 1971, the PRC was admitted to the United Nations and thus excluded the ROC from United Nations membership.

Since the establishment of the PRC, celebrations of varying scales occur on National Day each year. Military parades, presided over by chairman Mao Zedong, were held every year between 1949 and 1959, the first decade of the PRC. In September 1960, the Chinese leadership decided that to save funds and "be frugal", large-scale ceremonies for National Day would only be held every ten years, with a smaller-scale ceremony every five years. (The tradition of the yearly parade, though, would be partially revived with parades held in 1969 and 1970.) Since China's reform and opening up, the most prominent National Day celebrations have taken place in 1984, 1999, and 2009 at the 35th, 50th and 60th anniversaries respectively.

The 70th national anniversary parade was the fifth major parade since Xi Jinping took power as CCP General Secretary (China's paramount leader) and Chairman of the Central Military Commission (Commander-in-chief) in 2012, and occurred with the mass protests in Hong Kong that have been on-going since 9 June as backdrop.

== Preparations ==
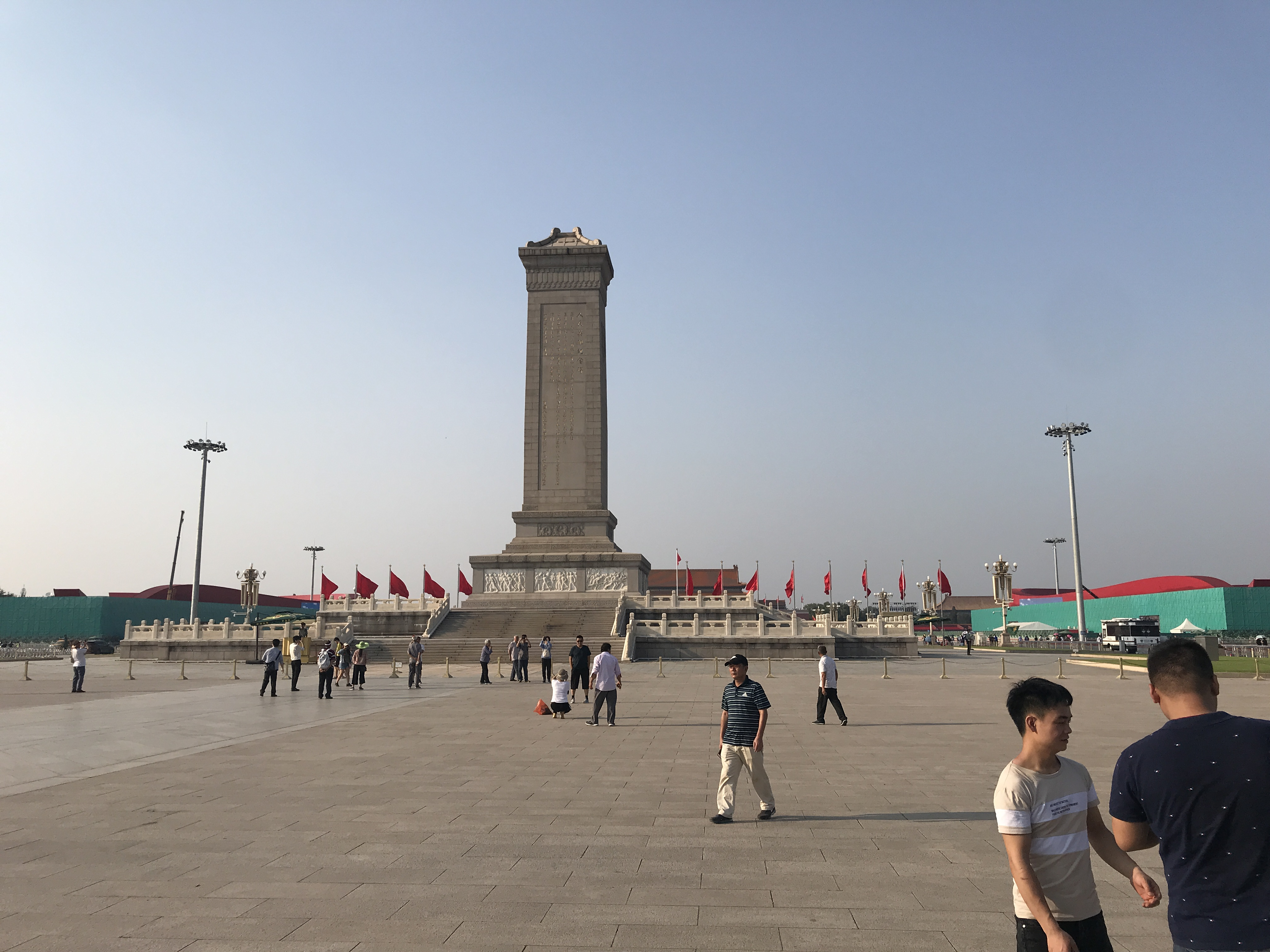
Preparations underway in Tiananmen Square for the National Day Parade

The official logo for the 70th anniversary of the founding of the People's Republic of China was officially unveiled by the State Council Information Office on 3 June 2019. Many celebrations throughout China and overseas Chinese communities were planned for the year of 2019. In early September, rehearsals took place in central Beijing for the military parade. General Cai Zhijun of the Joint General Staff said in a press briefing that it would not be targeted "at any countries or districts" but rather would be "committed to safeguarding world peace and regional stability". It was expected to be bigger than the parades commemorating the 50th and 60th anniversary of the PRC, as well as the 2015 China Victory Day Parade.

The capital was covered with red flags, adorning apartment compounds and neighbourhoods; banners reading "Today's China is the result of the work of Chinese people" were draped across overpasses, and topiaries were installed around the roads in Beijing. The authorities gave out 620,000 television sets allowing those not invited to still be able to watch the festivities.

Although a massive National Day fireworks display had been planned along the harbour in Hong Kong to celebrate the 70th anniversary – as it has done every year since 1997, Hong Kong government cancelled them "for safety reasons" over the protests in the city that have lasted since March. A more low-key celebration was planned in the territory.

=== Security ===
The city of Beijing was in virtual lockdown in the run-up to the anniversary. Objects that could overfly the capital – for example kites, balloons, drones and even pigeons – were banned. The use of walkie-talkies and other devices using radio waves, as well as alcohol, also joined the list of things that were disallowed.

Weeks before the anniversary, motorists were prohibited from refuelling their cars or motorcycles on their own. During rehearsals for a military parade to mark the day, residents close to Tiananmen Square received instructions to stay away from windows and to keep their curtains drawn. Guests in hotels in the vicinity of Tiananmen Square were told that for several hours each day, they would not be able to leave or return to it for hours at a time. Shops and restaurants in the centre closed or shortened their opening hours; some metro stations were closed temporarily.

== Media ==
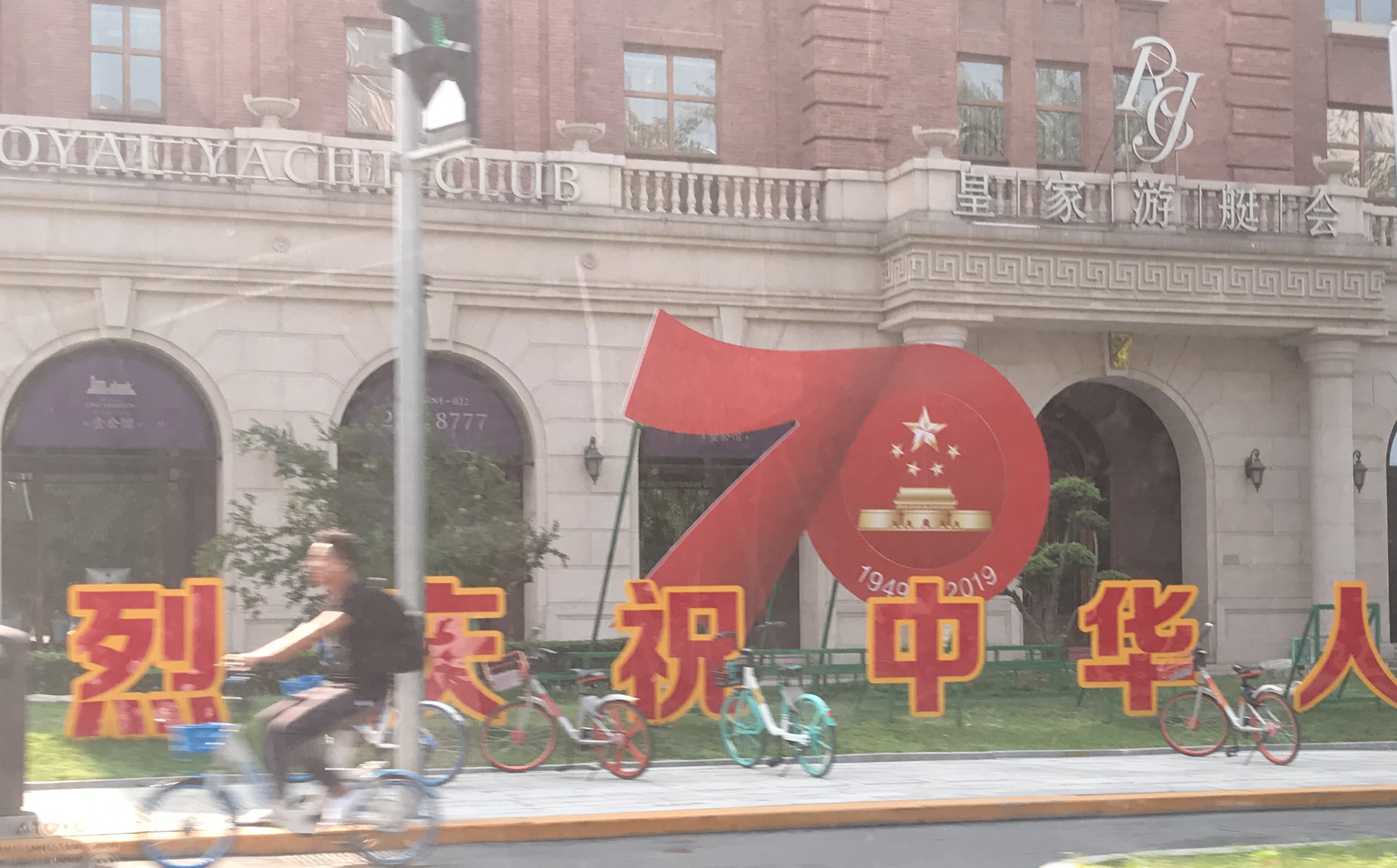
A sign celebrating the 70th anniversary of the founding of the People's Republic in Tianjin

China Media Group (CMG), the state-owned holding firm of the China Central Television (CCTV) network and the China Global Television Network (CGTN) international channels, was expected to mainly broadcast synchronously for domestic and foreign TV channels with CCTV-1 as the producing channel for the celebrations, while national, provincial and city broadcasters and TV stations, domestic internet video, portals, and live webcast sites also broadcast the event simultaneously via the CCTV-1 feed. CGTN broadcast the events live overseas and online, including on YouTube, in multiple languages. In addition, China National Radio and China Radio International, both also owned by CMG, served as the official radio stations broadcasting the festivities. On 4 September 2019, CMG held a mobilization meeting to celebrate the 70th anniversary. More than 260 representatives from its member companies attended the event.

Various overseas media also paid attention to the coverage of this event, and those who already met the conditions could broadcast it worldwide. The "press centre for the celebration of the 70th anniversary of the founding of the People's Republic of China" was based in Beijing's Media Center and was officially launched on 23 September.

A "special clean-up operation" was initiated targeting "harmful political information" and any Sina Weibo accounts or posts that "distort the history of the party and the country".

== Musical concert ==
To mark the special anniversary of national foundation, on Sunday, 29 September, the celebrations began with the CCTV-produced musical concert gala The Nation Moves Onward aired nationwide on CCTV-1 live from the Great Auditorium of the Beijing Great Hall of the People, in which Central Military Commission (CMC) chairman and general secretary of the CCP Xi Jinping attended as guest of honour together with other party and national leaders, veterans of the PLA and other invited guests.

== Wreath-laying ceremony ==
The 15th annual wreath laying ceremony in honour of the heroes and martyrs of the Chinese nation and people was held in earnest on 30 September, National Memorial Day, on the grounds of Tiananmen Square which CMC Chairman and General Secretary of the CCP Xi Jinping attended as guest of honour, together with other party and national leaders, veterans of the PLA, distinguished citizens, the Young Pioneers and representatives of the civil service and the private sector, in which flowers and wreaths were laid in the Monument to the People's Heroes.

In an earlier ceremony at the Great Hall of the People, 42 individuals, including several foreigners, were awarded by paramount leader Xi as part of the National Day honours list (several of the awards were posthumous) with national orders and decorations for merit and service to the republic and people as well as to contributing to enhanced ties with foreign countries.

== Civil-military parade ==
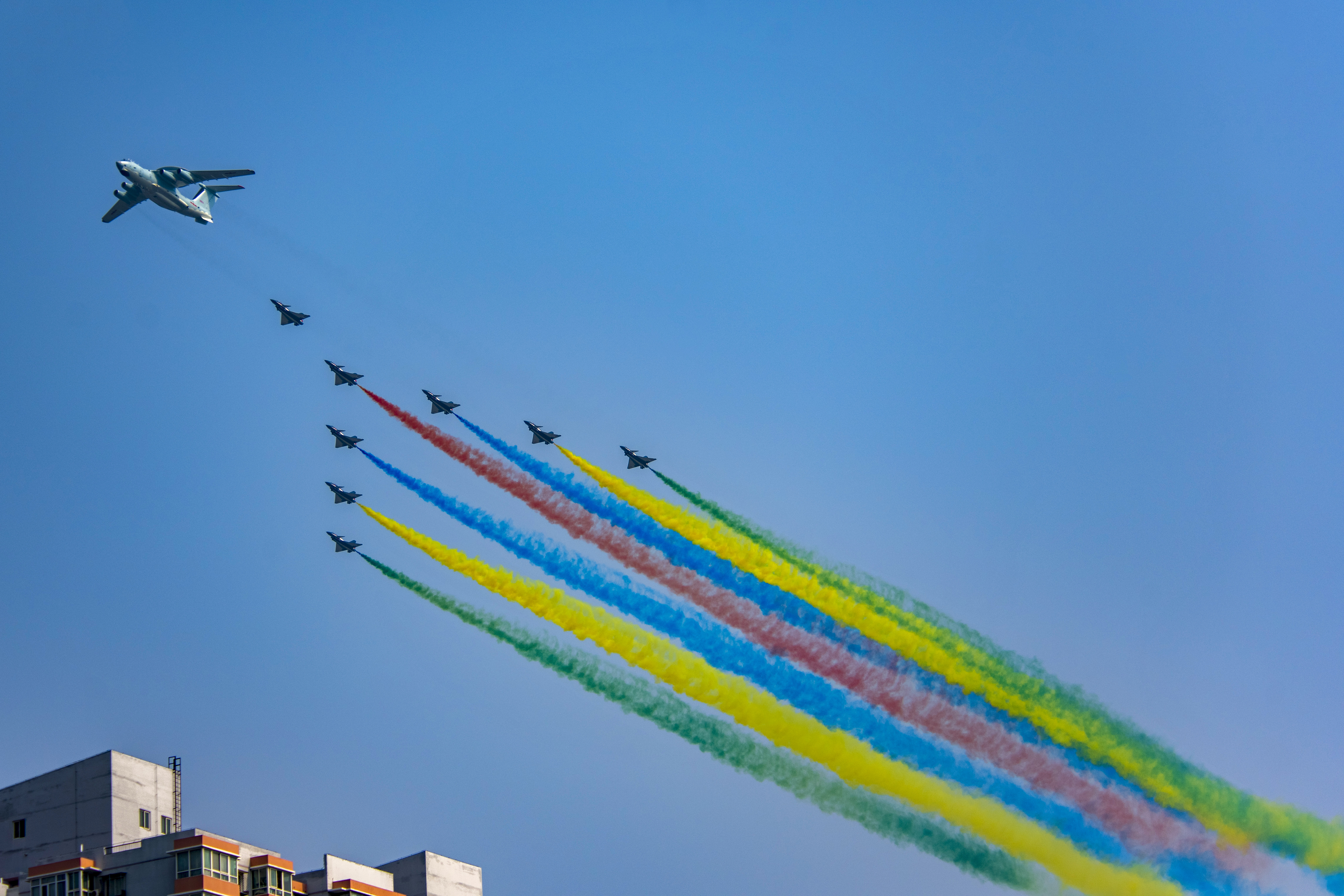
KJ-2000 and J-10s started the flypast formation

=== Leaders in attendance ===
- Xi Jinping (CCP General Secretary, President and CMC chairman)
- Jiang Zemin (former General Secretary of the CCP, 1989–2002)
- Hu Jintao (former General Secretary of the CCP, 2002–2012)
- Li Keqiang (Premier, official master of ceremonies for the parade)
- Li Zhanshu (Congress chairman)
- Wang Yang (Conference chairman)
- Wang Huning (First Secretary of the CCP Secretariat)
- Zhao Leji (Secretary of Discipline Inspection)
- Han Zheng (First Vice Premier)
- Wang Qishan (Vice President)
- Li Ruihuan (former Conference chairman, 1993–2003)
- Wu Bangguo (former Congress chairman, 2003–2013)
- Wen Jiabao (former Premier, 2003–2013)
- Jia Qinglin (former Conference chairman, 2003–2013)
- Song Ping (former head of the CCP Organization Department, 1987–1989)
- Other CCP Politburo Standing Committee members and CCP Politburo members

=== Military parade ===
The flags of the Chinese Communist Party, the People's Republic of China and the People's Liberation Army

==== Infantry formation ====
In order of appearance:

- People's Liberation Army Guard of Honour (中国人民解放军仪仗大队)
- PLA Leaders/Commanders Formation (领导指挥方队, a combined battalion of commissioned officers from the CMC, various PLA and PAP branches)
- PLA Ground Force Formation (陆军方队) represented by the 82nd Group Army
- PLA Navy Formation (海军方队)
- PLA Air Force Formation (空军方队) represented by the Airborne Corps
- PLA Rocket Force Formation (火箭军方队)
- PLA Strategic Support Force Formation (战略支援部队方队)
- Joint Logistics Support Force Formation (联勤保障部队方队)
- People's Armed Police Formation (武警部队方队)
- Female Soldiers Formation (女兵方队)
- Institute Researchers Formation (院校科研方队, a combined cadet battalion of PLA educational, research and development institutions) represented by officer cadets from the Academy of Military Science, National Defence University and National University of Defense Technology
- Civilian Staff Formation (文职人员方队, a combined battalion of civilian personnel in the CMC and PLA)
- PLA Reserve Service Forces Formation (预备役部队方队)
- Female Militia Formation (女民兵方队, from the Chaoyang District, nicknamed the "Iron Roses")
- Chinese Peacekeeping Forces Formation (维和部队方队) represented by the 81st Group Army

==== Vehicle column ====
In order of appearance:

- War Flag Formation (战旗方队), represented by CSK-181 "Warrior" off-road vehicles bearing battle colours from 100 heroic companies from each service branch of the PLA
- Ground Warfare Module (陆上作战模块)
  - Tank Formation (坦克方队): Type 99A main battle tank
  - Light Armor Formation (轻型装甲方队): Type 15 light tank, Type 04A infantry fighting vehicle
  - Amphibious Assault Vehicle Formation (两栖突击车方队): Type 05A amphibious assault vehicle
  - Airborne Combat Vehicle Formation (空降兵战车方队): Type 03 airborne infantry fighting vehicle
  - Self-Propelled Artillery Formation (Chinese: 自行火炮方队): PCL-181 truck-mounted 155mm gun-howitzer, PHL-16 long-range multiple rocket launcher
  - Anti-Tank Missile Formation (反坦克导弹方队): HJ-10 anti-tank missile vehicle
  - Special Operations Equipment Formation (特战装备方队): CS/VP4 "Lynx" all-terrain vehicle, "Hunting Eagle" Assault Gyrocopter
  - Armed Police Counterterrorism Assault Formation (武警反恐突击方队): "Warrior" counter-terrorism assault vehicle, WJ-03B anti-riot armored vehicle
- Naval Warfare Module (海上作战模块)
  - Coast-to-Ship Missile Formation (岸舰导弹方队): YJ-12B anti-ship missile
  - Ship/Submarine-to-Ship Missile Formation (舰舰/潜舰导弹方队): YJ-18A anti-ship missile, YJ-18B submarine-launched anti-ship missile
  - Shipborne Air Defense Weapon Formation (舰载防空武器方队): HHQ-9B long-range anti-air missile, HQ-16 medium-range anti-air missile, HQ-10 short-range anti-air missile, H/PJ-11 CWIS
- Air Defense/Anti-Missile Module (防空反导模块)
  - Early-Warning Radar Formation (预警雷达方队)
  - 1st Surface-to-Air Missile Formation (地空导弹第一方队): HQ-9B long-range anti-air missile, HQ-22 long-range anti-air missile
  - 2nd Surface-to-Air Missile Formation (地空导弹第二方队): HQ-12A medium-range anti-air missile, HQ-6 short-range anti-air missile
  - Field Air Defense Missile Formation (野战防空导弹方队): HQ-17A short-range anti-air missile, HQ-16B medium-range anti-air missile
- Information Warfare Module (信息作战模块)
  - 1st Information Warfare Formation (信息作战第一方队)
  - 2nd Information Warfare Formation (信息作战第二方队)
  - 3rd Information Warfare Formation (信息作战第三方队)
  - 4th Information Warfare Formation (信息作战第四方队)
- Unmanned Warfare Module (无人作战模块)
  - 1st Drone Warfare Formation (无人作战第一方队): WZ-8 high-altitude hypersonic stealth UAV
  - 2nd Drone Warfare Formation (无人作战第二方队): "Wing Loong-2" HALE UCAV, "Sharp Sword" stealth UAV
  - 3rd Drone Warfare Formation (无人作战第三方队): HSU-001 unmanned underwater vehicle
- Logistics & Equipment Support Module (后装保障模块)
  - Supply & Provision Formation (补给供应方队): Field vehicles for water purification, platform-laying, refueling and food processing
  - Repair & Rescue Formation (抢修抢救方队): Field vehicles for combat surgery, equipment recovery, disassembly and repair and search and rescue
- Strategic Strike Module (战略打击模块)
  - DF-17 Conventional Missile Formation (东风-17常规导弹方队)
  - CJ-100 Cruise Missile Formation (长剑-100巡航导弹方队)
  - DF-26 Nuclear/Conventional Missile Formation (东风-26核常兼备导弹方队)
  - JL-2 Missile Formation (巨浪-2导弹方队)
  - DF-31AG Nuclear Missile Formation (东风-31甲改核导弹方队)
  - DF-5B Nuclear Missile Formation (东风-5B核导弹方队)
  - DF-41 Nuclear Missile Formation (东风-41核导弹方队)

==== Flypast column ====
- Command Echelon (领队机梯队)
  - One KJ-2000 AEWC aircraft, eight J-10A fighters from the August 1st Aerobatics Team with colored smoke
- Early Warning & Control Echelon (预警指挥机梯队) in three formations:
  - One KJ-500 AEWC aircraft, four J-16 strike fighters
  - One KJ-200 AEWC aircraft, four J-16 strike fighters
  - One Y-8 C&C aircraft, four J-16 strike fighters
- Maritime Patrol Echelon (海上巡逻机梯队) in two formations:
  - One KJ-500H AEWC aircraft, two Y-8G ASW patrol aircraft
  - One KJ-500H AEWC aircraft, two Y-8G reconnaissance aircraft
- Transporter Echelon (运输机梯队) in two formations:
  - Three Y-20 strategic airlifters
  - Three Y-9 tactical airlifters
- Support & Security Echelon (支援保障机梯队) in two formations:
  - One Y-9 electronic-warfare aircraft, one Y-9 psychological warfare aircraft, one Y-9 aeromedical aircraft
  - One Y-8 long-range support jammer aircraft, one Y-8 electronic-warfare aircraft, one Y-8 electronic reconnaissance aircraft
- Bomber Echelon (轰炸机梯队) in three formations:
  - Three H-6N long-range strategic bombers
  - Three H-6K bombers
  - Three H-6K bombers
- Refueller Echelon (加受油机梯队)
  - One HY-6 tanker aircraft, two J-10B air superiority fighters
- Carrier-Based Aircraft Echelon (舰载机梯队)
  - Five J-15 carrier-based multirole fighters
- Fighter Echelon (歼击机梯队) in three formations:
  - Five J-20 stealth fighters
  - Five J-16 strike fighters
  - Five J-10C multirole fighters
- Army Aviation Assault Echelon (陆航突击梯队) in five formations:
  - Reconnaissance & Alert Module (侦察警戒模块): five Z-9 armed reconnaissance helicopters
  - Firepower Assault Module (火力突击模块): nine WZ-10 attack helicopters
  - Troop Assault Module (兵力突击模块): three WZ-19 reconnaissance/attack helicopters, six Z-20 general utility helicopters
  - Landing Assault Module (机降突击模块): nine Z-8B transport helicopters
  - Escort Module (护航模块): eight WZ-19 attack helicopters
- Trainer Echelon (教练机梯队) in four formations:
  - Five JL-10 trainers
  - Five JL-9 trainers
  - Five JL-8 trainers
  - Seven JL-8 trainers with colored smoke

=== Civilian parade ===
In order of appearance:

- Flag of the People's Republic of China
- National Emblem of the People's Republic of China preceded by the years 1949 and 2019
- Red flag bearers
- Open-top buses carrying family members and relatives of the founding fathers of the PRC, members of the Central People's Government and deputies of the CPPCC, as well as veterans of the People's Liberation Army and living participants of the 1949 parade, escorted by motorcycle riders of People's Armed Police

=== Music ===
The Central Military Band of the People's Liberation Army of China is composed of 1,321 musicians. The head and chief commander is Zhang Haifeng. For the first time, the military orchestra used military instruments such as military numbers, long ceremonies, and timpani drums during the National Day military parade. In this military parade, a total of 28 pieces of music were played, such as "March of the Steel Torrent", "Chongshang Yunxiao", "Honor to the Horn", "Divided Horn", etc. 12 of which are classic marches and 16 are new pieces. On National Day, there were a total of 50 rehearsals for the parade and mass parade, including 25 military parades and masses. The mass parade will also join the 2,100 adult choirs, 400 children's choirs from the Central Radio and Television Station Galaxy Junior Television Art Troupe and the 130 National Percussion Orchestra, claiming to be the world's largest "square concert".

==== Military parade ====
Inspection

1. Welcome March (欢迎进行曲)
2. March of the Volunteers (National Anthem of the People's Republic of China)
3. The Horn and Overture (致敬号角)
4. Military Parade (阅兵式号角)
5. The People's Army is Loyal to the Party
6. Military Anthem of the People's Liberation Army
7. Troops Review March of the PLA (Inspection March of the PLA) (检阅进行曲)
8. Three Rules of Discipline and Eight Points for Attention
9. The New Army Goes Forward (新型陆军向前进)
10. People's Navy, Forward (人民海军向前进)
11. March of the PLA Air Force (中国空军进行曲)
12. March of the People's Liberation Army Rocket Force (火箭军进行曲)
13. Song of the Loyal Guards (忠诚卫士之歌)
14. Battle Hymn of the Strong Army (强军战歌)
15. Please Review (请你检阅)

Marching

1. Divisional Horn (分列式号角)
2. Parade March of the People's Liberation Army (分列式进行曲)
3. Steel Torrent March (钢铁洪流进行曲)
4. Blue Journey March (蓝色征程进行曲)
5. Eagle Strike March (雄鹰出击进行曲)
6. Thousand-Mile Decisive Victory March (决胜千里进行曲)
7. Sweeping East Wind March (东风浩荡进行曲)
8. Rushing into the Clouds (冲上云霄)
9. Glorious Moments (辉煌时刻)
10. Victory is Upon Us (胜利在召唤)

==== Civilian parade ====
1. Ode to the Red Flag (红旗颂)
2. Ode to the Motherland
3. Without the Communist Party, There Would Be No New China
4. The East is Red
5. Socialism is Good

== National Day evening gala ==
A 90-minute grand evening gala was slated to be held at the Tiananmen Square at 8:00 p.m. 60,000 people attended the evening gala, including a total of at least 6,940 performers at the grounds of the square. CMC Chairman and General Secretary Xi Jinping was the guest of honour of the gala night, together with other party and national leaders present.

== Reactions ==
=== Hong Kong ===
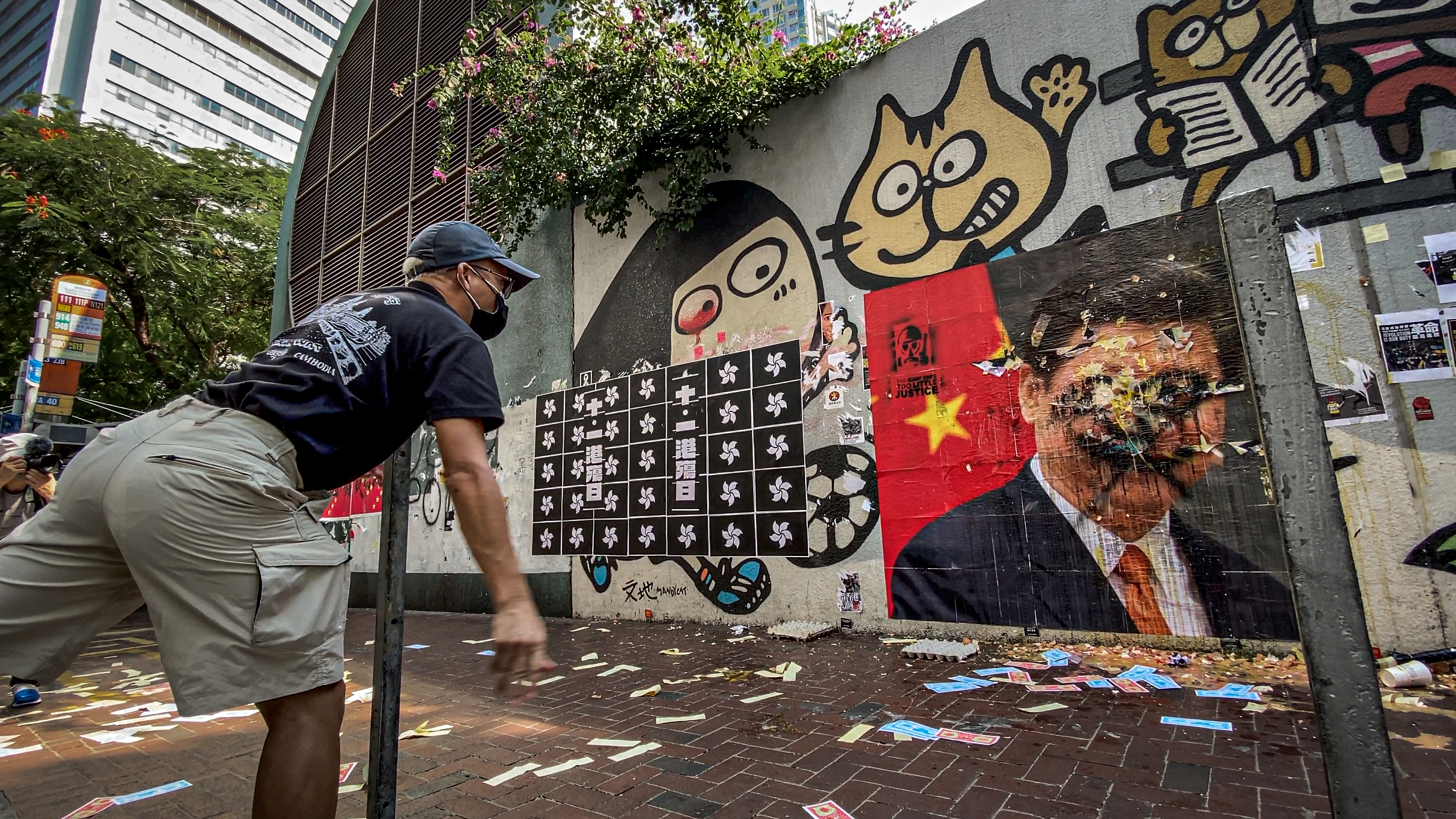
Protesters throwing eggs at CCP general secretary Xi Jinping's portrait

Hong Kong protesters marked a "national day of mourning". In defiance of a police ban on the annual march that the Civil Human Rights Front (CHRF) applied for, four veteran democrats led a rally from Causeway Bay to Central, mourning the victims of CCP rule and calling for the end of one-party rule in mainland China. Simultaneously, protesters held rallies in Wong Tai Sin, Tuen Mun, Tsuen Wan, Sha Tin and Sham Shui Po, which drew tens of thousands of participants. The protests were initially peaceful, but violent incidents occurred later during the day. MTR stations and businesses that were thought to be associated with the mainland were vandalised. Multiple warning shots were fired in various popular districts; in Tsuen Wan, a police officer fired a live round at an 18-year-old male secondary school student who tried to take his revolver at point blank range with it. It was the first live round fired at a person by the Hong Kong police in this series of protests. The protester was rushed to hospital in a critical condition.

=== Taiwan ===
In Taiwan, the governing pro-independence party Democratic Progressive Party (DPP) denounced the PRC and CCP as threats to peace and trying to find excuses for its military expansion and rejects the "One country, two systems" model. DPP leader and ROC president Tsai Ing-wen told reporters that "We are a country of democracy and freedom and will show support for anyone in the world who pursues democracy and freedom. Likewise, any ruler should carefully listen to the people's pursuit of freedom and democracy and respect the people's will."

Some members of the pro-unification opposition party Kuomintang (KMT) called on the DPP to accept the 1992 Consensus while rejecting the Taiwan independence movement.

== See also ==
- National Day of the People's Republic of China
- Golden Week (China)
- 10th anniversary of the People's Republic of China
- 60th anniversary of the People's Republic of China
- 1987 October Revolution Parade
