= Towards Revival =

"Towards Revival" (simplified Chinese: 走向复兴; traditional Chinese: 走向復興; pinyin: Zǒuxiàng fùxīng) is a Chinese patriotic song composed by Yin Qing and written by Li Weifu in 2009 for the 60th anniversary of the People's Republic of China. Production of the song was jointly organised by the Shenzhen Municipal Party Committee Propaganda Department and the Shenzhen Broadcasting Group, and was meant to commemorate the progress made by the Chinese Communist Party since the foundation of the People's Republic of China.

== Production ==
"Towards Revival" was written to be used as the finale of The Road to Recovery, a song and dance epic made to commemorate the 60th anniversary of the People's Republic of China. The song was jointly commissioned by the Shenzhen Municipal Party Committee Propaganda Department and Shenzhen Radio and Television Group to portray and follow "footsteps of the Republic in the past 60 years". The song was initially envisioned as a traditional march, but was altered in production to cater to a modern audience, eventually being modified and reworked as many as one hundred times. Lyrically, the song was intended to signify the rejuvenation of China, adopting an optimistic outlook on the future of the People's Republic. The song proved to be popular among both the Chinese population and the state, and was played at the opening ceremony of the 16th Asian Games in Guangzhou, the 90th Anniversary of the Chinese Communist Party Celebrations, the opening ceremony of the Shenzhen World University Games in 2011, and numerous regional celebrations and festivals. The song also received several awards, most notably the Five One Project award in September 2012.

== Lyrics ==
Simplified Chinese	Traditional Chinese	Pinyin	English translation
我们迎着初升的太阳， 走在崭新的道路上。 我们是优秀的中华儿女， 谱写时代的新篇章。 我们迎着风雨向前方， 万众一心挽起臂膀。 我们要把亲爱的祖国， 变得更加美丽富强。 前进！ 前进！ 向前进！ 挺起胸膛何惧风浪！ 前进！ 前进！ 向前进！ 肩负民族的希望！ 我们迎着灿烂的阳光， 飞向太空驰骋海洋。 我们是英雄的中华儿女， 古老文明焕发新光芒。 我们迎着胜利向前方， 振兴中华是我们理想。 我们迈着坚定的步伐， 中国屹立在世界东方。 前进！ 前进！ 向前进！ 排山倒海不可阻挡！ 前进！ 前进！ 向前进！ 走向复兴创造辉煌！ 前进！ 前进！ 向前进！ 排山倒海不可阻挡！ 前进！ 前进！ 向前进！ 走向复兴创造辉煌！ 走向复兴！ 走向复兴！ 走向复兴创造辉煌！	我們迎著初升的太陽， 走在嶄新的道路上。 我們是優秀的中華兒女， 譜寫時代的新篇章。 我們迎著風雨向前方， 萬眾一心挽起臂膀。 我們要把親愛的祖國， 變得更加美麗富強。 前進！前進！向前進！挺起胸膛何懼風浪！ 前進！前進！向前進！肩負民族的希望！ 我們迎著燦爛的陽光， 飛向太空馳騁海洋。 我們是英雄的中華兒女， 古老文明煥發新光芒。 我們迎著勝利向前方， 振興中華是我們理想。 我們邁著堅定的步伐， 中國屹立在世界東方。 前進！前進！向前進！ 排山倒海不可阻擋！ 前進！前進！向前進！ 走向復興創造輝煌！ 前進！前進！向前進！ 排山倒海不可阻擋！ 前進！前進！向前進！ 走向復興創造輝煌！ 走向復興！走向復興！ 走向復興創造輝煌！	wǒ mén yíng zhuó chū shēng dí tài yáng ， zǒu zài zhǎn xīn dí dào lù shàng 。 wǒ mén shì yōu xiù dí zhōng huá ér nǚ ， pǔ xiě shí dài dí xīn piān zhāng 。 wǒ mén yíng zhuó fēng yǔ xiàng qián fāng ， wàn zhòng yī xīn wǎn qǐ bì bǎng 。 wǒ mén yào bǎ qīn ài dí zǔ guó ， biàn dé gēng jiā měi lì fù qiáng 。 qián jìn ！qián jìn ！xiàng qián jìn ！ tǐng qǐ xiōng táng hé jù fēng làng ！ qián jìn ！qián jìn ！xiàng qián jìn ！ jiān fù mín zú dí xī wàng ！ wǒ mén yíng zhuó càn làn dí yáng guāng ， fēi xiàng tài kōng chí chěng hǎi yáng 。 wǒ mén shì yīng xióng dí zhōng huá ér nǚ ， gǔ lǎo wén míng huàn fā xīn guāng máng 。 wǒ mén yíng zhuó shèng lì xiàng qián fāng ， zhèn xīng zhōng huá shì wǒ mén lǐ xiǎng 。 wǒ mén mài zhuó jiān dìng dí bù fá ， zhōng guó yì lì zài shì jiè dōng fāng 。 qián jìn ！qián jìn ！xiàng qián jìn ！ pái shān dǎo hǎi bù kě zǔ dǎng ！ qián jìn ！qián jìn ！xiàng qián jìn ！ zǒu xiàng fù xīng chuàng zào huī huáng ！ qián jìn ！qián jìn ！xiàng qián jìn ！ pái shān dǎo hǎi bù kě zǔ dǎng ！ qián jìn ！qián jìn ！xiàng qián jìn ！ zǒu xiàng fù xīng chuàng zào huī huáng ！ zǒu xiàng fù xīng ！zǒu xiàng fù xīng ！ zǒu xiàng fù xīng chuàng zào huī huáng ！	We are facing the rising sun and walking on a new road. We are outstanding Chinese children and write a new chapter of the era. We faced the wind and rain in front of one another, and all of us swept our arms. We must make our dear motherland more beautiful and prosperous. Go ahead! Go ahead! Go ahead! Straighten your chest and fear the storm! Go ahead! Go ahead! Go ahead! Shoulder the hope of the nation! We are welcoming the bright sun and fly into space to ride the ocean. We are the sons and daughters of Chinese heroes, and the ancient civilization glows with new light. We are facing forward with victory and it is our ideal to revive China. We are taking firm steps and China stands in the East of the world. Go ahead! Go ahead! Go ahead! Unstoppable! Go ahead! Go ahead! Go ahead! To rejuvenate and create brilliantly! Go ahead! Go ahead! Go ahead! Unstoppable! Go ahead! Go ahead! Go ahead! To rejuvenate and create brilliantly! To rejuvenate! To rejuvenate! To rejuvenate and create brilliantly!

== See also ==
- Dong Fang Hong I
- The East Is Red (1965 film)
- Honglaowai
- Maoism
- "Ode to the Motherland"
- "Sailing the Seas Depends on the Helmsman"
- "Without the Communist Party, There Would Be No New China"
- Xi Jinping
- Shenzhen
