= The East Is Red (song) =

De facto national anthem of the People's Republic of China in the 1960s

東方紅 Dōngfāng Hóng
English: The East is Red
- Former national anthem of the People's Republic of China
- Lyrics: Li Youyuan
- Adopted: 1966
- Relinquished: 1976

Audio sample
- Chord progression of Baima Diao, an ancient folk tune from Shaanxi that has shares the same melody with "The East Is Red": file; help

The East Is Red
- Traditional Chinese: 東方紅
- Simplified Chinese: 东方红
Transcriptions
Standard Mandarin
- Hanyu Pinyin: Dōngfāng Hóng

"The East Is Red" is a Chinese Communist Party revolutionary song that was the de facto national anthem of the People's Republic of China during the Cultural Revolution in the 1960s. The lyrics of the song were attributed to Li Youyuan (李有源), a farmer from Shaanbei (northern Shaanxi), and the melody was derived from a local peasant love song from the Loess Plateau entitled "Bai Ma Diao" (《白马调》, White Horse Tune), also known as "Zhima You" (《芝麻油》, Sesame Oil), which was widely circulated in the area around Yan'an in the 1930s. The farmer allegedly got his inspiration upon seeing the rising sun in the morning of a sunny day.

== History ==
=== Early history ===
The lyrics to "The East Is Red" were adapted from an old Shaanxi folk song White Horse Tune. The lyrics were often changed depending on the singer. The modern lyrics (attributed to Li Youyuan, a farmer from northern Shaanxi) were produced in 1942 during the Second Sino-Japanese War. It is possible that there was an earlier version that referenced Liu Zhidan (a local communist hero), who was killed in Shanxi in 1936. Later, Mao's name replaced Liu's in the lyrics. The song was popular in the Communist base-area of Yan'an, but became less popular after the Chinese Communist Party (CCP) won the Chinese Civil War and established the People's Republic of China in 1949, possibly because some senior CCP leaders disagreed with the song's portrayal of Mao Zedong as "China's savior".

The lyrics of "The East Is Red" idealize Mao Zedong, and Mao's popularization of "The East Is Red" was one of his earliest efforts to promote his image as a perfect hero in Chinese popular culture after the Korean War. In 1956, a political commissar suggested to China's defense minister, Peng Dehuai, that the song be taught to Chinese troops, but Peng opposed Mao's propaganda, saying "That is a personality cult! That is idealism!" Peng's opposition to "The East Is Red", and to Mao's incipient personality cult in general, contributed to Mao purging Peng in 1959. After Peng was purged, Mao accelerated his efforts to build his personality cult; by 1966, he succeeded in having "The East Is Red" sung in place of China's national anthem in an unofficial capacity.

In 1964, Zhou Enlai used "The East Is Red" as the central chorus for a play he created to promote the personality cult of Mao Zedong, with "March Forward under the Banner of Mao Zedong Thought" as the original title. Zhou also served as co-producer, head writer and director of the play. The central theme of the play was that Mao was the only person capable of leading the CCP to victory. The play was performed by 2,000 artists, and was accompanied by a 1,000-strong chorus and orchestra. It was staged repeatedly in Beijing at the Great Hall of the People in order to ensure that all residents would be able to see it (this was in time for the 15th National Day of the People's Republic of China), and was later adapted into a feature film, also titled "The East Is Red," that was shown all over China. It was in this play that the definitive version of the song was heard for the first time; this would be the version used in events during the Cultural Revolution until 1969.

During the Cultural Revolution, Tian Han, the author of China's official national anthem, "March of the Volunteers", was purged; as a result, that song was rarely used. "The East Is Red" was used as China's unofficial national anthem during this time. The song was played through PA systems in towns and villages across China at dawn and at dusk. The Custom House on the Bund in Shanghai still plays the song in place of the Westminster Chimes that were originally played by the British. The Central People's Broadcasting Station began broadcasts every day by playing the song on a set of bronze bells that had been cast over 2,000 years earlier during the Warring States period. Radio and television broadcasts nationwide usually began with the song "The East Is Red" in the morning or at early evening, and ended with the song "The Internationale". In 1967, the commune (now township) of Ujme in Akto County, Kizilsu, Xinjiang was renamed Dongfanghong Commune (literally "The East Is Red Commune": 东方红公社).

Students were obliged to sing the song in unison every morning at the beginning of the first class of the day. In 1969, the tune was used in the Yellow River Piano Concerto. The Concerto was produced by Jiang Qing and adapted from the Yellow River Cantata by Xian Xinghai. When she adapted the Cantata, Jiang added the tune to "The East Is Red" in order to connect the Concerto with the themes of the Cultural Revolution. China's first satellite, launched in 1970, shared its name with the song, which was the first signal the craft sent back to Earth. However, the status of "The East Is Red" as the unofficial national anthem was relinquished in 1978; beginning on October 1 of that year, the current official national anthem, March of the Volunteers, was readopted and played (albeit only in its instrumental version) once again in all national events.

=== Modern China ===
The East Is Red played from the Beijing Telegraph Building

Because of its associations with the Cultural Revolution, the song was rarely heard after the rise of Deng Xiaoping in the late 1970s. To this day, the song is considered by some in China to be a somewhat unseemly reminder of the cult of personality associated with Mao. Its official use has largely been replaced by the "March of the Volunteers", whose lyrics mention neither the CCP nor Mao. "The East Is Red" is still commonly heard in recordings played by electronic cigarette lighters bearing Mao's face that are popular with tourists.

The tune of "The East Is Red" remains popular in Chinese popular culture. In 2009, it was voted as the most popular patriotic song in a Chinese government-run internet poll. It is used as the chime for striking clocks like Beijing railway station and the Beijing Telegraph Building, Shanghai Customs House as well as the Drum Tower in Xi'an.

Some radio stations in China have used "The East Is Red" as an interval signal, including China Radio International (Indonesian service) and Xinjiang People's Radio Station.

== See also ==
- Dong Fang Hong I
- Honglaowai
- The East Is Red, 1965 film
- List of socialist songs
- Socialist music from China:
  - "Ode to the Motherland"
  - "Socialism is Good"
  - "Sailing the Seas Depends on the Helmsman"
  - "Without the Communist Party, There Would Be No New China"
