= 2014 visit by Xi Jinping to Macau =

Visit of Xi Jinping to Macau
- Date: December 19 to 20, 2014
- Venue: Macau
- Organised by: Government of Macau; Government of China

In December 2014, Xi Jinping, the general secretary of the Chinese Communist Party, visited inspect Macau to attend the celebrations the 15th anniversary of Macau's handover to China.

On December 14, 2014, Xinhua News Agency announced that Xi Jinping would visit Macau from December 19 to 20 of that year to attend the celebration of the 15th anniversary of Macau's return to China and the inauguration ceremony of the fourth government of the Macau Special Administrative Region. This was Xi Jinping's second visit to Macau since he became a member of the Politburo Standing Committee in 2007 ; it was also his first visit to Macau since he was elected CCP General Secretary in 2012; and it was also his fifth visit to Macau since he served as Governor of Fujian and Party Secretary of Zhejiang.

== Announcement ==
On December 18, 2014, the Macau Special Administrative Region Government announced that Xi Jinping would arrive in Macau on December 19 of that year to attend the celebration of the 15th anniversary of Macau's return to China and to preside over the inauguration ceremony of the fourth government of the Macau Special Administrative Region. After arriving in Macau, Xi Jinping first met with the then Chief Executive Chui Sai On, who was successfully re-elected, and then met with the current officials of the Macau Special Administrative Region and people from all walks of life in Macau. In the evening, he attended the welcome banquet and the “Celebration of the 15th Anniversary of Macau’s Return to the Motherland” hosted by the SAR Government. On the morning of December 20, Xi Jinping attended the “Celebration of the 15th Anniversary of Macau’s Return to the Motherland and the Inauguration Ceremony of the Fourth Government of the Macau Special Administrative Region”, and then met with the newly appointed executive, legislative and judicial officials of the Macau Special Administrative Region. He left Macau after completing his itinerary in the afternoon.

== Visit ==
=== 19 December ===
At approximately noon, the special plane carrying Xi Jinping, General Secretary of the CCP Central Committee, and his entourage arrived at Macau International Airport. After the plane landed on the tarmac, Chief Executive Chui Sai On and his wife boarded the aircraft to welcome them. Upon disembarking, Xi Jinping and his wife received bouquets from a pair of primary school students from Hou Kong Middle School and shook hands with the main officials present along the red carpet. They were warmly welcomed by 300 primary school students from Hou Kong, Lao School, and Jing Ping School, who were carrying national flags, regional flags, and silk flowers. Xi Jinping and his wife frequently waved to the welcoming crowd. Xi Jinping then gave a brief speech to the media on the airport tarmac, expressing his pleasure at being able to visit Macau again after five years and taking this opportunity to convey his sincere greetings and best wishes to all Macau residents. In his brief speech at the airport, Xi Jinping stated that he was very pleased to be visiting Macau again after more than five years. His last visit to Macau was during his tenure as Secretary of the Secretariat of the CCP Central Committee and Vice President of the People's Republic of China, during which he met with many journalists. He took this opportunity to convey his sincere greetings and best wishes to all of Macau through his journalist friends. Xi Jinping also said that his purpose in coming to Macau was to celebrate the 15th anniversary of Macau's return to China with the Macau compatriots, to convey the blessings of the central government and the people of all ethnic groups across the country to the Macau compatriots, and that he was very willing to visit the Macau compatriots, review the 15-year history of Macau's return to China and the construction and development of the SAR government, and plan for long-term development. He believed that on the correct path guided by the one country, two systems and the Basic Law, Macau will definitely move more steadily and better.

After arriving in Macau, Xi Jinping first met with then Chief Executive Chui Sai On. The Central Government decided to present a pair of giant pandas to Macau, hoping that they would grow up healthily in Macau and bring joy to the people of Macau. He also expressed that the Central Government fully supports your work and the work of the Special Administrative Region Government, and attaches great importance to the matters you have requested the Central Government to support. It has decided to start the relevant work on clarifying the scope of the customary waters of the Macau Special Administrative Region.

In the afternoon, Xi Jinping first inspected the planning and construction of the Seac Pai Van public housing complex and visited two public housing residents. Xi Jinping first went to Block 5 of Lok Kwan Building to view the model and listened to Liu Rong, then Director of the Urban Planning Department of the Land, Public Works and Transport Bureau, explain the overall planning and construction of the Macau public housing complex. Xi Jinping also suggested that green belts and environmental protection facilities should be added. He then visited two public housing residents. The two households were a construction worker and a logistics worker, respectively. Xi Jinping asked about their living environment, supporting facilities, and their living, working, traveling and student learning conditions. Before leaving, Xi Jinping gave the households a vase and tableware as a souvenir.

At the same time, Xi Jinping's wife Peng Liyuan, accompanied by then-Chief Executive Chui Sai On's wife Huo Huifen, visited the Macau Women's Federation School Kindergarten, which was located in Shui Keng Wei at the time. In the classroom, Peng Liyuan watched the children sing the song “Seven Sons Song”. When the children's song “Finding Friends” played, the children excitedly formed a circle and invited Peng Liyuan to join them. Peng Liyuan happily came to the children. “Give a salute, shake hands, you are my good friend!” The scene was filled with cheers. Afterwards, Peng Liyuan went to the classroom and watched the children learn arithmetic problems with tablet computers. When the correct answers were displayed on the screen, Peng Liyuan praised them repeatedly. In the auditorium, Peng Liyuan watched the children participate in rhythmic and balance training and other physical activities, and applauded and cheered for the children. At the end of the visit, the children shouted “Goodbye, Auntie” and waved goodbye to Peng Liyuan with reluctance. Peng Liyuan waved to the children and said, “Goodbye, children, welcome to come to Beijing to play”.

Xi Jinping's second stop was the East Asian Games Dome in Macau, where he met with people from all walks of life, as well as Leung Chun-ying, then Chief Executive of the Hong Kong Special Administrative Region, and Edmund Ho, Vice Chairman of the National Committee of the Chinese People's Political Consultative Conference.

In the evening, Xi Jinping attended the "Banquet Celebrating the 15th Anniversary of the Establishment of the Macau Special Administrative Region of the People's Republic of China." He delivered an important speech, emphasizing that Macau's progress and achievements are inseparable from the comprehensive and correct implementation of the " One Country, Two Systems " principle and the Basic Law of the Macau Special Administrative Region. In his speech, Xi Jinping used his afternoon visit to two families in the Seac Pai Van public housing estate as a starting point, noting that these ordinary families hoped for a better tomorrow, and he felt their love for life. Visiting their homes was like opening a window to Macau, allowing him to see Macau's gratifying achievements and feel the harmonious atmosphere of Macau, a small town full of stories, joy, and happiness. In his speech, he stressed that Macau's progress and achievements are inseparable from the comprehensive and correct implementation of the "One Country, Two Systems" principle and the Basic Law of the Macau Special Administrative Region, from the concerted efforts and hard work of the SAR government and the people of Macau, and from the strong support of the central government and the people of all ethnic groups across the country. These progress and achievements fully demonstrate the powerful vitality of the great concept of "One Country, Two Systems." Xi Jinping continued, "How to achieve better development of Macau on the basis of the past 15 years of construction and maintain Macau's long-term prosperity and stability is a major issue facing Macau's development in the current and future period. He encouraged Macau people to strengthen their confidence and add strength from the progress and achievements made in development, and to be clear about the new changes in the internal and external environment and to be good at overall planning. He also hoped that Macau compatriots would adhere to the overall interests of the country and the long-term interests of Macau, support the Chief Executive and the government in governing according to law, and continuously create a new situation for the cause of "one country, two systems". Xi Jinping pointed out that at present, the mainland of China is in an important period of building a moderately prosperous society in all respects, deepening reform in all respects, and advancing the rule of law in all respects, which provides great opportunities and broad space for Macau's development. Opportunities should not be missed. Macau compatriots should give full play to the institutional advantages of "one country, two systems", be good at seizing opportunities from the general trend of China's development, better take advantage of the rapid development of China's reform and development, and solidly promote the sustained and healthy development of Macau's economy and society.

At 8 p.m., Xi Jinping attended the “Artistic Evening to Celebrate the 15th Anniversary of Macau’s Return to the Motherland”. The evening was hosted by the Macau Special Administrative Region Government and organized by the Cultural Affairs Bureau. The theme was “Macau Dream, Chinese Heart”. The performance presented Macau's remarkable achievements since its return to China and expressed the firm belief and good wishes of all Macau citizens for the future. The performance took the growth, dreaming and pursuing of a young couple in Macau as the axis, connecting famous buildings, cultural features and festivals with special symbolic significance in different eras of Macau. Through local singers, art groups and folk groups, the performance was presented with music, singing, dance, magic and martial arts. The wonderful and diverse stage performances allowed guests and audiences to witness the pursuit, realization and aspiration of the “Macau Dream”. At the end of the performance, Xi Jinping, accompanied by Chief Executive Chui Sai On, went on stage to meet the performers and sang Ode to the Motherland with the audience. The one-hour artistic evening ended with the song.

=== 20 December ===
At 10:00 a.m., the celebration of the 15th anniversary of Macau's return to China and the inauguration ceremony of the fourth government of the Macau Special Administrative Region were held at the Macau East Asian Games Dome. Chief Executive Chui Sai On took the oath under the supervision of Xi Jinping and in his " Chui-style Mandarin ". Subsequently, the principal officials, the Prosecutor General and members of the Executive Council also took the oath of office. In his speech, Xi Jinping put forward four hopes for Macau's long-term prosperity and stability: continue to work hard and improve the SAR's ability and level of governance according to law; continue to make overall plans and actively promote Macau to take the path of moderately diversified and sustainable economic development; continue to consolidate the foundation and strive to promote social harmony and stability; continue to look to the future and strengthen the education and training of young people.

Xi Jinping then met with the heads of the central government agencies stationed in Macau and the heads of major Chinese-funded institutions. Xi Jinping said that in the 15 years since Macau returned to China, the "one country, two systems" policy and the Basic Law have been well implemented, and various undertakings have made gratifying progress and maintained a prosperous and stable overall situation. This is inseparable from the hard work and deep cultivation of the central government agencies stationed in Macau and Chinese-funded enterprises. On behalf of the CCP Central Committee, the State Council and the Central Military Commission, he extended his sincere greetings to everyone. Xi Jinping pointed out that everyone works in the Macau Special Administrative Region and is at the forefront of the "one country, two systems" cause. The mission is glorious, the task is arduous and the responsibility is heavy. We must enhance our awareness of the overall situation and the sense of crisis, strengthen theoretical study, deeply grasp the overall requirements of the central government for Hong Kong and Macau work, continuously strengthen our own construction, move people with genuine feelings, inspire people with personal charm, and influence people with knowledge and cultivation, so as to promote the great unity of people from all walks of life in Macau under the banner of loving the country and loving Macau. Xi Jinping emphasized that we must always maintain firm confidence in the development of the Party and the country and in the cause of "one country, two systems", and turn this confidence into the driving force for carrying out specific work.

In the afternoon, Xi Jinping and his entourage visited the new campus of the University of Macau and toured the residential colleges, interacting with students. Xi Jinping first viewed the model and listened to the introduction by the then-President Zhao Wei. The President first talked about the overall planning, history and educational philosophy of the University of Macau, and then gave a special introduction to the scientific research achievements of the State Key Laboratory of Analog and Mixed-Signal VLSI and the State Key Laboratory of Quality Research in Chinese Medicine. Finally, he introduced the rare ancient books in the University of Macau Library to Xi Jinping. Afterwards, Xi Jinping and his entourage visited one of the residential colleges, Cheng Yu Tung College, where they were greeted by Cheng Haidong, Vice President of the University of Macau, and Zhong Ling, Dean of the college. Xi Jinping listened to their introduction of the college system and facilities. While passing through the discussion room, there was a discussion held by 16 local students and 4 mainland students on the theme of "Traditional Chinese Culture and Contemporary Youth". Xi Jinping also participated in the discussion, interacting with the students and talking about the influence of Chinese culture on Macau. Finally, Xi Jinping donated a batch of books to the University of Macau.

In addition, accompanied by Mrs. Huo Huifen, wife of Cui Shi'an, Xi Jinping's wife Peng Liyuan visited the Zheng Family Mansion, a century-old mansion with a combination of Chinese and Western architectural features. In front of the model of the Zheng Family Mansion, the old wooden beams, and the distinctive shell windows, Peng Liyuan stopped from time to time to look carefully and learn about its history, repair, and protection. Seeing that the ancient buildings of the Zheng Family Mansion were well protected, she expressed her approval. Peng Liyuan enjoyed the national intangible cultural heritage "Nanyin storytelling" in the Zheng Family Mansion and praised the artists' superb performance. She also learned with great interest about the differences between Macau Nanyin and other Nanyin, and expressed her hope that the old artists would teach more young students to pass on Chinese culture well.

Xi Jinping then concluded his various activities in Macau and returned to Beijing by special plane at Macau International Airport. Subsequently, Li Gang, then director of the Liaison Office of the Central People's Government in Macau, summarized Xi Jinping's trip to the media and pointed out that Xi Jinping's series of speeches fully expressed the central government's firm support for Macau and its confidence in Macau's future development, and demonstrated the central government's expectations for the SAR's governing team and all sectors of society. He believed that it would definitely add new impetus to Macau's development, and summarized Xi Jinping's series of speeches during his stay in Macau from five aspects.
