= Ode to the Motherland =

Patriotic song from the People's Republic of China

Song
- Written: 1950; 76 years ago
- Genre: March
- Composer: Wang Shen

"Ode to the Motherland" (simplified Chinese: 歌唱祖国; traditional Chinese: 歌唱祖國; pinyin: Gēchàng Zǔguó) is a patriotic song of the People's Republic of China, written and music composed by Wang Shen (王莘; Wáng Shēn; 26 October 1918–15 October 2007) during the period immediately after the founding of the People's Republic of China (1949–1951). It is sometimes honoured as "the second national anthem" of the PRC. The song has been performed in major sporting events in the opening ceremonies during China's entry in the parade of nations, such as the 2008 Summer Olympics (which was also the subject of a lip-synching scandal), the 2019 Military World Games, the 2021 Summer World University Games as well as the 2022 Winter Olympics and 2022 Asian Games.

During the Cultural Revolution, its name was Ode to the Socialist Motherland and the lyrics heavily referenced communism and praise of Mao Zedong.

It is the opening music of the radio programmes News and Newspapers Summary (新闻和报纸摘要) and National Network News (全国新闻联播) on China National Radio. Also, it is the closing music of some of CNR's radio channels.

== Origin ==
Wang Shen, a musician from the nearby city of Tianjin, started writing this song in late September 1950, shortly after he saw the sea of fluttering Chinese flags at Tiananmen Square during the preparation period for the first National Day of the People's Republic of China, which was to be held on 1 October that year. The song had become very popular firstly in Tianjin, then spreading to Beijing. The song's lyrics and its music composition were officially published on 15 September 1951 in the People's Daily, being promoted widely by the Ministry of Culture of China in time for the National Day festivities.

== See also ==
- List of socialist songs
- Historical Chinese anthems
- Socialist music from China
  - "National Flag Anthem of the Republic of China"
  - "Socialism is Good"
  - "Sailing the Seas Depends on the Helmsman"
  - "The East Is Red"
  - "Without the Communist Party, There Would Be No New China"
