= Sailing the Seas Depends on the Helmsman =

1964 Chinese revolutionary song

"Sailing the Seas Depends on the Helmsman" (Chinese: 大海航行靠舵手; pinyin: Dàhǎi hángxíng kào duòshǒu), sometimes known as "The Helmsman Sets the Ocean Course", is the English-language title of a popular Chinese Communist Party (CCP) revolutionary song which was composed by Wang Shuangyin (王双印) in 1964, with lyrics written by Yu Wen (郁文). This song was commonly sung by the public, especially Red Guards during the Cultural Revolution (1966–1976) in praise of Mao Zedong Thought and the CCP. Like many revolutionary songs, the single verse of "Sailing the Seas Depends on the Helmsman" was most often sung repeatedly.

The song's title, which forms the main verse, is based on a slogan from the military leader Lin Biao, according to Premier Zhou Enlai.

The composition of "Sailing the Seas Depends on the Helmsman" closely resembles the first four lines of "I Dedicate Oil to My Motherland" (我为祖国献石油), an earlier song composed by Qin Yongcheng with lyrics by Xue Zhuguo. Due to concerns of plagiarism, Wang Shuangyin personally apologized to Qin Yongcheng.

== See also ==
- Political music in China
- List of socialist songs
- Socialist music from China:
  - "March of the Volunteers"
  - "Socialism is Good"
  - "Ode to the Motherland"
  - "The East Is Red"
  - "Without the Communist Party, There Would Be No New China"
