= News and Newspapers Summary =

- 新闻和报纸摘要
- Genre: News
- Theme music composer: Wang Shen
- Opening theme: Ode to the Motherland
- Original languages: Mandarin; Uyghur; Standard Tibetan

Production
- Production location: China
- Running time: 30 minutes
- Production company: CNR News Radio

Original release
- Network: CNR News Radio; CNR Business Radio; CNR Countryside Radio
- Release: 10 April 1951 – present

"News and Newspaper Digest" (Chinese: 新闻和报纸摘要; pinyin: Xīnwén hé Bàozhǐ Zhāiyào, IPA pronunciation:[ɕín.wə̌n.xɤ̌.pâʊ.ʈʂɻ̩̀.ʈʂáɪ.jǎʊ]) is the China National Radio's daily morning news programme, also the station's oldest, most influential, highest standing broadcasts. Having a greater influence in mainland China. According to the official introduction of the China National Radio, listeners, the program always ranked list of all programs all stations, has a broad, long-term and fixed audiences. It is usually broadcast live over CNR News Radio and CNR Countryside Radio from Beijing Time 6:30-7:00 a.m. every day. It also simulcasts on the flagship services of the local radio stations in China. The programme reruns on CNR Business Radio at 7:00 am every day.

== History ==
- April 10, 1950, the first prototype of "News and Newspapers Digest" program, "Capital Newspaper Summary" (Chinese: 首都报纸摘要; pinyin: shǒudū bàozhǐ zhāiyào, IPA pronunciation [ʂòʊ.tú.pâʊ.ʈʂɻ̩̀.ʈʂáɪ.jǎʊ]) program launched.
- In 1954, the "Ode to the Motherland" as the start music.
- April 4, 1955, "The Central Newspapers Summary" (Chinese: 中央报纸摘要; pinyin: zhōngyāng bàozhǐ zhāiyào, IPA pronunciation [ʈʂʊ́ŋ.jáŋ.pâʊ.ʈʂɻ̩̀.ʈʂáɪ.jǎʊ]) the name of the launch.
- July 4, 1955, "The Central Newspaper Summary" program was renamed "News and Newspapers Digest"l
- 1967, the "News and Newspaper Digest" name is fixed.
- November 1, 2008, live broadcast of the "News and Newspapers Digest" program begins (live briefly in 1981 before).

== News anchors ==
Yu Fang, Zhong Cheng, Fang Liang, Zheng Lan, Wei Dong, Chen Liang, Zhi Peng, Wang Yi, Wan Ying

== Ident ==
The theme music of "News and Newspapers Digest" is Ode to the Motherland, a well-known Chinese patriotic song, with an announcer's voice "(This is) China National Radio, now it's the time for News and Newspapers Summary (Chinese: 中央人民广播电台，现在是新闻和报纸摘要节目时间; pinyin: Zhōngyāng Rénmín Guǎngbō Diàntái, xiànzài shì Xīnwén hé Bàozhǐ Zhāiyào jiému shíjiān and IPA Pronunciation:[ʈʂʊ́ŋjáŋɻə̌nmǐnkwàŋpwótjɛ̂ntʰǎɪ],[ɕjɛ̂ntsâɪʂɻ̩̂ɕínwə̌nxɤ̌pâʊʈʂɻ̩̀ʈʂǎɪjâʊtɕjěmûʂɻ̩̌tɕjɛ́n]).
