= Honglaowai =

American internet celebrity

- Years active: November 7, 2007 – August 2008

Chinese name
- Simplified Chinese: 红老外
- Traditional Chinese: 紅老外
- Literal meaning: red foreigner
Transcriptions
Standard Mandarin
- Hanyu Pinyin: Hóng Lǎowài

Honglaowai (Chinese: 红老外; lit. 'red foreigner'), also known as Red Laowai, is an internet celebrity popular in China and within overseas Chinese communities. He quickly became famous as a Caucasian American singing Chinese patriotic songs in videos that he uploaded to numerous Chinese video-sharing sites like Tudou, Youku, and 56. Frequently featured on the front page of these sites, and attracting millions of views, he drew the attention of the media in mainland China, Hong Kong, Taiwan, the Americas, and Europe. He has given multiple interviews to newspapers and television stations and is a topic of discussion by the media.

== Videos ==
Honglaowai's first video, singing "Without the Communist Party, There Would Be No New China" (没有共产党就没有新中国), was uploaded to several video-sharing websites on November 7, 2007, as a celebration of the 90th anniversary of the October Revolution. It featured Honglaowai singing topless against a white wall with a photo of Mao Zedong. In the following two weeks, he released three more videos that featured similar setups and in which he sang "The East Is Red" (东方红), "My Chinese Heart" (我的中国心), and "March of the People's Liberation Army" (中国人民解放军军歌).

== Popular perception ==
Despite the controversies that Honglaowai has created, he remains popular with the public in China. The media has described his audience as thinking of him as "cute" and "handsome". His fans have set up several fan websites and pages dedicated to him.

== Clothing controversy ==
Because Honglaowai was not wearing a shirt in his first several videos, this caused a controversy among China's online community and China's media. Several newspaper articles questioned whether his singing of traditional communist songs were meant as an insult to the Chinese government or as art. People's Daily, the official newspaper of the Central Committee of the Chinese Communist Party, initially called for the screening of websites that show Honglaowai's videos. Several online polls also appeared asking whether Honglaowai was offensive to China.

In his blog entry dated November 20, 2007, he explained that his intention had not been to insult China. "True communists say that it is not clothes, but ideas that are the most important!", he stated. In his subsequent videos, he was no longer seen shirtless.

He made cover versions of patriotic and Communist Chinese songs, songs by Taiwanese stars Jay Chou and Jolin Tsai, and others. His video "Injury of Ceasefire" (止战之殇), an anti-war rap song originally performed by Jay Chou, has been seen more than 4 million times on the Chinese video-sharing sites.

== Personal life ==
The Honglaowai pseudonym was created by George Costow, a 30-year-old Wall Street investment banker, graduate of Princeton University, and resident of the Chelsea neighborhood of New York City. His videos often feature buildings and streets situated in New York, such as the World Trade Center site.

On his blog, and in his interviews, he states that he has learned Chinese by himself, and that he had not been to mainland China yet. Honglaowai announced on his blog that he would visit mainland China for the first time on June 13, 2008. He was interviewed by Youku a week after arriving and performed a Cultural Revolution "Loyal to Mao" dance on Nanjing Road in Shanghai.

After the closing of Lehman Brothers, Costow discontinued his Sina blog.

== See also ==
- YouTube celebrities
- Back Dorm Boys
- Sister Furong
- Papi Jiang
