= National Day of the People's Republic of China =

Public holiday in China

National Day of the People's Republic of China 中华人民共和国国庆节
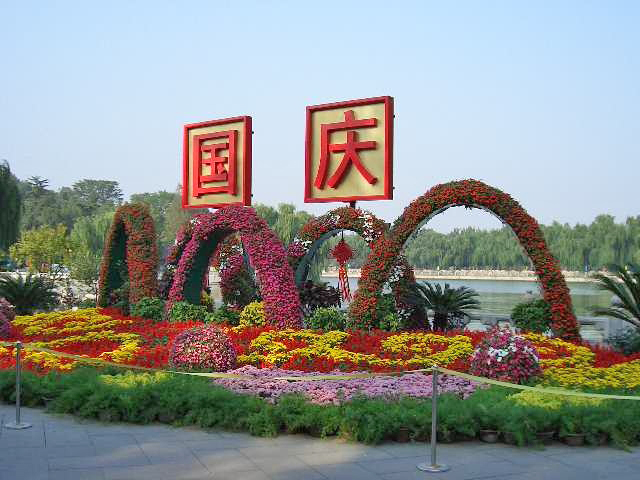
- Flower garden at Beihai Park in 2004. The signboards read 国庆 (guóqìng; 'national celebration')
- Also called: China Day, China's birthday, PRC Day, 10–1
- Observed by: People's Republic of China, including Hong Kong and Macau
- Type: Historical, cultural, nationalist
- Significance: The day of the proclamation of the People's Republic of China in 1949
- Celebrations: Festivities, including fireworks and concerts (a grand military parade every 10 years)
- Date: 1 October
- Next time: 1 October 2027
- Frequency: Annual
- First time: 1 October 1949

Chinese name
- Simplified Chinese: 国庆节
- Traditional Chinese: 國慶節
- Literal meaning: national celebration holiday
Transcriptions
Standard Mandarin
- Hanyu Pinyin: guóqìng jié
- Gwoyeu Romatzyh: gwochinq jye
- Wade–Giles: kuo^{2}-chʻing^{4} chieh^{2}
- IPA: [kwǒ.tɕʰîŋ tɕjě]
Wu
- Suzhounese: kueq^{7} chin^{5} tsiq^{7}
Yue: Cantonese
- Yale Romanization: gwok-hing jit
- Jyutping: gwok3-hing3 zit3
Southern Min
- Tâi-lô: kok-khìng tsueh

Portuguese name
- Portuguese: Dia Nacional da República Popular da China

National Day (Chinese: 国庆节; pinyin: guóqìng jié; lit. 'national celebration day'), officially the National Day of the People's Republic of China (中华人民共和国国庆节), is a public holiday in China celebrated annually on 1 October as the national day of the People's Republic of China, commemorating Mao Zedong's formal proclamation of the establishment of the People's Republic of China on 1 October 1949. The Chinese Communist Party victory in the Chinese Civil War resulted in the People's Republic of China succeeding the Republic of China's rule over mainland China, leaving the Republic of China only in control of Taiwan and its adjacent islands.

Although it is observed on 1 October, another six days are added to the official holiday, normally in lieu of the two weekend breaks around 1 October, making it a de facto public holiday comprising seven consecutive days also known as Golden Week with specifics regulated by the State Council. Festivities and concerts are usually held nationwide on this day, with a grand military parade and mass pageant event held on select years. (Note: Since the founding of the people's republic to 2009, the country has held 14 National Day grand military parades in 1949–1959, 1984, 1999, and 2009.) The parade held on 1 October 2019 marked the 70th anniversary of the People's Republic of China.

== History ==
The Chinese Communist Party (CCP) defeated the incumbent Kuomintang (KMT) nationalist government of the Republic of China in the Chinese Civil War that took place from 1927 to 1950 except for a brief alliance against Japan in the Second Sino-Japanese War. In its aftermath, the nationalist government withdrew to the island of Taiwan, previously a prefecture of the Qing Empire that was ceded to Japan under its colonial rule from 1895 to 1945.

The People's Republic of China was founded on 1 October 1949, with a ceremony celebrating the forming of the Central People's Government taking place in Tiananmen Square in its new national capital of Peking (previously Peiping) on the same day that year. The first public parade of the new People's Liberation Army took place there, following the address by the first CCP Chairman Mao Zedong officially declaring the formal establishment of the Republic.

After the Founding Ceremony, Ma Xulun, the Minister of Education and Chairman of the Central Committee of the China Association for Promoting Democracy, believed that China should establish its own National Day. He drafted a proposal entitled "Suggesting October 1 as the National Day", which he intended to present to the forthcoming first session of the 1st National Committee of the Chinese People's Political Consultative Conference.

On 9 October 1949, the meeting was held at the Qinzheng Hall in Zhongnanhai, where Ma Xulun, due to illness, had his proposal conveyed by Xu Guangping. The Secretary General of the Central People's Government, Lin Boqu, spoke in favor of the proposal, and Mao Zedong also expressed his support. Finally, the meeting unanimously adopted the proposal and made a resolution "Requesting the Government to designate October 1 as the National Day of the People's Republic of China to replace the old National Day of October 10", which was sent to the Central People's Government for adoption and implementation.

On 2 December 1949, the Fourth Session of the Central People's Government Committee (Chinese: 中央人民政府委员会) adopted the Resolution on the National Day of the People's Republic of China, which proclaimed that since 1950, 1 October of each year, the day on which the People's Republic of China was proclaimed, would be the National Day of the People's Republic of China.

On 23 December 1949, the Twelfth Political Affairs Conference of the State Council of the Central People's Government (Chinese: 中央人民政府政务院) passed the Measures for National Holidays on Annual and Memorial Days, stipulating that National Day should be a national holiday for all the people as 1 and 2 October. On 1 October 1950, the first National Day celebrations were held in Tiananmen Square.

In September 1960, the Central Committee of the Chinese Communist Party and the State Council implemented the policy of "practicing economy and frugality to build up the country", and reformed the system of National Day ceremonies by implementing "one small celebration in five years and one big parade in ten years". In 1984, based on paramount leader Deng Xiaoping's proposal, the Central Committee decided to hold a large National Day parade on the 35th anniversary of the National Day in that year. In 1999, the Central Committee decided to hold a military parade for the 50th anniversary of the People's Republic of China, and a large-scale military parade was held on 1 October of the same year in Tiananmen Square. In 2009, a large military parade was held on the 60th anniversary of the People's Republic of China on the National Day. In 2019, a grand celebration of the 70th anniversary of the People's Republic of China was held in Beijing on the National Day.

== National celebrations ==
National Day marks the start of a Golden Week, a weeklong public holiday.

The day is celebrated throughout mainland China, Hong Kong, and Macau with a variety of government-organized festivities, including fireworks and concerts, as well as sports events and cultural events. Public places, such as Tiananmen Square in Beijing, are decorated in a festive theme. Portraits of revered leaders, such as Mao Zedong, are publicly displayed. The holiday is also celebrated by many overseas Chinese.

=== Wreath-laying ceremony at the Monument to the People's Heroes ===
From 2004 to 2013, a national wreath-laying ceremony was held on National Day in Tiananmen Square following the flag raising ceremony on years with no parades. The ceremony was centered on the Monument to the People's Heroes, built in 1958 in remembrance of the millions of Chinese who perished during the long years of national struggle. Beginning in 2014, they have been held on a new holiday, Martyrs' Day, set on the eve of National Day, 30 September, and is presided by the paramount leader and other party and state leaders.

=== National flag-raising ceremony ===
For many years, a flag-raising ceremony has been held at Tiananmen Square in the morning of the day if no parade is scheduled on the day. The 6 a.m. National Day flag-raising ceremony is important in years without any anniversary parades. Held at the Tiananmen Square, since 2017 the Beijing Garrison Honor Guard Battalion's Color Guard Company is present for the ceremony with the National Marching Band of the PLA. Until 2016 the Beijing People's Armed Police units provided men for the ceremonial color guard unit. The ceremony is open to the public and tourists and is widely televised and streamed online for viewers at home and abroad. At the end of the ceremony, doves and colorful balloons are released.

=== National civil-military parade ===
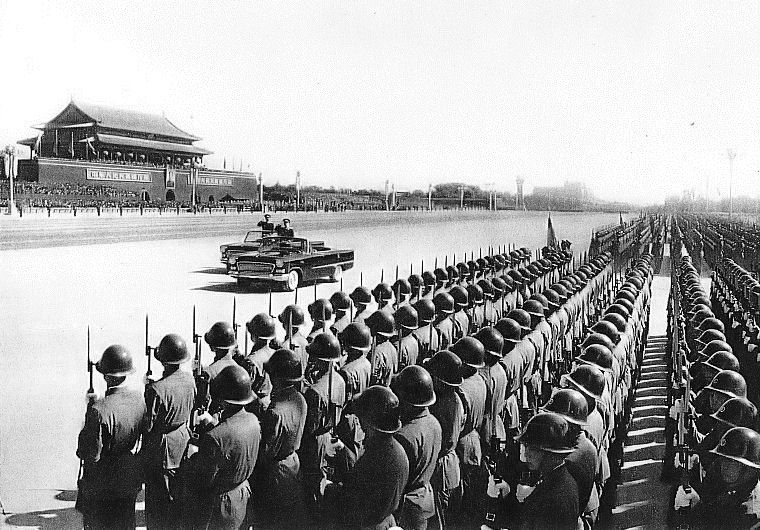
Marshal Lin Biao surveying the soldiers during the 10th anniversary military parade in 1959.

The special civil-military parade of the People's Liberation Army, People's Armed Police and the Militia together with representatives of the people of all walks of life including the Young Pioneers of China is held on special years in the morning of National Day itself. It has been televised on China Central Television since 1984 (and broadcast around the world from that year as well via satellite and cable television), is a key highlight of the national celebrations in Beijing. The parade was annual from 1950 to 1959 and terminated until 1984. There was a parade planned for 1989 but was cancelled following the 4 June crackdown. Parades were held again in 1999 and 2009.

The parade is overseen by the paramount leader as well as other top leadership.

== Gallery ==
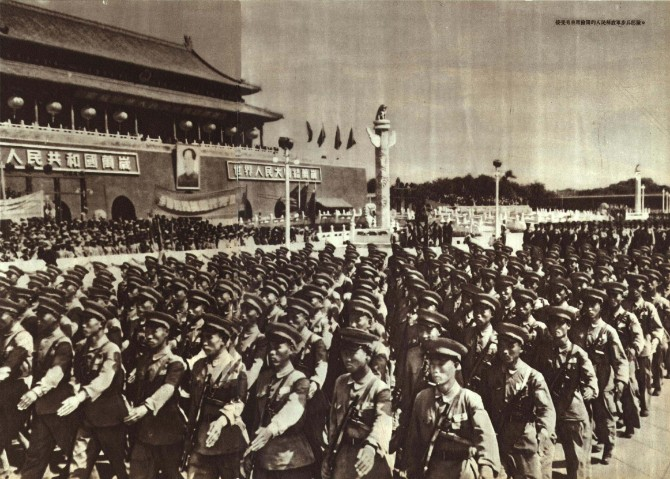
National Day in 1950

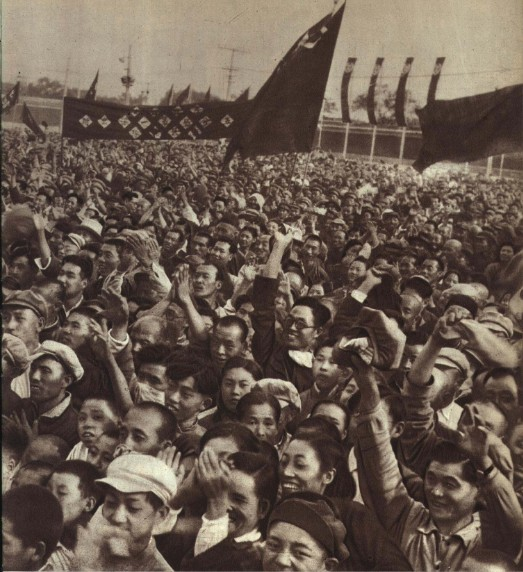
National Day in 1950

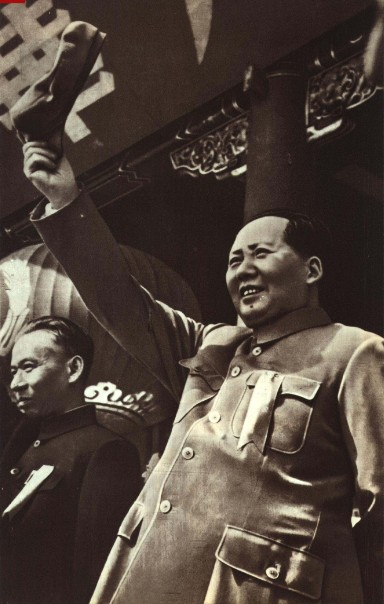
Mao Zedong and Liu Shaoqi gestured to the crowd on National Day 1950

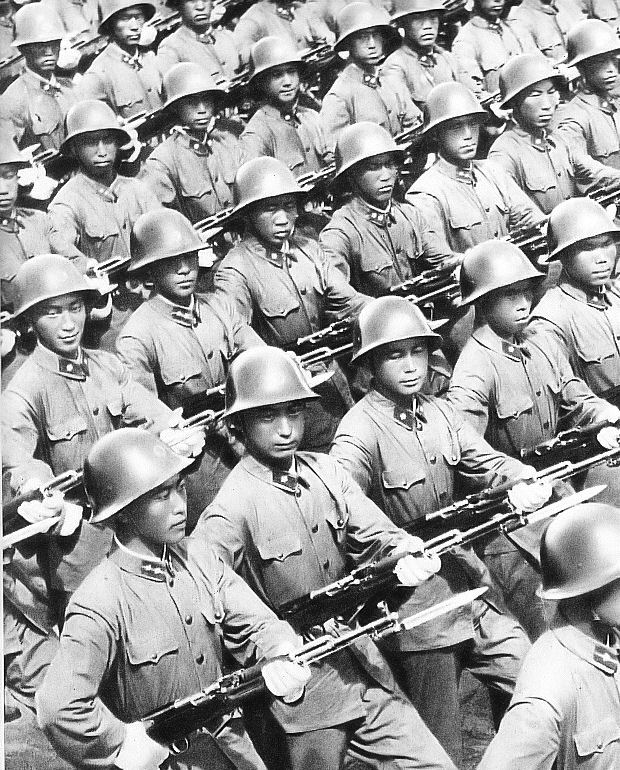
The 10th anniversary of the People's Republic of China in 1959

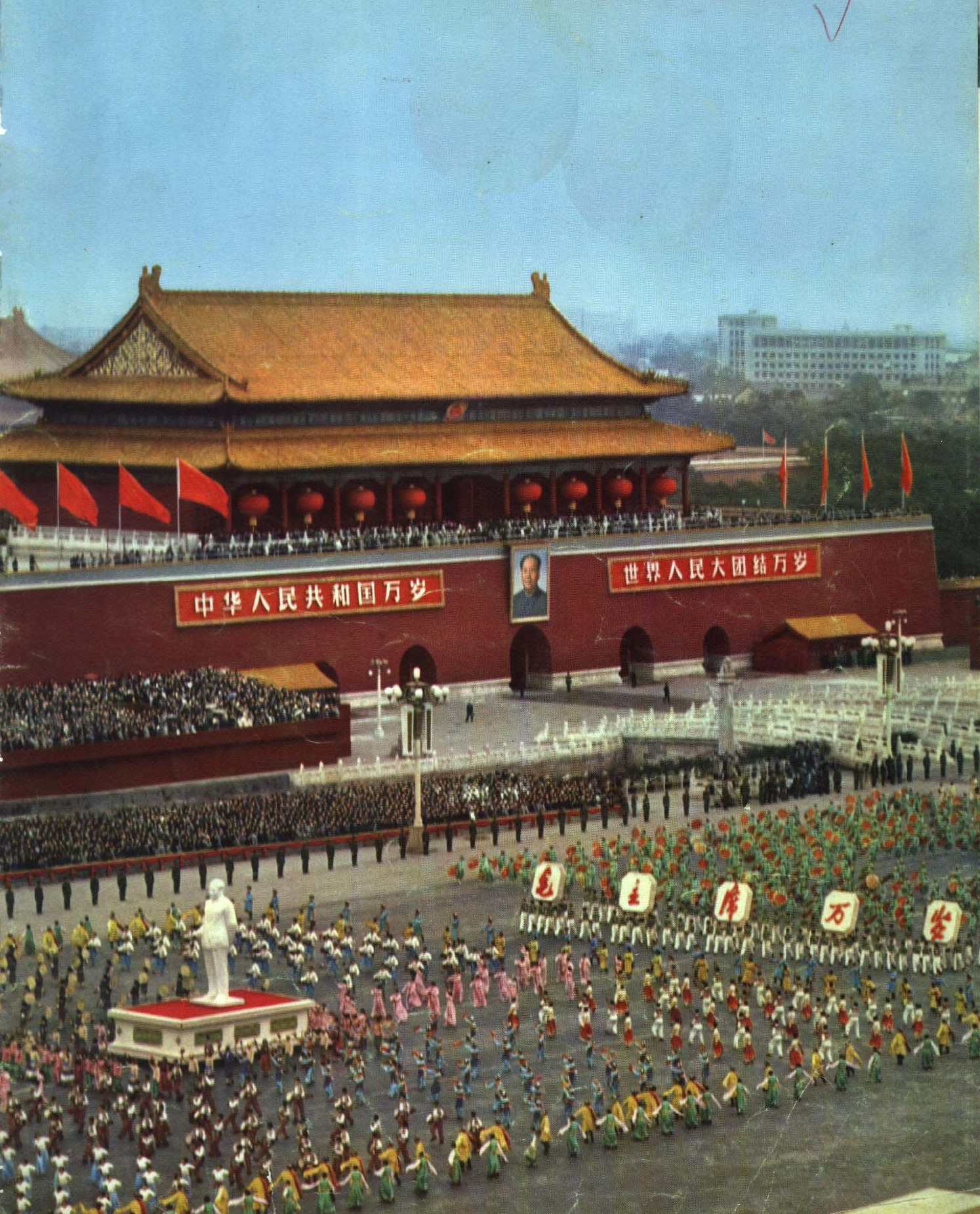
The 15th anniversary of the National Day of the People's Republic of China in 1964

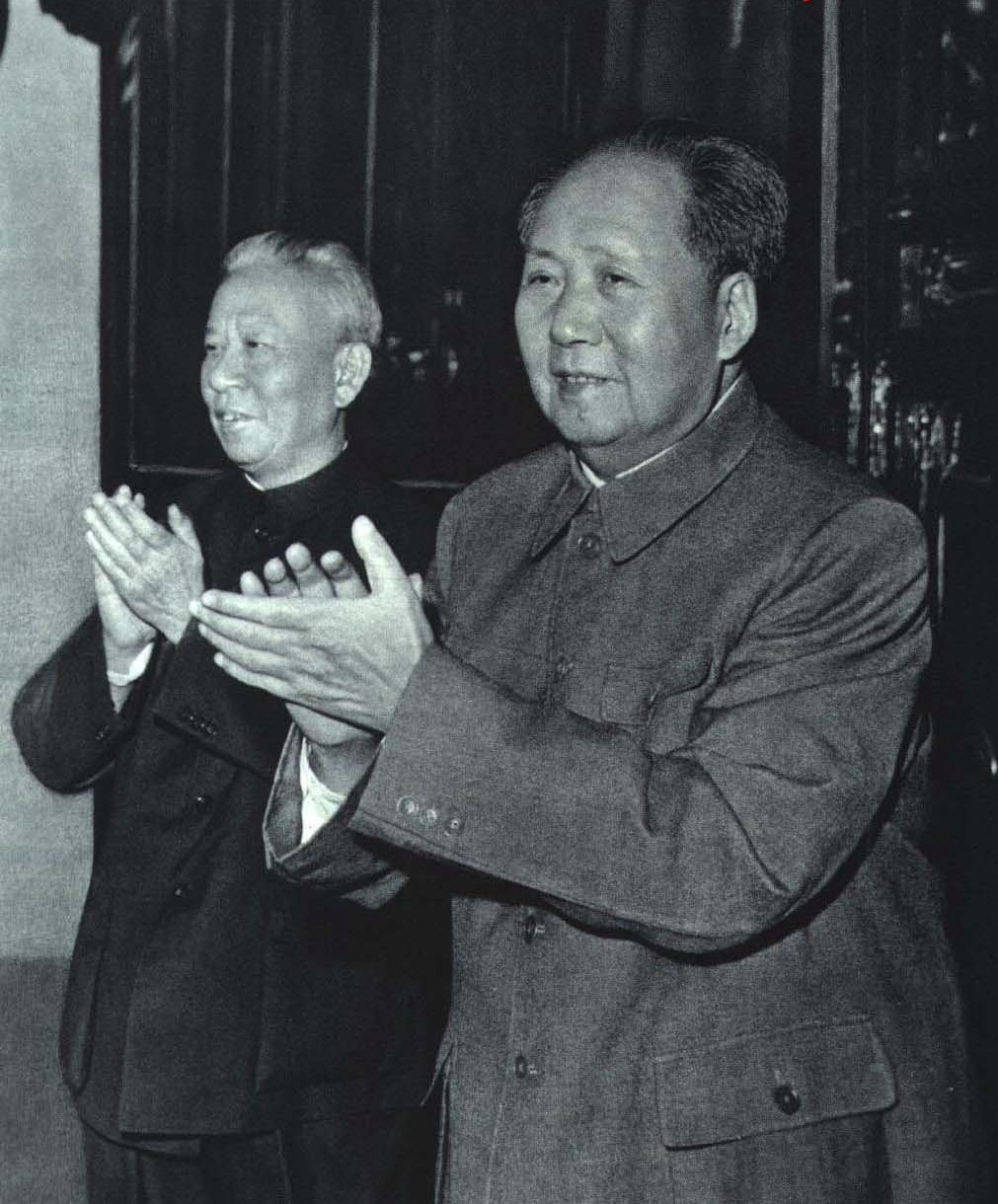
Chairman Mao Zedong and President Liu Shaoqi on the 15th Anniversary of the National Day of the People's Republic of China in 1964

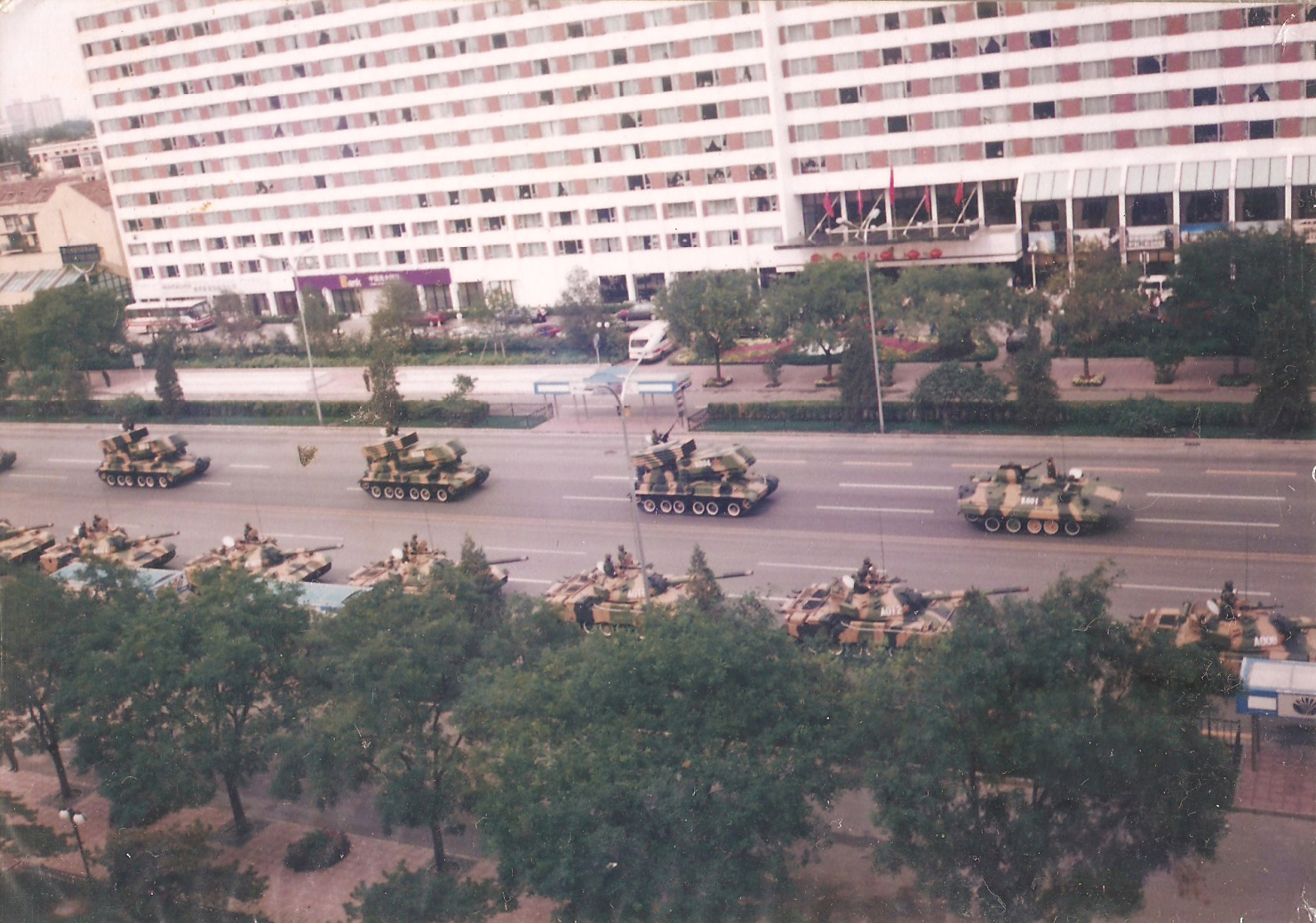
The 50th anniversary of the People's Republic of China in 1999

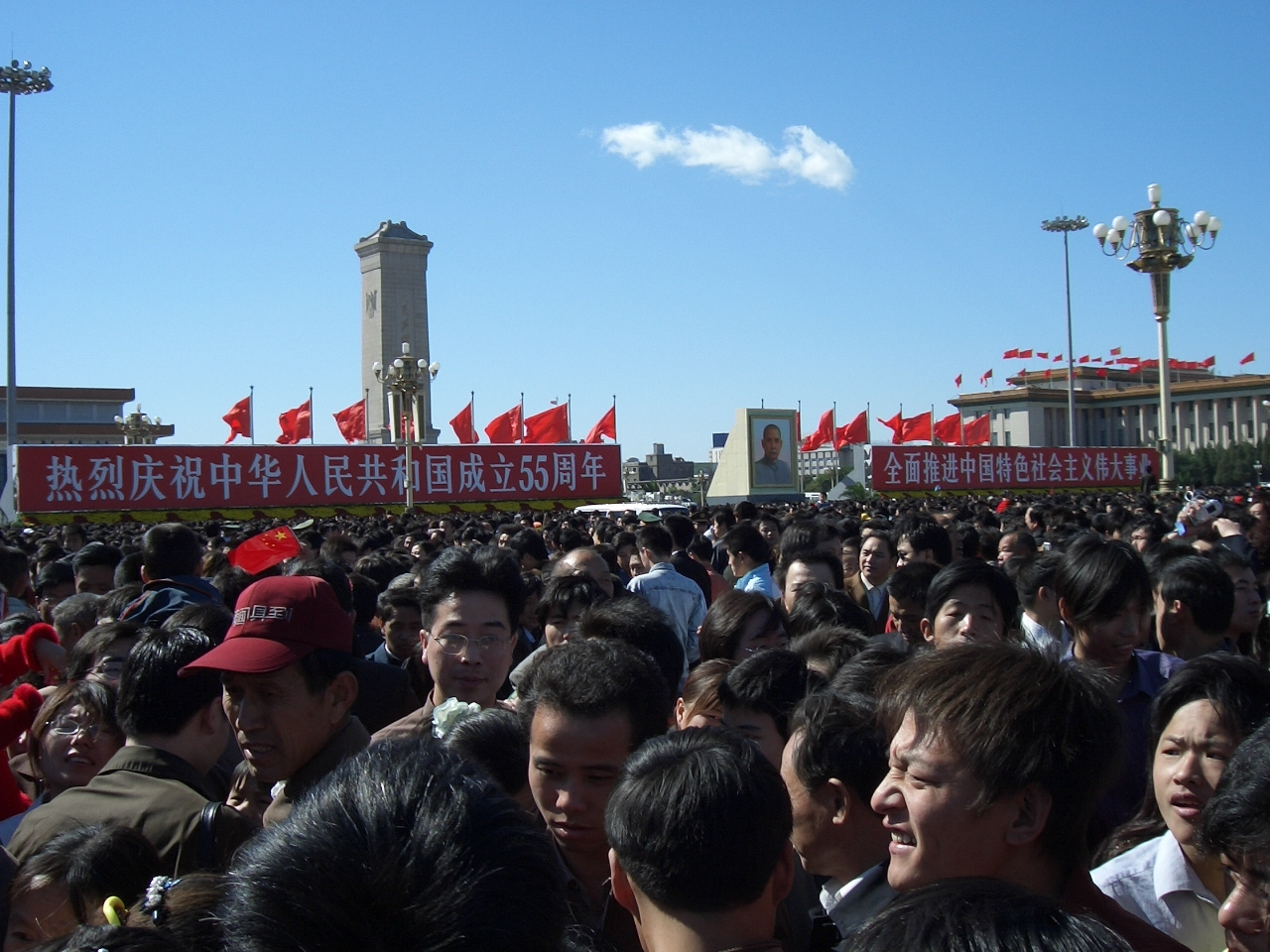
2004 National Day celebration in Tiananmen Square, Beijing

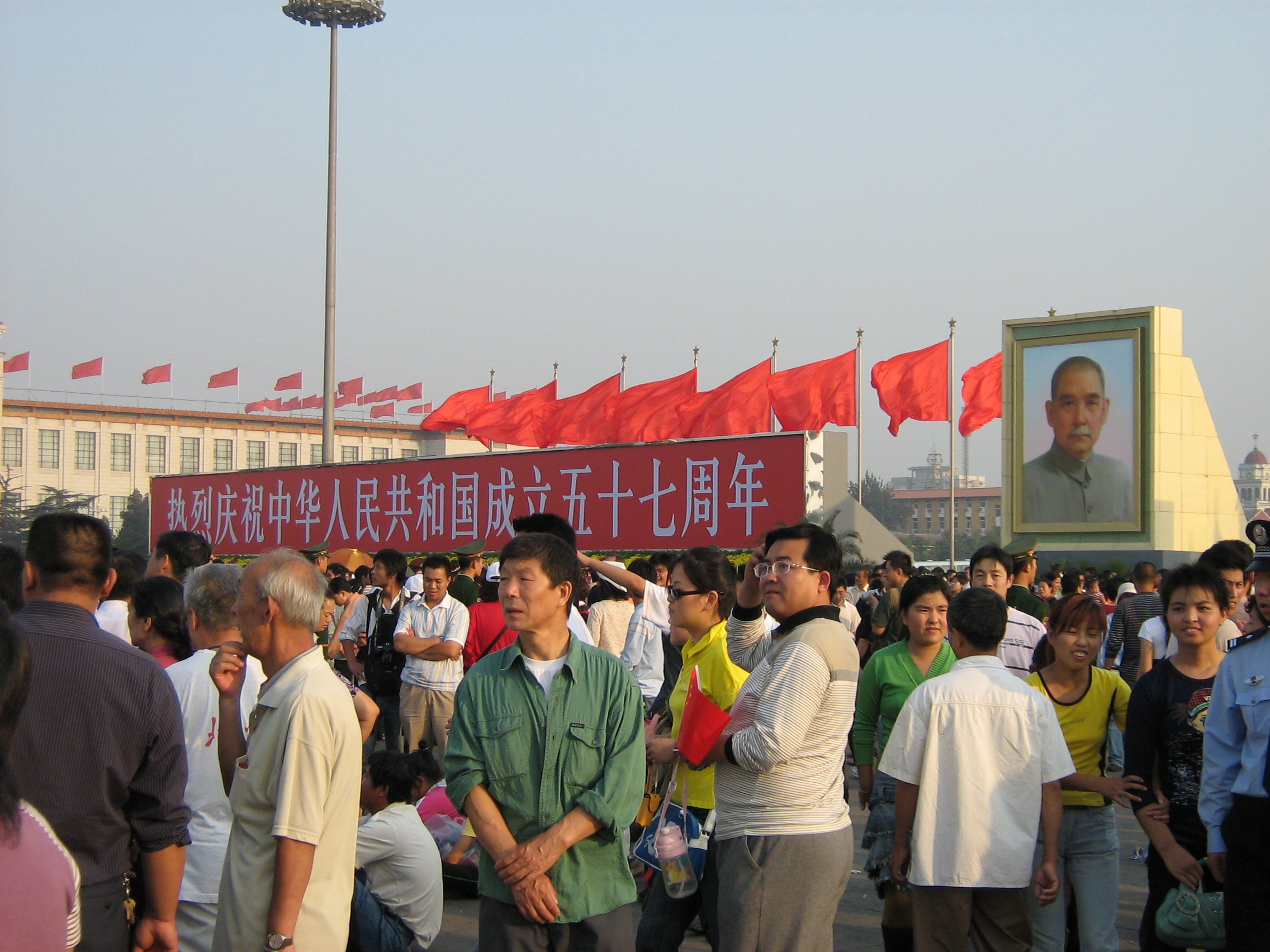
Tiananmen Square, 2006 National Day of the PRC. The placard reads "Warmly celebrate the 57th anniversary of the founding of the People's Republic of China". The portrait is that of Sun Yat-sen.

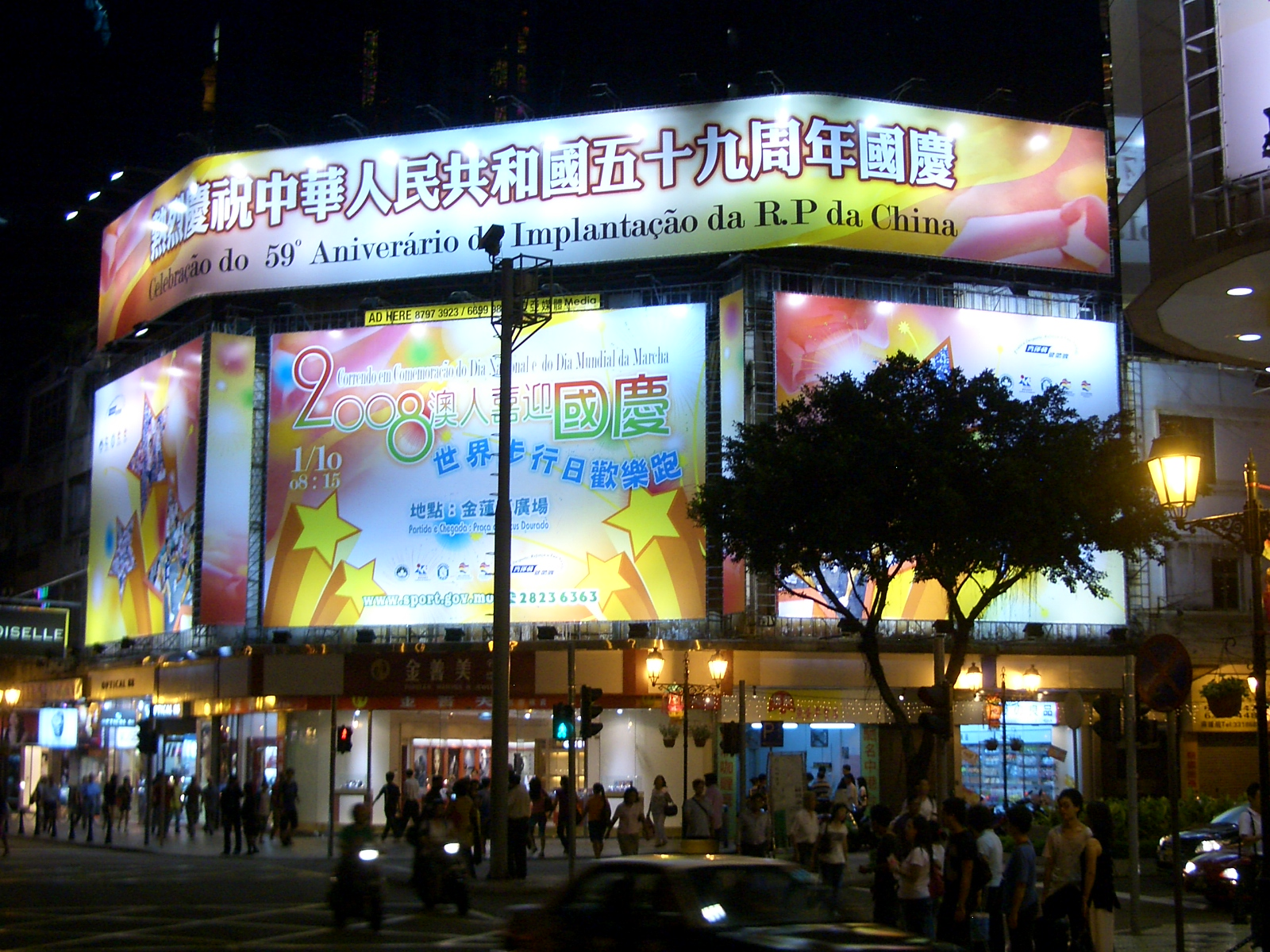
2008 National Day celebration in Macau

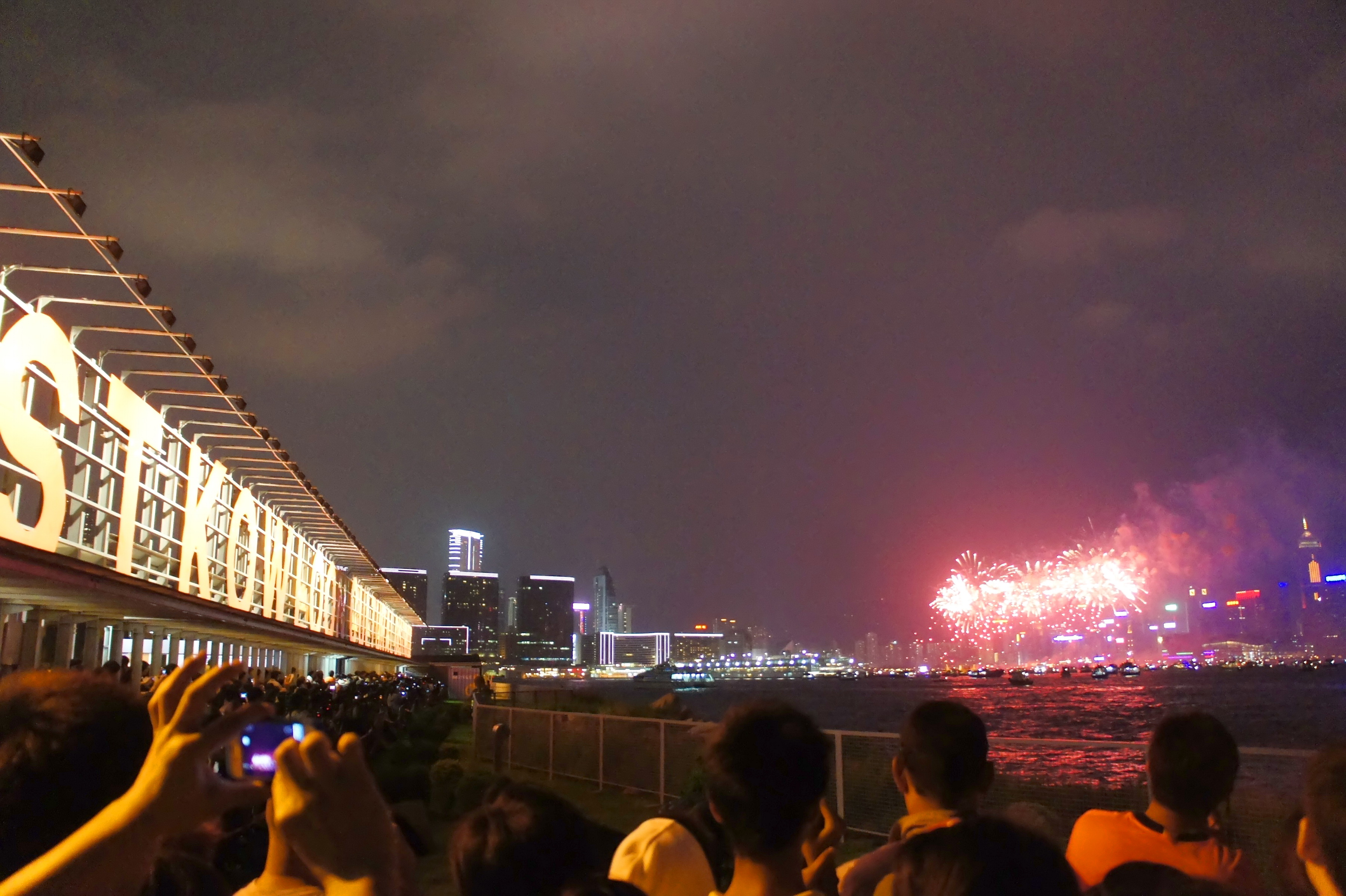
2012 National Day celebration in Hong Kong

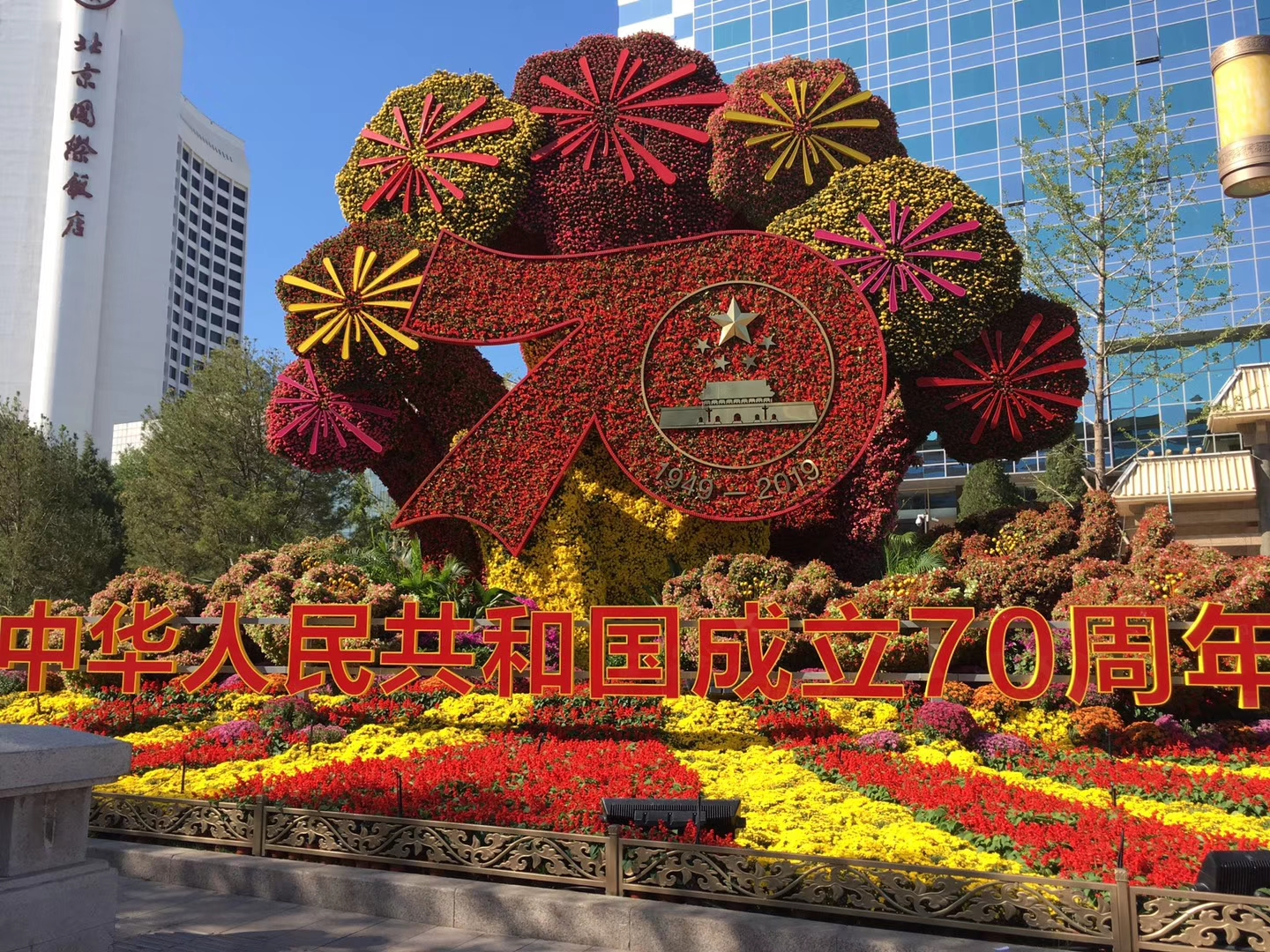
Flower bed for celebrating the 70th National Day on Jianguomennei Street

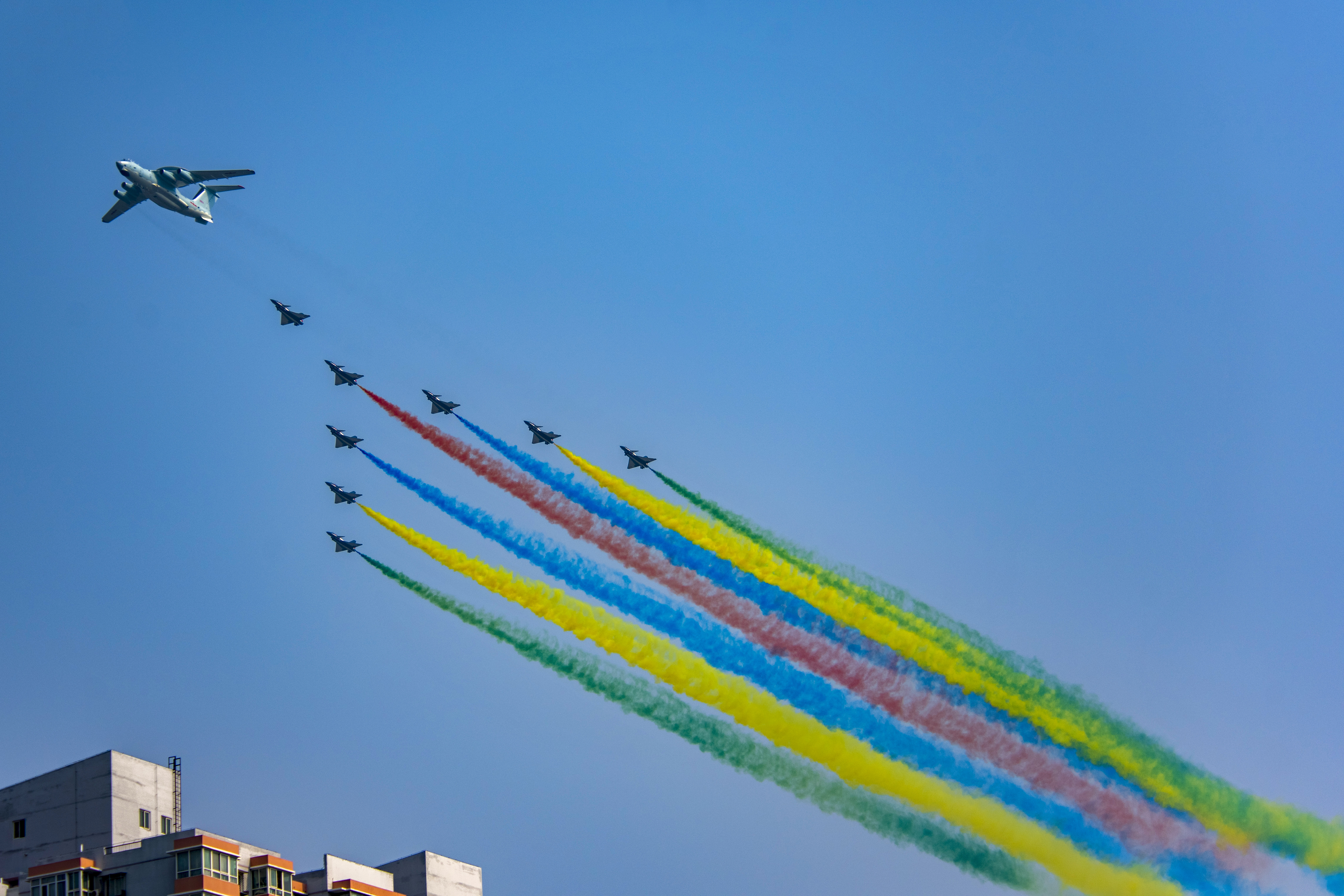
A KJ-2000 and aerobatic J-10s for celebrating the 70th National Day

== See also ==
- National Day
- History of the People's Republic of China
- 35th anniversary of the People's Republic of China
- 50th anniversary of the People's Republic of China
- 60th anniversary of the People's Republic of China
- 70th anniversary of the People's Republic of China
