= China National Radio =

National radio station of the People's Republic of China

China National Radio 中央人民广播电台

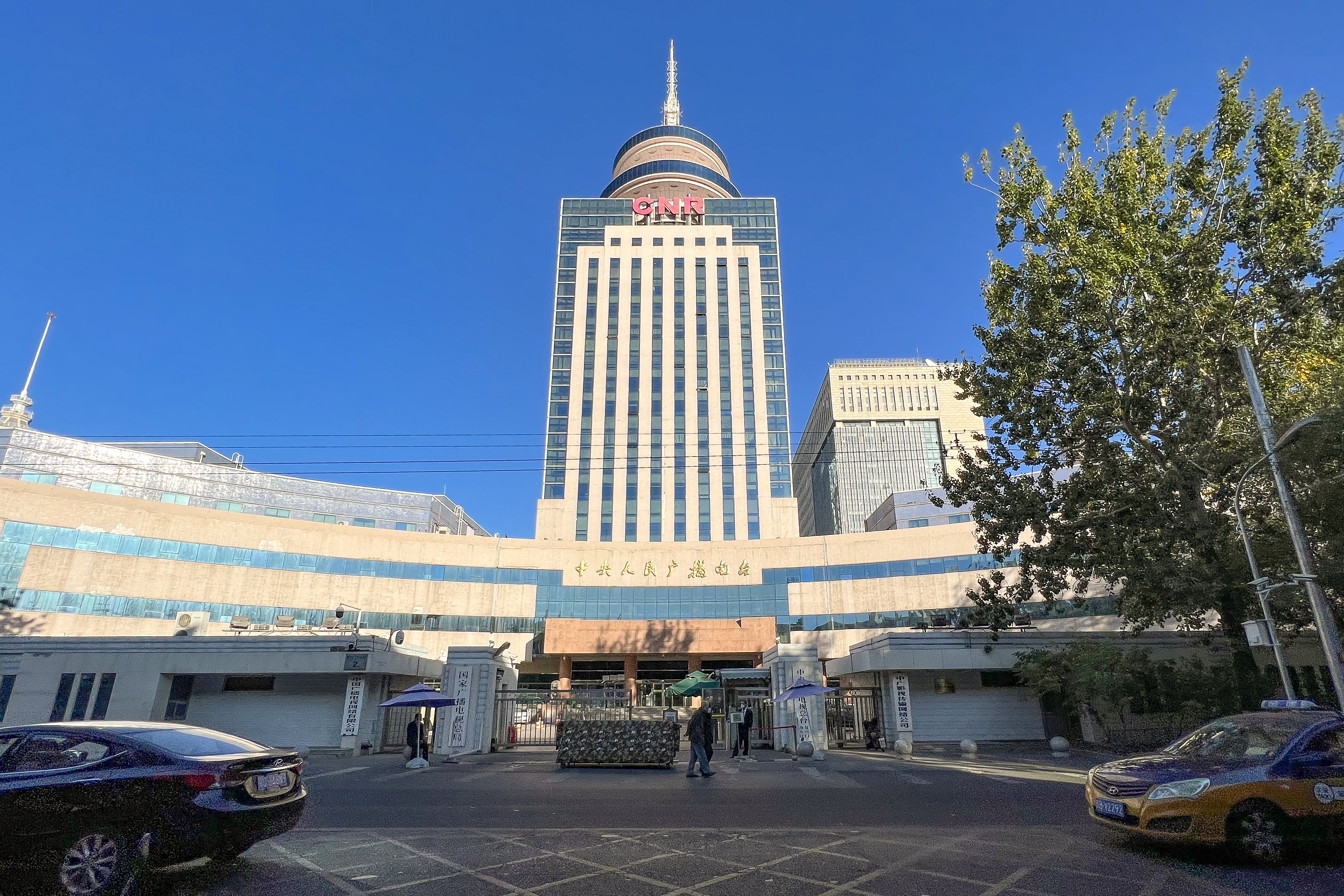
- The China National Radio Headquarters (CMG Fuxingmen Office Area)
- Country: China
- Headquarters: Beijing, China

Ownership
- Owner: China Media Group (Government of the People's Republic of China)

History
- Launch date: 5 December 1949
- Former names: Yan'an Xinhua Broadcasting Station; Shanbei Xinhua Broadcasting Station; Peiping Xinhua Broadcasting Station; Peking Xinhua Broadcasting Station; Central People's Broadcasting Station

Coverage
- Stations: 17 terrestrial stations 4 digital radio channels

Links
- Website: www.cnr.cn

China National Radio
- Simplified Chinese: 中央人民广播电台
- Traditional Chinese: 中央人民廣播電台
- Literal meaning: Central People's Broadcasting Station
Transcriptions
Standard Mandarin
- Hanyu Pinyin: Zhōngyāng Rénmín Guǎngbō Diàntái

China National Radio (CNR; Chinese: 中央人民广播电台) is the national radio network of China, headquartered in Beijing. CNR forms the national radio service of the state-owned China Media Group (also known as the "Voice of China").

== History ==
The infrastructure began with a transmitter from Moscow to set up its first station in Yan'an. It used the call sign XNCR ("New China Radio") for broadcasts, and is the first radio station set up by the Chinese Communist Party in 1940.

In the west, it was known as the Yan'an New China Radio Station (延安新华广播电台) broadcasting two hours daily. In China, it was called the Yan'an Xinhua Broadcasting Station, which was established on 30 December 1940. Mao Zedong, in a wartime address on 5 May 1941, emphasized that all of China's citizens should listen to the station.

On 25 March 1949, it was renamed Shanbei Xinhua Broadcasting Station (陕北新华广播电台) after it departed from Yan'an. It began to broadcast in Beiping under the name of Beiping Xinhua Broadcasting Station (北平新华广播电台). On December 5, 1949, it was officially named to Central People's Broadcasting Station, two months after the establishment of the People's Republic of China. The Beijing-based station offered 15.5 hours of daily programming broadcast to most parts of China, either on relay, or on simulcast to regional affilates.

The station's "Central Press and Broadcasting Bureau" was the driver in pushing all schools, the People's Liberation Army and People's Armed Police, industries and public organizations of all levels to install loud public speakers and radio relay transmitters. By the 1960s, 70 million speakers were installed reaching the rural population of 400 million.

The Central People's Broadcasting Station innovated wired transmissions, which were linked to the commonly found telephone poles hanging with loud speakers. Local stations were usually located in county seats or in individual factories or production brigades. It was part of Mao's ideology of delivering "Politics on Demand". The station served as the headquarters for propaganda during the Cultural Revolution.

During the Cultural Revolution, Central Radio offered extensive daily programming schedules, beginning with The East is Red. The majority of the daily schedule consisted of news and cultural programming, broken up with specialized programs on topics like morning calisthenics, children's shows, and broadcasts of military interest.

The station later adopted China National Radio as its English name.

== Services ==
=== Radio stations ===
| Station | Description | Frequencies |
|---|---|---|
| 中国之声; CNR-1 | Flagship radio station of CNR. Mainly news and commentaries, broadcasting 24/7 hours except during 02:05–04:25 (UTC+8) on every Tuesday. Major programmes: News and Newspapers Summary (新闻和报纸摘要), National News Simulcast (全国新闻联播), News Live (新闻进行时) | see list |
| 经济之声; CNR-2 | Mainly business news, broadcasting 24/7 hours except during 00:05–04:55 (UTC+8) on every Tuesday | MW: 630, 855, 900, and 1116; SW: 3985, 6010, 9620, 12080, 15270 etc.; FM: 96.6 in Beijing, 91.4 in Shanghai, 106.6 in Guangzhou, etc. (Frequencies on FM may vary in different cities) |
| 音乐之声; CNR-3 | Chinese and World pop music on FM in many main cities in China, broadcasting during 05:55–00:05 next day (UTC+8, except 14:05–16:55 on every Tuesday) | FM 90.0 in Beijing, FM 107.7 in Shanghai, FM 87.4 in Guangzhou, etc. (Frequencies on FM may vary in different cities) |
| 经典音乐广播; CNR-4 | Previously known as Metro Radio (都市之声). Mainly classical, ethnic and retro music, broadcasting during 04:55–01:05 next day (UTC+8, except 13:05–16:55 on every Tuesday) | FM 101.8 in Beijing |
| 台海之声; CNR-5 | The first Taiwan service, broadcasting in Mandarin. Mainly news, entertainment, talk, during 04:55–01:05 next day (UTC+8) | MW: 549, 765, 837, and 1116; SW: 5925, 7385, 9410, 9665, 9685, 11620, and 11935; FM: 102.3 in Fuzhou, Putian, eastern coastal areas of Quanzhou and Matsu; 94.9 in Xiamen, Zhangzhou, south part of Quanzhou and Kinmen |
| 神州之声; CNR-6 | The second Taiwan service, broadcasting in dialects including Hakka, Southern Min and entertainment in Mandarin, during 05:55–00:05 next day (UTC+8) | MW: 684, 909, and 1089; SW: 6165, 9420, 11905, and 15710; FM: 106.2 in Fuzhou, Putian, eastern coastal areas of Quanzhou and Matsu; 107.9 in Xiamen, Zhangzhou, south part of Quanzhou and Kinmen |
| 粤港澳大湾区之声; CNR-7 | Zhujiang delta, Hong Kong and Macao Service, broadcasting in Cantonese (some programmes may mix Mandarin), Teochew and Hakka, during 04:55–02:00 next day (UTC+8, except 14:00–17:00 on every Tuesday) | MW: 1215 in Pearl River Delta; SW: 7345, 9745, 13770, and 15550 in South China; FM: 101.2 in Zhongshan, Shenzhen, and Hong Kong; 98.0 in Guangzhou; 93.2 in Foshan and Zhaoqing; 105.4 in Zhuhai and Macau; and 102.8 via RTHK relay |
| 民族之声; CNR-8 | The Minorities Service, including Korean and Mongolian service, broadcasting during 05:00–23:05 (UTC+8) | MW: 1143 (in Mongolian, airing during 05:00–14:00), 1017 and 1143 (in Korean, airing during 14:00–19:00 for 1017, and 14:00–23:00 for 1143) (transfer CRI Korean radio during 05:00–07:00, and 19:00–23:00 for 1017); SW: 9610 and 11810 (in Mongolian, airing during 05:00–14:00), 5975 and 9785 (in Korean, airing during 14:00–23:00); FM: 104.5 (in Mongolian, airing during 05:00–14:00, transfer CNR 16 on other times); May transferred by IMRBN General News during 11:00–12:00, or by other local radio channels in Inner Mongolia. May transferred by Yanbian Korean Radio during 20:00–21:00 |
| 文艺之声; CNR-9 | Literature and entertainment programmes, broadcasting during 05:00–02:00 next day (UTC+8, except 13:05–16:55 on every Tuesday) | FM 106.6 in Beijing |
| 老年之声; CNR-10 | For the elderly, including entertainment, health programmes, etc., broadcasting during 04:25–02:05 next day (UTC+8, except 14:05–16:55 on every Tuesday) | FM 104.4 and AM 1053 in Beijing |
| 藏语广播; CNR-11 | Tibetan service, broadcasting during 05:55–00:05 next day (UTC+8) | MW: 1098; SW: 3990, 6010, 9480, 11685, 15570, etc.; FM: 105.7 in Lhasa |
| 维吾尔语广播; CNR-13 | Uyghur service, broadcasting during 07:55–02:05 next day (UTC+8) | MW: 1422 in Kashgar, 1098 in Beijing; SW: 6120, 9655, 13700, 15390, etc. |
| 香港之声; CNR-14 | Broadcasting in Hong Kong only, in Mandarin, Cantonese, Teochew and Hakka, broadcasting 24/7 hours except during 00:05–04:55 (UTC+8) on every Tuesday | on AM 675 (relayed by RTHK) and FM 87.8 in Hong Kong and Shenzhen |
| 中国交通广播; CNR-15 | Broadcasting nationwide on highways, offering highway information, broadcasting 24/7 hours except during 00:05–04:55 (UTC+8) on every Tuesday | FM 99.6 in Beijing, Tianjin, FM 101.2 in Hebei, FM 95.5 in Shanghai, FM 90.5 in Hunan, etc. (Frequencies on FM may vary in different cities) |
| 中国乡村之声; CNR-16 | Broadcasting agricultural programmes 24/7 hours except during 00:05–04:55 (UTC+8) on every Tuesday | MW: 720 in Huabei; FM: 107.9 in Donggang, 101.4 in Qingtongxia, 104.5 in Hohhot (transfer CNR 8 during 05:00–14:00); May also transferred by some local radio stations in Guizhou, Jiangsu, Inner Mongolia, Sichuan, Xinjiang, or by DTV radio functions via CDR technical |
| 哈萨克语广播; CNR-17 | Kazakh service, broadcasting during 07:55–02:05 next day (UTC+8) | MW: 1008 and 1422; SW: 4850, 6180, 9630, 12055, etc.; FM: 89.5 or 90.1 |

=== TV channels ===
- CNR Mall: TV Shopping Channel – a joint venture with QVC.

== See also ==
- Broadcasting Corporation of China (First Nationalist Party Radio)
- China Radio International
- China Central Television
