= Socialism is Good =

1958 Chinese propaganda song

"Socialism is Good" (simplified Chinese: 社会主义好; traditional Chinese: 社會主義好; pinyin: shèhuìzhǔyì hǎo) is a Chinese Communist Party propaganda song from before the Cultural Revolution, composed in 1958 by Li Huanzhi, with lyrics written by Xi Yang.

== Lyrics ==
Simplified Chinese

社会主义好，社会主义好！
社会主义国家人民地位高。
反动派被打倒，帝国主义夹着尾巴逃跑了。
全国人民大团结，掀起了社会主义建设高潮，建设高潮。

共产党好！共产党好！
共产党是人民的好领导。
说得到，作得到，全心全意为人民立功劳。
坚决跟着共产党，要把伟大祖国建设好，建设好！

社会主义好，社会主义好！
社会主义江山人民保。
人民江山坐得牢，反动分子想反也反不了。
社会主义社会一定胜利，共产主义社会一定来到，一定来到！

共产党好！共产党好！
共产党领导中国富强了。
人民江山坐得牢，反动分子想反也反 不了。
社会主义社会一定胜利，共产主义社会一定来到，一定来到！

Traditional Chinese

社會主義好，社會主義好！
社會主義國家人民地位高。
反動派被打倒，帝國主義夾着尾巴逃跑了。 (Note: 着 is the form used in Simplified Chinese and the Hong Kong / Macau variant of Traditional Chinese.)
全國人民大團結，掀起了社會主義建設高潮，建設高潮。

共產黨好！共產黨好！
共產黨是人民的好領導。
說得到，作得到，全心全意為人民立功勞。
堅決跟着共產黨，要把偉大祖國建設好，建設好！

社會主義好，社會主義好！
社會主義江山人民保。
人民江山坐得牢，反動分子想反也反不了。
社會主義社會一定勝利，共產主義社會一定來到，一定來到！

共產黨好！共產黨好！
共產黨領導中國富強了。
人民江山坐得牢，反動分子想反也反 不了。
社會主義社會一定勝利，共產主義社會一定來到，一定來到！

Pinyin

Shèhuì zhǔyì hǎo, shèhuì zhǔyì hǎo!
Shèhuì zhǔyì guójiā rénmín dìwèi gāo;
Fǎndòngpài bèi dǎdǎo, dìguó zhǔyì jiā zhe wěiba táopǎo liǎo.
Quánguó rénmín dà tuánjié, xiānqǐ le shèhuì zhǔyì jiànshè gāocháo, jiànshè gāocháo.

Gòngchǎndǎng hǎo! Gòngchǎndǎng hǎo!
Gòngchǎndǎng shì rénmín de hǎo lǐngdǎo.
Shuō dédào, zuò dédào, quánxīnquányì wéi rénmín lì gōngláo.
Jiānjué gēnzhe gòngchǎndǎng, yào bǎ wěidà zǔguó jiànshè hǎo, jiànshè hǎo!

Shèhuì zhǔyì hǎo, shèhuì zhǔyì hǎo!
Shèhuì zhǔyì jiāngshān rénmín bǎo.
Rénmín jiāngshān zuò de láo, fǎndòng fēnzǐ xiǎng fǎn yě fǎn bú liǎo.
Shèhuì zhǔyì shèhuì yīdìng shènglì, gòngchǎn zhǔyì shèhuì yīdìng lái dào, yīdìng lái dào!

Gòngchǎndǎng hǎo! Gòngchǎndǎng hǎo!
Gòngchǎndǎng lǐngdǎo zhōngguó fùqiáng liǎo.
Rénmín jiāngshān zuò de láo, fǎndòng fēnzǐ xiǎng fǎn yě fǎn bú liao.
Shèhuì zhǔyì shèhuì yīdìng shènglì, gòngchǎn zhǔyì shèhuì yīdìng lái dào, yīdìng lái dào!

English translation

Socialism is good, socialism is good!
People of socialist countries have high social status.
Reactionaries are overthrown, Imperialism tucks its tail and flees.
The entire country is united setting of a tide in socialist construction.

The Communist Party is good! The Communist Party is good!
The Communist Party is a good leader for the people.
It keeps its promises and works wholeheartedly for the people.
Firmly adhere to the Communist Party in the assured construction, the assured construction, of our great motherland!

Socialism is good, socialism is good!
The people protect the socialist system.
The power of people is invincible, the resistance of reactionary cliques is destined to fail.
The cause of socialism will definitely be victorious, a communist society will definitely come true, will definitely come true!

The Communist Party is good! The Communist Party is good!
The Communist Party guides China on the way to power and wealth.
The power of people is invincible, the resistance of reactionary cliques is destined to fail.
The cause of socialism will definitely be victorious, a communist society will definitely come true, will definitely come true!

== Cover versions ==
Chinese rock musician Zhang Chu covered the song for his 1992 album Red Rock.
