= Without the Communist Party, There Would Be No New China =

Chinese Communist Party song

- A graffiti mural in Beijing with the name of the song in simplified Chinese characters during the 90-year anniversary of the founding of the Communist Party
- Simplified Chinese: 没有共产党就没有新中国
- Traditional Chinese: 沒有共產黨就沒有新中國
- Hanyu Pinyin: Méiyǒu Gòngchǎndǎng Jiù Méiyǒu Xīn Zhōngguó
Transcriptions
Standard Mandarin
- Hanyu Pinyin: Méiyǒu Gòngchǎndǎng Jiù Méiyǒu Xīn Zhōngguó
- Bopomofo: ㄇㄟˊ ㄧㄡˇ ㄍㄨㄥˋ ㄔㄢˇ ㄉㄤˇ ㄐㄧㄡˋ ㄇㄟˊ ㄧㄡˇ ㄒㄧㄣ ㄓㄨㄥ ㄍㄨㄛˊ
- Wade–Giles: Mei^{2}-yu^{3} Kung^{4}-ch'an^{3}-tang^{3} Chiu^{4} Mei^{2}-yu^{3} Hsin^{1} Chung^{1}-kuo^{2}
- IPA: [měɪ.jòʊ kʊ̂ŋ.ʈʂʰàn.tàŋ tɕjôʊ měɪ.jòʊ ɕín ʈʂʊ́ŋ.kwǒ]
Yue: Cantonese
- Jyutping: Mut6 jau5 Gung6 caan2 dong2 Zau6 Mut6 jau5 San1 Zung1 gwok3

An excerpt from the song

"Without the Communist Party, There Would Be No New China" or "No Communist Party, No New China" is a Chinese Communist Party (CCP) song written in 1943. The author, Cao Huoxing, was inspired by a Liberation Daily editorial of the same name, which was published in response to the phrase, "Without the Kuomintang there would be no China".

== History ==
=== Background ===
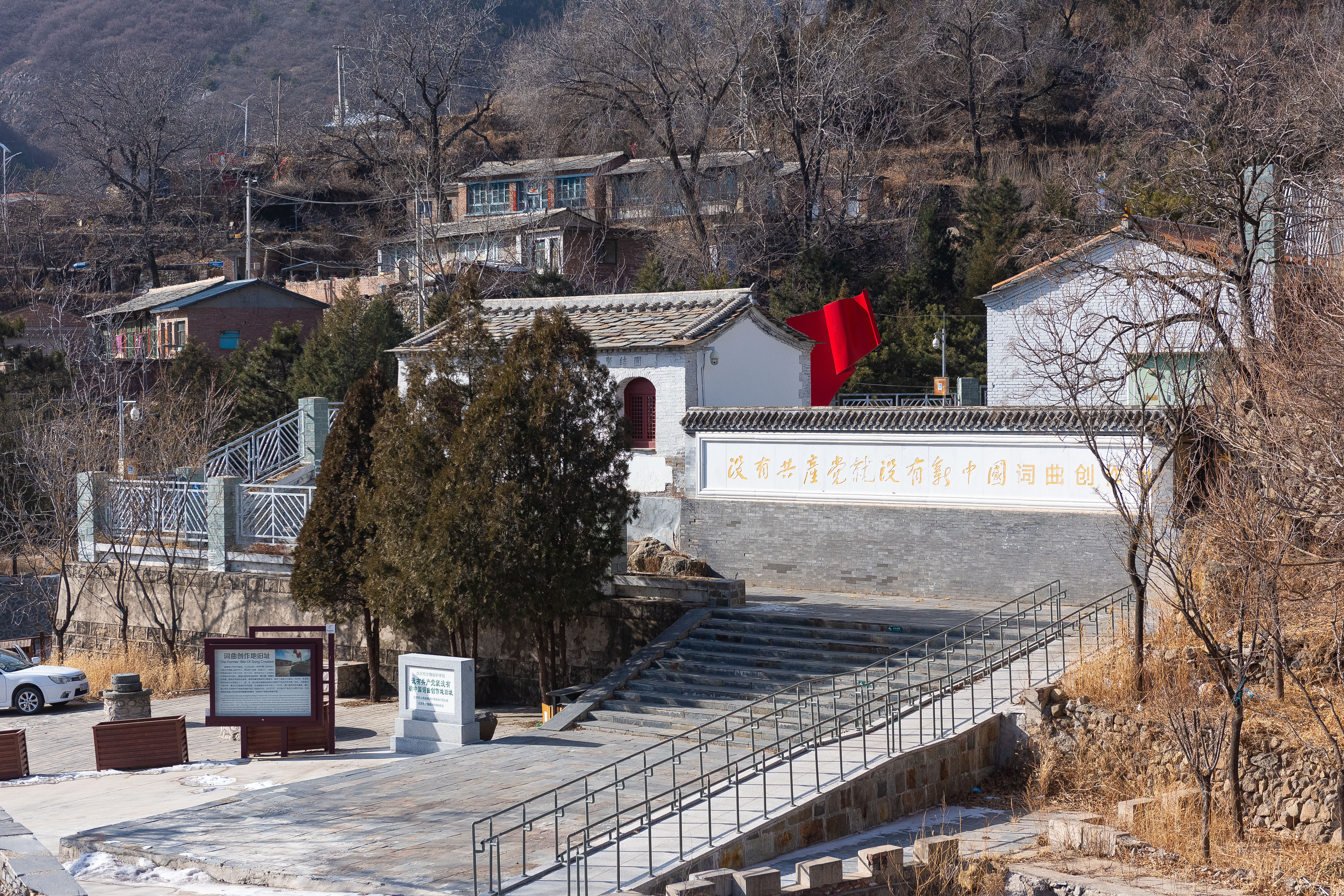
Zhongtang Temple in Tangshang Village, where Cao Huoxing wrote the song in 1943

During World War II when China was fighting the Japanese invasion, Chiang Kai-shek published a book titled China's Destiny in 1943 containing the statement, "Without the Kuomintang there would be no China." The Chinese Communist Party published an editorial entitled "Without the Communist Party there would be no China" in the Jiefang Daily on 25 August 1943 to criticize the book, concluding that "If today's China had no Communist Party of China, there would be no new China." Poet Cao Huoxing wrote a song on this theme titled "Without the Communist Party, There Would be No China."

In 1950, shortly after the foundation of the People's Republic of China, Mao Zedong changed the title to "Without the Communist Party, There Would Be No New China," by adding the word "new."

The song is included in the 1965 film The East is Red.

=== Memorials ===
A memorial dedicated to the song in Fangshan District, Beijing, which covers an area of 6,000 square metres (65,000 sq ft), was opened to the public on 26 June 2006. The site, No Communist Party, No New China Memorial Hall, was designated in 2019 as a national patriotic education demonstration site.

In June 2021, a 587-meter-long musical road playing the song was built on China National Highway 108 near Xiayunling, where the song was written.

== Lyrics ==
=== Simplified Chinese Lyrics ===
没有共产党就没有新中国
没有共产党就没有新中国
共产党辛劳为民族
共产党他一心救中国
他指给了人民解放的道路
他领导中国走向光明
他坚持了抗战八年多
他改善了人民生活
他建设了敌后根据地
他实行了民主好处多
没有共产党就没有新中国
没有共产党就没有新中国

=== Traditional Chinese Lyrics ===
沒有共產黨就沒有新中國
沒有共產黨就沒有新中國
共產黨辛勞為民族
共產黨他一心救中國
他指給了人民解放的道路
他領導中國走向光明
他堅持了抗戰八年多
他改善了人民生活
他建設了敵後根據地
他實行了民主好處多
沒有共產黨就沒有新中國
沒有共產黨就沒有新中國

=== Transliteration ===
Méiyǒu Gòngchǎndǎng jiù méiyǒu xīn Zhōngguó.
Méiyǒu Gòngchǎndǎng jiù méiyǒu xīn Zhōngguó.
Gòngchǎndǎng xīnláo wèi mínzú.
Gòngchǎndǎng tā yīxīn jiù Zhōngguó.
Tā zhǐgěi le rénmín jiěfàng de dàolù.
Tā lǐngdǎo Zhōngguó zǒuxiàng guāngmíng.
Tā jiānchí le kàngzhàn bā nián duō.
Tā gǎishàn le rénmín shēnghuó.
Tā jiànshè le díhòu gēnjùdì.
Tā shíxíng le mínzhǔ hǎochù duō.
Méiyǒu Gòngchǎndǎng jiù méiyǒu xīn Zhōngguó.
Méiyǒu Gòngchǎndǎng jiù méiyǒu xīn Zhōngguó.

=== English Translation ===
Without the Communist Party, there would be no New China.
Without the Communist Party, there would be no New China.
The Communist Party toiled for the nation.
The Communist Party of one-mind saved China.
It pointed to the road of liberation for the people.
It led China towards the light.
It supported the War of Resistance for more than eight years.
It has improved people’s lives.
It built a base behind enemy lines.
It practiced democracy, bringing many advantages.
Without the Communist Party, there would be no New China.
Without the Communist Party, there would be no New China!

== See also ==
- List of socialist songs
- Honglaowai
- Hao Ge
