= National anthem law =

National anthem law could be laws regulating national anthems in various countries, including:

- National Anthem Ordinance, in Hong Kong
- Act on National Flag and Anthem, in Japan
