= Hiromori =

- Gender: Male

Origin
- Origin: Japanese
- Meaning: Different meanings depending on the kanji used

Hiromori (written: 廣守) is a masculine Japanese given name. Notable people with the name include:

- Hiromori Hayashi (林 廣守; 1831–1896), Japanese composer
- Hiromori Kawashima (川島 廣守; 1922-2012), Japanese baseball commissioner
