= National Anthem Ordinance =

Legislation of Hong Kong

Legislative Council of Hong Kong
- Long title: An Ordinance to provide for the playing and singing of the Chinese national anthem, for the protection of the national anthem, and for the promotion of the national anthem, in Hong Kong; and for incidental matters.
- Citation: Ordinance No. 2 of 2020
- Territorial extent: Hong Kong
- Enacted by: Legislative Council of Hong Kong
- Signed: 11 June 2020
- Commenced: 12 June 2020

Legislative history
- Bill title: National Anthem Bill
- Introduced by: Secretary for Constitutional and Mainland Affairs Patrick Nip
- Introduced: 11 January 2019
- First reading: 23 January 2019
- Second reading: 28 May 2020
- Third reading: 4 June 2020

Amended by
- 13 of 2021
- Status: In force

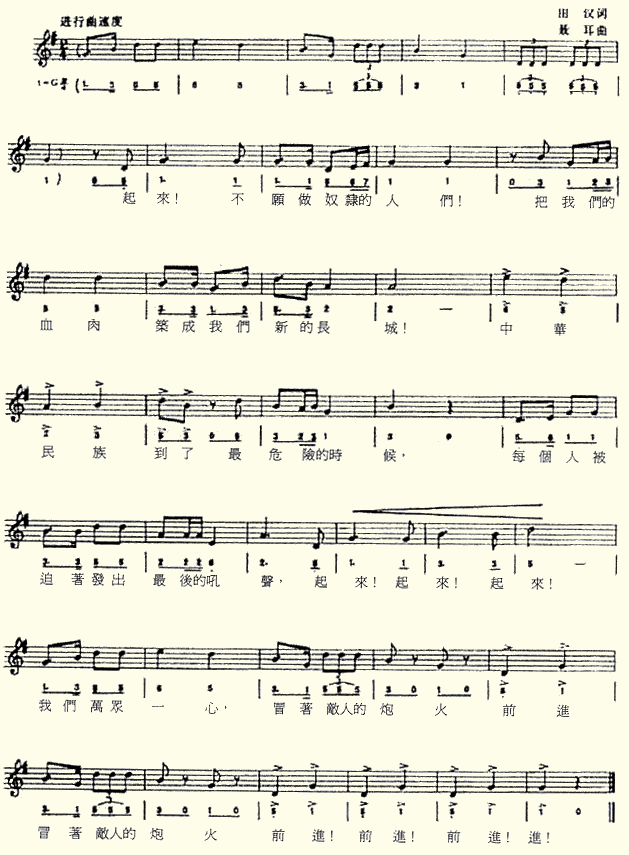
The "March of the Volunteers", national anthem of the People's Republic of China.

National Anthem Ordinance
- Traditional Chinese: 國歌條例
Transcriptions
Yue: Cantonese
- Yale Romanization: Gwokgō tìuhlaih
- Jyutping: Gwok3go1 tiu4lai6

The National Anthem Ordinance is an ordinance of Hong Kong intended to criminalise "insults to the national anthem of China" ("March of the Volunteers"). It is a local law in response to the National Anthem Law of the People's Republic of China.

Chinese Communist Party General Secretary Xi Jinping made a speech regarding the national anthem legislation in early 2017. The ordinance commenced on 12 June 2020.

== Content ==
The ordinance consists of 6 parts.

Part 1 serves as the preliminary, explicitly defining concepts such as “national anthem” and “national flag”.

Part 2 dictates regulations regarding the playing and singing of the national anthem, for example compelling citizens to “stand solemnly and deport themselves with dignity” during the playing of the national anthem.

Part 3 depicts the protection of the national anthem. It prohibits citizens from using the national anthem in certain settings, such as for commercial purposes or as background music. It also bans citizens from insulting the national anthem in any way, such as altering its lyrics or singing it in a distorted way.

Part 4 concerns the promotion of the national anthem. It dictates that primary and secondary educations must incorporate the national anthem in their curriculum, including its singing, history and the etiquette regarding it. It also requires all sound and television broadcasters to play the national anthem when requested by the Communication Authority.

Part 5 contains supplementary provisions. It states that in case of inconsistencies between this ordinance and the Law of the People's Republic of China on National Anthem adopted by the NPC, this ordinance should be applied.

Part 6 contains consequential amendments to other ordinances, for example adding passages regarding the use of national anthem to the Trade Marks Ordinance.

== Developments ==
On 8 January 2019, the Executive Council drafted the national anthem bill and submitted it to the Legislative Council (LegCo) two weeks later. After its first reading, the legislation process was successfully blocked by pro-democracy councillors, and later by months of social unrest caused by 2019–20 Hong Kong protests until its summer recess in July.

After the start of the new session in October 2019, Starry Lee, a pro-establishment councillor, stepped down from her position of the chairperson of the House Committee in order to participate in re-election. Dennis Kwok, a legislator belonging to the Civic Party, thus presided over the committee as Deputy Chair. Pan-democratic legislators have since then employed a tactic some referred to as “filibustering”, holding lengthy discussions on issues such as the extent of authority the police force has within the LegCo building or the operation of LegCo under COVID-19, successfully delaying the re-election of chairperson. Since a chair must be elected in the House Committee before any bills can be discussed, the national anthem bill was effectively blocked.

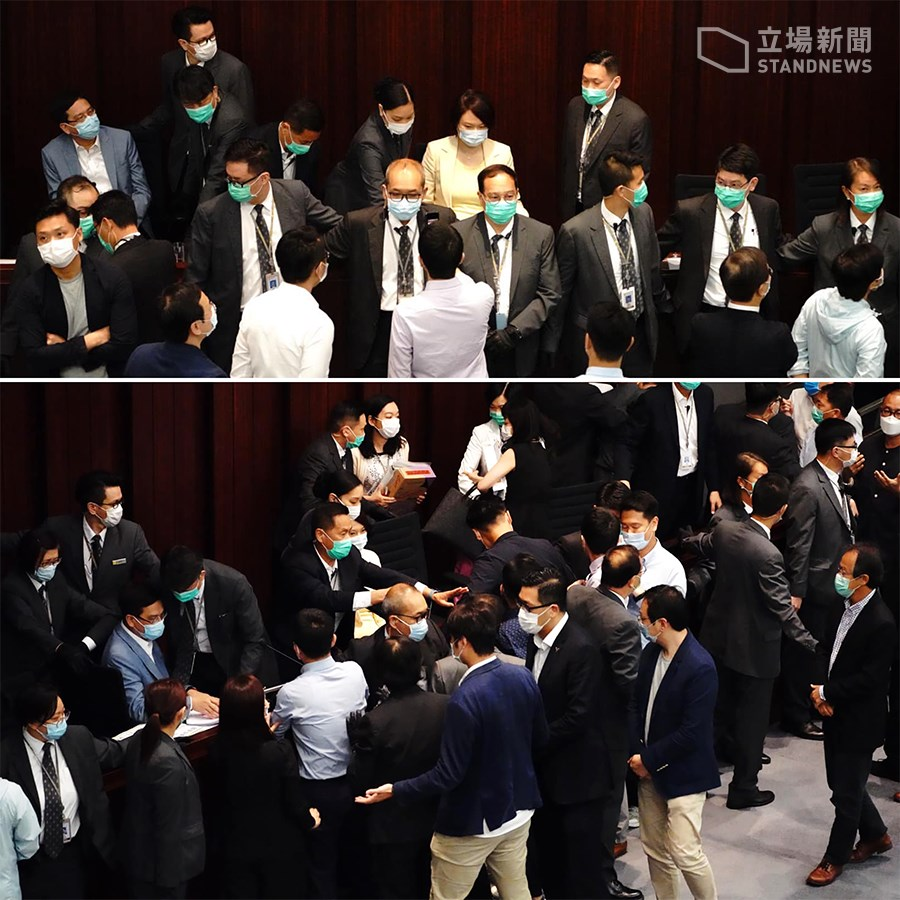
Starry Lee physically occupying the committee chair in LegCo while being protected by security guards and other pro-establishment legislators, on 8 May 2020.

On 8 May 2020, Lee, after declaring the authority to preside over a committee meeting to end the months-long legislation deadlock, physically occupied the vacant committee chair, citing her previous occupancy of the chair in 2019. Pro-Beijing lawmakers and security staff kept pro-democracy lawmakers at bay for the committee meeting, with Lee urging lawmakers to take their seats, stating "I have not seized power, I am the incumbent chairperson of the house committee". Scuffles broke out, with at least one pro-democracy lawmaker reportedly injured. Most of the pro-democracy lawmakers eventually walked out. Lee and LegCo legal adviser Connie Fung stated Lee could preside due to the abnormal situation where a chair had not been elected for six months due to filibustering by pro-democracy lawmakers. The director of Hong Kong Watch stated "The current logjam in LegCo is a direct result of a broken system where the only strategy that the democrats have, despite representing the majority, is filibustering." Reports stated that Lee intends to criminalise disrespect of the Chinese national anthem, and also intends to re-attempt to introduce article 23 national security laws.

On 28 May 2020, the bill passed its second reading. Pan-democracy legislator Ted Hui dropped a rotten plant in front of LegCo president Andrew Leung in protest, for which he was later fined.

On 4 June 2020, the bill passed its third reading, with 41 legislators in favour of it and 1 against. 41 out of 42 pro-establishment legislators voted in favour of it, except the chairperson Leung who abstained. 1 out of 23 pan-democracy legislators voted against it, with the others abstaining, in protest. Before the voting, pan-democracy legislators Raymond Chan and Eddie Chu splashed a jar of reeking liquid in front of the rostrum in protest, accusing Andrew Leung of being a “rubber stamp” and that what he did will “reek for ten thousand years”. They were later fined for their action.

On 11 June 2020, the National Anthem Ordinance was signed by the Chief Executive Carrie Lam. It came into force on the next day after it was published in the Hong Kong Government Gazette.

On 30 July 2021, police made its first arrest under the law. The detainee was a 40-year-old man who had allegedly urged people to boo the Chinese national anthem as it was played at a live screening of an Olympics award ceremony in a shopping mall in Kwun Tong.

== See also ==
- Act on National Flag and Anthem (in Japan)
- China–Hong Kong football rivalry
- Glory to Hong Kong
