= The Patriotic Song =

The Patriotic Song may refer to:

- "Aegukga", the national anthem of South Korea
- "Aegukka", the national anthem of North Korea
- National anthem of the Korean Empire, the former national anthem of Korea
- "The Patriotic Song" (anthem), a former national anthem of Russia

== See also ==
- Category:Lists of patriotic songs
- Category:American patriotic songs
