= Korean national anthem =

Korean national anthem may refer to:

- "Aegukka", the national anthem of North Korea
- "Aegukga", the national anthem of South Korea
- National anthem of the Korean Empire
- "Arirang", a Korean folk song that is often considered to be the anthem of Korea
