= Act on National Flag and Anthem =

Japanese law ratified in 1999

Act on National Flag and Anthem 国旗及び国歌に関する法律
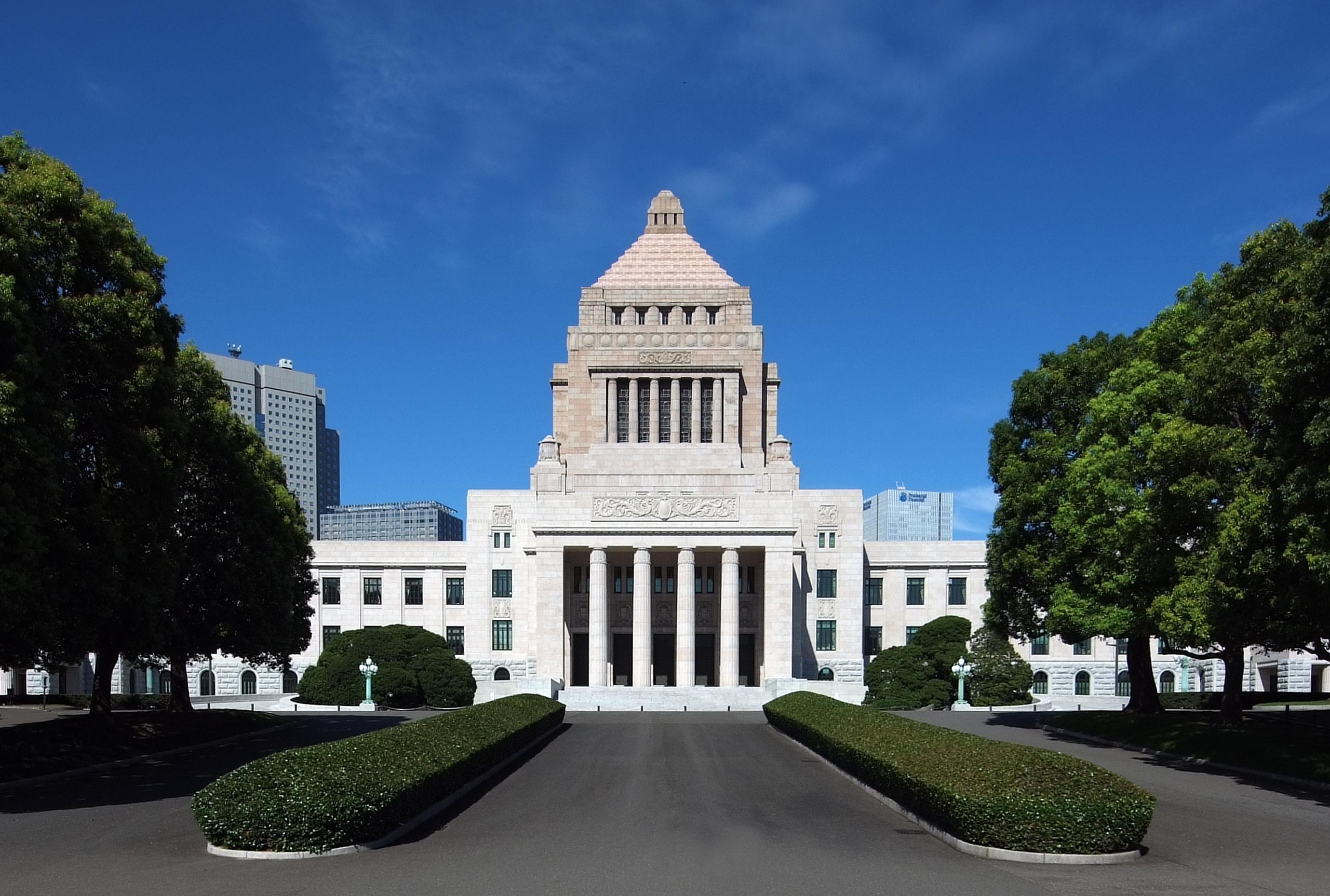

National Diet
- Citation: Law No. 127 of Heisei 11
- Enacted by: House of Representatives
- Enacted: 22 July 1999
- Enacted by: House of Councillors
- Enacted: 9 August 1999
- Royal assent: 13 August 1999
- Effective: 13 August 1999
- Administered by: Cabinet Office; Ministry of Land, Infrastructure, Transport and Tourism

Legislative history

Initiating chamber: House of Representatives
- Bill title: Bill on National Flag and Anthem
- Introduced: 11 June 1999

Summary
- To ratify the national flag and anthem of Japan
- Status: Current legislation

The Act on National Flag and Anthem (国旗及び国歌に関する法律, Kokki Oyobi Kokka ni Kansuru Hōritsu), abbreviated as 国旗国歌法, is a law that formally established Japan's national flag and anthem. Before its ratification on August 13, 1999, there was no official flag or anthem for Japan. The nisshōki (日章旗) flag, commonly referred to as the hinomaru (日の丸), had represented Japan unofficially since 1870; "Kimigayo" (君が代) had been used as Japan's de facto anthem since 1880.

After Japan's defeat in World War II, there were suggestions to legislate the hinomaru and Kimigayo as the official symbols of Japan. However, a law to establish the hinomaru and Kimigayo as official in 1974 failed in the National Diet, due to the opposition of the Japan Teachers' Union that insists they have a connection with Japanese militarism. It was suggested that both the hinomaru and Kimigayo should be made official after a school principal in Hiroshima committed suicide over a dispute regarding the use of the flag and anthem in a school ceremony.

After a vote in both houses of the National Diet, the law was passed on August 9, 1999. Promulgated and enforced on August 13, 1999, it was considered one of the most controversial laws passed by the National Diet in the 1990s. The debate surrounding the law also revealed a split in the leadership of the opposition Democratic Party of Japan (DPJ) and the unity of the ruling Liberal Democratic Party (LDP) and coalition partners.

The passage of the law was met with mixed reactions. Although some Japanese hailed the passage, others felt that it was a shift toward restoring nationalistic feelings and culture: it was passed in time for the tenth anniversary of the Emperor Akihito's reign. In the countries that Japan had occupied during World War II, some felt that the law's passage, along with debates on laws related to military affairs and Yasukuni Shrine, marked a shift in Japan toward the political right. Regulations and government orders issued in the wake of this law, especially those issued by the Tokyo Board of Education, were also challenged in court by some Japanese due to conflicts with the Japanese constitution.

== Text of the act ==
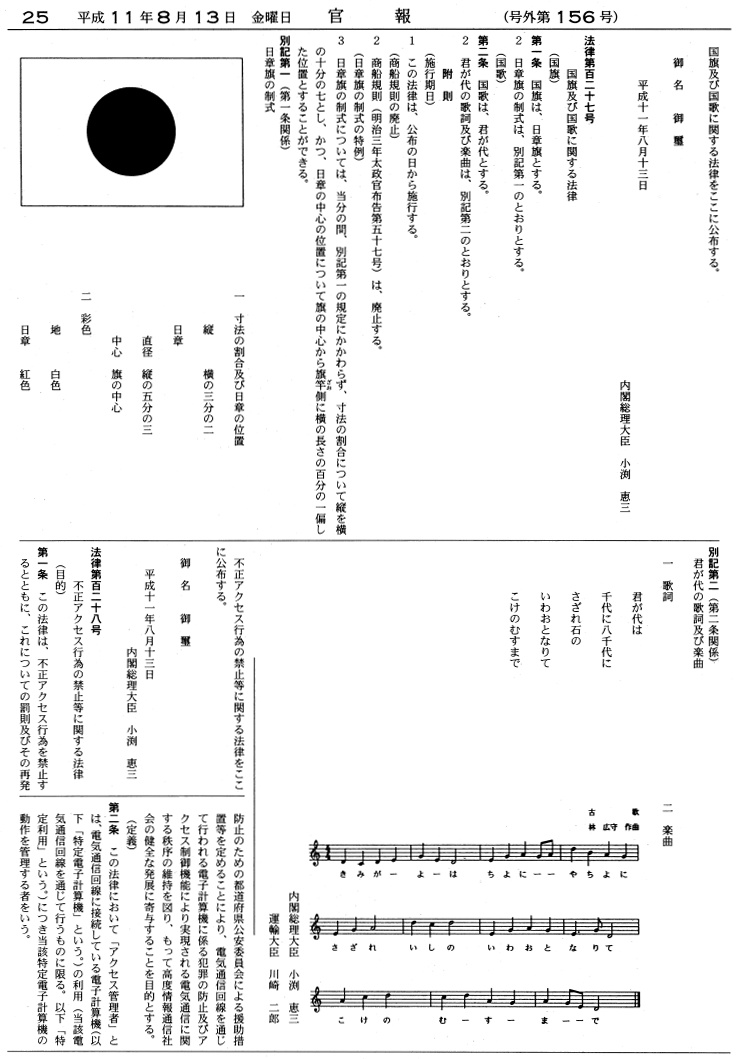
Official gazette published on 13 August 1999

The Act on National Flag and Anthem established the Nisshōki as the national flag and Kimigayo as the national anthem. Details about each symbol were provided in appendices, including specifications for the construction of the flag and sheet music for Kimigayo. The law made no provisions for the use or treatment of either symbol, leading to different national and prefectural agencies and ministries creating their own regulations. If rules about the use of the flag and anthem had been included in the act, it would not have gained enough support in the Diet to pass.

=== Provisions for the flag ===
A diagram illustrating the placement and size ratio of the elements of the flag

The drawing and construction details of the flag are given in the first appendix. The overall ratio of the flag is two-units length to three-units width (2:3). The red disc is at the exact center of the flag and its diameter is three-fifths of the flag's height. However, the 1999 law allowed the continued use and manufacture of flags with the proportions set down in the Prime Minister's Proclamation No. 57 of 1870, which stipulated that the flag have a seven-to-ten (7:10) ratio, with the red disc off-center by one-hundredth of the flag's length toward the side of the hoist. The background of the flag is white, and the disc red, but the exact color shades were not defined in the 1999 law. Further explanations from the government merely stated that the red color is a deep shade. Specifications published by the Ministry of Defense in 2008 defined the shades of red for the flag. During deliberations in the Diet about this bill, there was a suggestion to either use a bright red (赤色 (aka iro)) shade or choose from the color pool of the Japanese Industrial Standards.

=== Provisions for the anthem ===
Kimigayo
A recording of the anthem from 1930

The lyrics and musical notation of the anthem are given in the second appendix. The text of the law does not credit a single person for the lyrics or music, but the notation credits Hiromori Hayashi for the musical arrangement. However, evidence suggests that Yoshiisa Oku and Akimori Hayashi (son of Hiromori) authored the music; the elder Hayashi had put his name on it for serving as their supervisor and Chief Court Musician of the Imperial Court. The melody was eventually put to a Western-style harmony by Franz Eckert and has been in use since 1880. The lyrics on the sheet music are in hiragana, and there is no mention for a tempo for the vocal arrangement. The anthem is played in the Dorian mode in common (4/4) time.

== Hinomaru and Kimigayo before 1999 ==
The hinomaru was widely used on military banners in the Sengoku period of the 15th and 16th centuries. During the Meiji Restoration, on February 27, 1870 (January 27, 3rd year of Meiji in the Japanese calendar), the flag was officially adopted as the civil ensign by Proclamation No. 57. The hinomaru was legally the national flag from 1870 to 1885, but Japanese law did not designate a national flag from 1885 to 1999 because with the modernization of the cabinet, all of the prior Council of States' declarations were abolished. Despite this, several military banners of Japan are based on the design of the hinomaru, including the sun-rayed Naval Ensign. The hinomaru was used as a template to design other Japanese flags, and its use was severely restricted during the early years of the Allied-occupation after World War II, although these restrictions were later relaxed.

Kimigayo is one of the world's shortest national anthems, with a length of 11 measures and 32 characters. Its lyrics are based on a Waka poem written in the Heian period (794–1185) and sung to a melody composed in the Meiji era (1868–1912). In 1869, John William Fenton, a visiting Irish military band leader, realized there was no national anthem in Japan, and suggested to Iwao Ōyama, an officer of the Satsuma Clan, that one be created. Ōyama agreed, and selected the lyrics.

The lyrics may have been chosen for their similarity to the British national anthem because of Fenton's influence. After selecting the anthem's lyrics, Ōyama then asked Fenton to create the melody. This was the first version of Kimigayo, which was discarded because the melody "lacked solemnity." In 1880, the Imperial Household Agency adopted the current melody of Kimigayo, and the government formally adopted Kimigayo as the national anthem in 1888. By 1893, Kimigayo was included in public school ceremonies due to the efforts of the then Ministry of Education. During the Allied-occupation of Japan, there were no directives by the Supreme Commander for the Allied Powers to restrict use of Kimigayo by the Japanese government. However, only the score of Kimigayo was played during official ceremonies following the war; the lyrics were not sung.

== Background of the legislation ==
The proposal for the law was motivated by the suicide of a school principal in Hiroshima, who could not resolve a dispute between his school board and his teachers over use of the Hinomaru and Kimigayo. The principal of Sera High School in Sera, Ishikawa Toshihiro, killed himself the evening before his school's graduation ceremony. The Hiroshima Prefecture School Board had demanded that all principals ensure use of both symbols at every school ceremony, but the teachers at Sera High School vehemently opposed the practice. Ishikawa took his own life after failing to win support of his teachers on this issue.

Ishikawa's suicide, along with the protests by teachers at the graduation ceremony at Sera High School, prompted Prime Minister Keizō Obuchi of the Liberal Democratic Party (LDP) to draft legislation to make the Hinomaru and Kimigayo the official symbols of Japan. He intended for the legislation to be introduced in 2000, but his Chief Cabinet Secretary, Hiromu Nonaka, wanted it in effect by November 1999, the tenth anniversary of the enthronement of Emperor Akihito and start of Heisei era).

This is not the first time legislation was proposed to make the Hinomaru and Kimigayo official symbols. After the return of Okinawa Prefecture to Japan from American rule in 1972 and the global oil crisis of 1973, then-Prime Minister Tanaka Kakuei hinted in 1974 at the passage of a law that would legalize use of both symbols, a move done partially to increase his popularity with conservative voters. At the time of his suggestion, the Japan Teachers' Union was opposed to using the anthem because it "smacked of emperor worship" and was seen as a connection to pre-war militarism. Although the literacy rate in Japan was 99 percent at the time, many students did not know what Kimigayo even was or how to sing it. In addition to instructing the schools to teach and play Kimigayo, Kakuei wanted students to raise the flag and read the Imperial Rescript on Education, pronounced by the Emperor Meiji in 1890, every morning. Kakuei was unsuccessful in passing the legislation through the Diet.

== Party positions ==
=== In support ===
The main conservative parties of Japan, the LDP and the Liberal Party, were the chief supporters of the 1999 bill. LDP General Secretary Yoshirō Mori stated in June of that year that the Japanese people had accepted both the Hinomaru and Kimigayo as national symbols. The President of the Liberal Party, Ichirō Ozawa, echoed the same sentiment and believed that the Diet could not conclude otherwise. The New Komeito (also known as the Clean Government Party, or CGP) was initially cautious about the bill. Although some of its leadership conceded that both symbols were accepted by the people, they believed that establishing the idea as a law could be a violation of the Japanese Constitution. The CGP eventually supported the bill in exchange for being allowed into the LDP coalition.

=== In opposition ===
The Social Democratic Party (SDPJ) and Communist Party (JCP) opposed the bill because of the connotations both symbols have with the war era, and because the public was not given the option to settle the issue by a referendum. The chairman of the CPJ said that the party would prefer new symbols that represent a democratic and peaceful Japan. The SDPJ's opposition was a change from its previous stance toward the symbols; Prime Minister Tomiichi Murayama of the Japan Socialist Party (the SDPJ's former name) accepted both the Hinomaru and Kimigayo as the symbols of Japan in exchange for support from the LDP in the National Diet in 1994.

=== The Democratic Party of Japan ===
The then-president of the Democratic Party of Japan (DPJ), Naoto Kan, stated that his party must support the bill because it had already recognized both as symbols of Japan. Then-Deputy Secretary General Yukio Hatoyama believed that the bill would cause further problems for school officials and unrest among leftist groups that oppose the flag and anthem. The DPJ offered an amendment to the bill that designated the Hinomaru as the national flag but gave Kimigayo no special status; an alternative anthem was to be found. On July 16, the DPJ decided to issue its amendment; if it was rejected, the party members would be allowed to vote freely. Other groups issued their own bills against the government's legislation; they were all rejected before the main vote on the bill.

== Public opinion ==
In the week before the vote in the House of Councillors, The Japan Times conducted a poll in Tokyo, Osaka and Hiroshima. Approximately nine out of ten respondents favored having the Hinomaru as the national flag, and six out of ten supported Kimigayo as the national anthem. Overall, about 46 percent were in favor of the bill. Respondents thought of the Hinomaru as the flag of Japan and that its history should be taught. Some felt that Kimigayo was an inappropriate anthem for modern Japan; one respondent suggested using the song "Sakura Sakura" instead. Another suggestion was to keep the melody of Kimigayo but replace the lyrics.

A March 1999 poll conducted by the Yomiuri Shimbun and one by the Japan Research Council on Public Opinion Polls in July 1999 yielded different results from the poll by The Japan Times. In the former, taken after the suicide of Toshihiro, 61 percent felt that the symbols of Japan should be the Hinomaru as the flag and Kimigayo as the anthem; 64 percent felt it desirable to have both symbols used at school ceremonies, and 68 percent felt both symbols should be enshrined in law. The poll by the Japan Research Council on Public Opinion Polls showed similar results; 68 percent felt that both the Hinomaru and Kimigayo were the symbols of Japan; 71 percent supported the bill in the Diet. Both polls had slightly less than 2,000 respondents. There was 15 percent more support for the Hinomaru than for Kimigayo; the lyrics of Kimigayo were directly associated with the emperor. Both polls also showed that older generations had a greater attachment to the symbols, while younger generations exhibited more negative feelings.

== Vote ==
The House of Representatives passed the bill on 22 July 1999 by a 403-to-86 vote during the 145th National Diet.

The legislation was then sent to the House of Councillors on 28 July and passed on 9 August 1999 by a 166-to-71 vote. It was enacted as law on August 13.

Bill on National Flag and Anthem House of Representatives vote
| Party | Votes for | Votes against | Abstained | Absent |
|---|---|---|---|---|
| LDP (260) | 260 | – | – | – |
| Democratic (92) | 45 | 46 | – | 1 |
| Komeito (52) | 52 | – | – | – |
| Liberal (39) | 38 | – | – | 1 |
| JCP (26) | – | 26 | – | – |
| Social Democratic (14) | – | 14 | – | – |
| Independents (16) | 8 | – | – | 8 |
| Total (499) | 403 | 86 | 0 | 10 |

Bill on National Flag and Anthem House of Councillors vote
| Party | Votes for | Votes against | Abstained | Absent |
|---|---|---|---|---|
| LDP (101) | 101 | – | – | – |
| Democratic (56) | 20 | 31 | 5 | – |
| Komeito (24) | 24 | – | – | – |
| JCP (23) | – | 23 | – | – |
| Social Democratic (13) | – | 13 | – | – |
| Liberal (12) | 12 | – | – | – |
| Independents (22) | 9 | 4 | – | 9 |
| Total (251) | 166 | 71 | 5 | 9 |

== Reactions ==
=== Domestic ===
Prime Minister Keizō Obuchi was enthusiastic over the passage of the law because it established a "clear basis by written law" for use of the symbols. He felt this was a major step for Japan to "move into the 21st century". Emperor Akihito declined to comment on the law when asked at a press conference on his birthday (December 23), mostly due to the constitutional prohibition for the Emperor to speak on political matters. However, Emperor Akihito expressed displeasure to Tokyo Education Board member Kunio Yonenaga in 2004 that forcing teachers and students to honor the flag and anthem was not "desirable." The head of a teachers' federation praised the legislation, believing it would help them inculcate people with a proper sense of respect for a country's symbols, thereby reducing international incidents such as the booing of other countries' anthems by the Japanese. The legislation also drew condemnation from certain Japanese who were disdainful of their country's actions in World War II. They felt that unless their government issued a formal apology—expressed with "true remorse" for those incidents—they saw no reason to be proud about the flag and anthem. Ozawa saw the passage of this law and a few others in 1999 as heralds of a "bloodless revolution" toward a new future—a revolution that would change Japan's national identity and set up changes to its Constitution.

Within education, a major battleground where the use of the symbols was fought, the reactions were also mixed. The 1999 curriculum guideline issued by the Ministry of Education after the passage of the law decrees that "on entrance and graduation ceremonies, schools must raise the flag of Japan and instruct students to sing the "Kimigayo" (national anthem), given the significance of the flag and the song." Additionally, the ministry's commentary on the 1999 curriculum guideline for elementary schools notes that "given the advance of internationalization, along with fostering patriotism and awareness of being Japanese, it is important to nurture school children's respectful attitude toward the flag of Japan and Kimigayo as they grow up to be respected Japanese citizens in an internationalized society."

In Hiroshima Prefecture, where Sera High School is located, the reaction was mostly negative. As one of the two prefectures directly affected by World War II, education in Hiroshima has leaned left with regards to information regarding the symbols and the Emperor due to the power of native groups, such as the Buraku Liberation League, and teachers' unions. There the passage of the law was seen as an "annoyance", running counter to the prefecture's educational practices and unlikely to be able to resolve its war-related issues.

=== International ===
However, the spokesperson for the mainland Chinese Ministry of Foreign Affairs stated that the bill was an issue for the Japanese to resolve on their own to move their country toward a peaceful future. In Singapore, older generations still harbored ill feelings toward the symbols. The Philippine government believed that Japan was not going to revert to militarism and that the goal of the law was to formally establish two national symbols, which every state has a right to do.

== Political ramifications ==
Members of the DPJ were allowed by party leaders to vote based on their own conscience; the party leadership itself was split. Hatoyama overcame his opposition and voted for the bill, along with DPJ Secretary General and Tsutomu Hata. Kan voted against the bill. With the exception of the DPJ, each party voted strictly along party lines, and none among them broke party discipline. Ironically, Hatoyama wanted to use his vote for the bill as a call to his fellow DPJ members for unity. Half of the DPJ supported the bill, reducing the numbers that would have opposed it and making it easier for the bill to pass. The split of the DPJ vote showed the lack of unity of its members.

Another factor that played into the passage of the bill was the coalition of the LDP, the Liberal Party and the CGP. In the Diet, the union between the LDP and the Liberal Party gave them a majority in the lower house but not in the House of Councilors. The leadership of the LDP considered Ozawa to be a traitor because he left the LDP in 1993, yet the LDP needed him and his party to form a coalition to govern. Although the CGP had a relatively small number of seats (52) in the lower house and had nothing in common with the LDP in terms of policy, it was tempted by the idea of being part of the ruling cabinet and supported the LDP in passing the bill. The Social Democratic Party had to abandon key party platforms—such as their earlier opposition to the symbols, security treaties with the United States and the existence of the Self Defense Forces—to join the coalition. Despite the concessions of the SPDJ, the LDP did not advance any of the traditional platforms championed by the SPDJ. Eventually, those policies advocated by the SPDJ were removed from the national policy debate. The only party that stuck to its stance throughout the debate was the Communist Party; the CGP (New Komeito), Liberal Party and SDPJ switched sides to support the bill.

Such vote switching led a writer for The Japan Times to question the rationality of the country's politics over the passage of the bill. The act is one of the most controversial laws passed by the Diet since the 1992 Law Concerning Cooperation for United Nations Peacekeeping Operations and Other Operations, also known as the "International Peace Cooperation Law" which committed Japan to United Nations peacekeeping operations, a deviation from Article 9 of the Japanese Constitution, which calls on the country to renounce the "use of force as means of settling international disputes."

== Enforcement and lawsuits ==
When the law was passed, Prime Minister Obuchi and other officials stated that there was no intention to regulate the use of the flag and the anthem in everyday life. However, the 1999 curriculum guideline issued by the Ministry of Education after the passage of the Law Regarding the National Flag and Anthem decrees that "on entrance and graduation ceremonies, schools must raise the flag of Japan and instruct students to sing Kimigayo, given the significance of the flag and the song."

In Tokyo, regulations were put in place in 2003. As part of that city's regulations, board or school officials are required to record names of teachers who do not stand or sing, and the flag is displayed facing the students during ceremonies. Sanctions ranged from reprimands, re-education courses, pay cuts, loss of duties to termination; and the sanctions were encouraged by Shintaro Ishihara, the Governor of Tokyo. In 2004, 243 teachers were disciplined and 67 teachers were warned for either not following policies or for instructing their students not to honor both symbols.

One city in Fukuoka Prefecture measured and rated each school on how loudly the students sang Kimigayo, but Tokyo was the only school board that issued large-scale punishments for not following the regulations. According to the Tokyo Board of Education, more than 400 people have been punished since 2004.

Several lawsuits were filed to challenge the Tokyo regulations on grounds that the order violated Article 19 of the Japanese Constitution, granting "freedom of thought and conscience." The Tokyo District Court sided with the teachers, ruling that teachers cannot be forced to stand or sing. However, its decisions are either being appealed or have already been overturned by the Tokyo High Court, which ruled that the order does not represent a violation of the Constitution. Over a dozen lawsuits, ranging from the constitutionality of the Tokyo order to the compensation of the punished teachers, have been filed in Japanese courts. The latest, filed in 2011, was rejected by the Supreme Court; the Court agreed with the Tokyo High Court that requiring teachers to stand for Kimigayo was not a violation of the Constitution. After this ruling, the Osaka Prefectural Assembly passed an ordinance on June 3, 2011, ordering teachers and other school employees in Osaka to stand and sing when Kimigayo is played during school ceremonies.

== See also ==
- List of Japanese flags
