= March of the Volunteers =

National anthem of China

Yìyǒngjūn jìnxíngqǔ
English: March of the Volunteers
- 义勇军进行曲
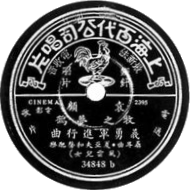
- National anthem of People's Republic of China (Note: Including its two special administrative regions, Hong Kong and Macau.): Military anthem of the 200th Division of the National Revolutionary Army; (1938–1949)
- Lyrics: Tian Han, 1934
- Music: Nie Er, 16 May 1935
- Adopted: January 1938; (200th Division); 27 September 1949; 4 December 1982; (official); 1 July 1997; (Hong Kong); 20 December 1999; (Macau); 14 March 2004; (constitutional); 1 October 2017; (legalised)

Audio sample
- "March of the Volunteers", performed by the United States Navy Band: file; help

March of the Volunteers
- Simplified Chinese: 义勇军进行曲
- Traditional Chinese: 義勇軍進行曲
- Hanyu Pinyin: Yìyǒngjūn Jìnxíngqǔ
- Literal meaning: March of the Righteous and Brave Armies
Transcriptions
Standard Mandarin
- Hanyu Pinyin: Yìyǒngjūn Jìnxíngqǔ
- Bopomofo: ㄧˋ ㄩㄥˇ ㄐㄩㄣ; ㄐㄧㄣˋ ㄒㄧㄥˊ ㄑㄩˇ
- Gwoyeu Romatzyh: Yihyeongjiun Jinnshyngcheu
- Wade–Giles: I^{4}-yung^{3}-chün^{1}; Chin^{4}-hsing^{2}-chʻü^{3}
- Tongyong Pinyin: Yì-yǒng-jyun Jìn-síng-cyǔ
- Yale Romanization: Yìyǔngjyūn Jìnsyíngchyǔ
- IPA: [î.jʊ̀ŋ.tɕýn tɕîn.ɕǐŋ.tɕʰỳ]
Yue: Cantonese
- Yale Romanization: Yihyúhnggwān Jeunhàhngkūk
- Jyutping: ji6 jung5 gwan1 zeon3 hang4 kuk1
- IPA: [ji˨ jʊŋ˩˧ kʷɐn˥ tsɵn˧ hɐŋ˩ kʰʊk̚˥]

March of the Anti-Manchukuo Counter-Japan Volunteers
- Simplified Chinese: 反满抗日义勇军进行曲
- Traditional Chinese: 反滿抗日義勇軍進行曲
- Hanyu Pinyin: Fǎnmǎn Kàngrì Yìyǒngjūn Jìnxíngqǔ
Transcriptions
Standard Mandarin
- Hanyu Pinyin: Fǎnmǎn Kàngrì Yìyǒngjūn Jìnxíngqǔ
- Bopomofo: ㄈㄢˇ ㄇㄢˇ ㄎㄤˋ ㄖˋ ㄧˋ ㄩㄥˇ ㄐㄩㄣ ㄐㄧㄣˋ ㄒㄧㄥˊ ㄑㄩˇ
- Wade–Giles: Fan^{3}-man^{3} Kʻang^{4}-jih^{4} I^{4}-yung^{3}-chün^{1} Chin^{4}-hsing^{2}-chʻü^{3}
- Tongyong Pinyin: Fǎn-mǎn Kàng-rìh Yì-yǒng-jyun Jìn-síng-cyǔ
- IPA: [fàn.màn kʰâŋ.ɻɻ̩̂ î.jʊ̀ŋ.tɕýn tɕîn.ɕǐŋ.tɕʰỳ]

National Anthem of the People's Republic of China
- Simplified Chinese: 中华人民共和国国歌
- Traditional Chinese: 中華人民共和國國歌
- Hanyu Pinyin: Zhōnghuá Rénmín; Gònghéguó Guógē
Transcriptions
Standard Mandarin
- Hanyu Pinyin: Zhōnghuá Rénmín; Gònghéguó Guógē
- Bopomofo: ㄓㄨㄥ ㄏㄨㄚˊ; ㄖㄣˊ ㄇㄧㄣˊ; ㄍㄨㄥˋ ㄏㄜˊ ㄍㄨㄛˊ; ㄍㄨㄛˊ ㄍㄜ
- Gwoyeu Romatzyh: Jonghwa Renmin; Gonqhergwo Gwoge
- Wade–Giles: Chung^{1}-hua^{2} Jen^{2}-min^{2}
- Tongyong Pinyin: Jhong-huá Rén-mín; Gòng-hé-guó Guó-gē
- Yale Romanization: Jūnghwá Rénmín; Gùnghégwó Gwógē
- IPA: Mandarin pronunciation: [ʈʂʊ́ŋ.xwǎ ɻə̌n.mǐn]
Yue: Cantonese
- Yale Romanization: Jūng'wàh Yàhnmàhn Guhng'wòhgwok Gwokgō
- Jyutping: zung1 waa4 jan4 man4 gung6 wo4 gwok3 gwok3 go1
- IPA: [tsʊŋ˥ wa˩ jɐn˩ mɐn˩ kʊŋ˨ wɔ˩ kʷɔk̚˧ kʷɔk̚˧ kɔ˥]

The "March of the Volunteers" is the national anthem of the People's Republic of China. Unlike previous Chinese state anthems, it was written entirely in vernacular Chinese, rather than in Classical Chinese.

The Japanese invasion of Manchuria saw a boom of nationalistic arts and literature in China. This song had its lyrics written first by the communist playwright Tian Han in 1934, then set to melody by Nie Er and arranged by Aaron Avshalomov for the communist-aligned film Children of Troubled Times (1935). It became a famous military song during the Second Sino-Japanese War beyond the Chinese Communist Party, most notably the Nationalist general Dai Anlan designated it to be the anthem of the 200th Division, who fought in Burma. It was adopted as the PRC's provisional anthem in 1949 in place of the "Three Principles of the People" of the Republic of China and the Communist "Internationale".

During the Cultural Revolution, Tian Han was criticized and placed in prison, where he died in 1968. The song was briefly and unofficially replaced by "The East Is Red", then reinstated but played without lyrics, restored to official status in 1978 with altered lyrics, before the original version was fully restored in 1982. In 2004, the March of the Volunteers was enshrined as the national anthem in the constitution. In 2017, the Law of the People's Republic of China on the National Anthem was adopted.

== History ==
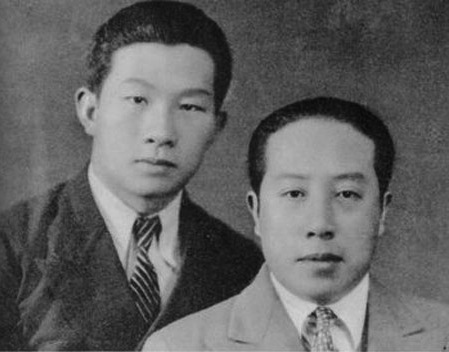
Nie Er (left) and Tian Han (right), photographed in Shanghai in 1933

The lyrics of the "March of the Volunteers", also formally known as the National Anthem of the People's Republic of China, were composed by Tian Han in 1934 as two stanzas in his poem "The Great Wall" (萬里長城), (义勇军进行曲) intended for a play he was working on at the time. The poem's stanzas were adopted into the song by Nie the composer while Tian was imprisoned. Then the song was chosen as part of the plot's climax in Diantong Company's upcoming film Children of Troubled Times or Sons and Daughters of the Storm. It first appeared in public in the May 1935 screening of the film at Jincheng Grand Theater, Shanghai and two months later in July with Pathé's (a subsidiary of EMI) record release.

The film is a story about a Chinese intellectual who flees during the Shanghai Incident to a life of luxury in Qingdao, only to be driven to fight the Japanese occupation of Manchuria after learning of the death of his friend. Urban legends later circulated that Tian wrote it in jail on rolling paper or the liner paper from cigarette boxes after being arrested in Shanghai by the Nationalists; in fact, he was arrested in Shanghai and held in Nanjing just after completing his draft for the film. During March and April 1935, in Japan, Nie Er set the words (with minor adjustments) to music; in May, Diantong's sound director He Luting had the Russian composer Aaron Avshalomov arrange their orchestral accompaniment. The song plays in the film's concluding scene as the protagonists join the masses in taking up arms to oppose the invading Japanese. The song was performed by actors Gu Menghe and Yuan Muzhi, a future director, along with a small and "hastily-assembled" chorus; He Luting consciously chose to use their first take, which preserved the Cantonese accent of several of the men. On 9 May, Gu and Yuan recorded it in more standard Mandarin for Pathé Orient's Shanghai branch (Note: Pathé's local music director at the time was the French-educated Ren Guang, who in 1933 was a founding member of Soong Ching-ling's "Soviet Friends Society"'s Music Group. Prior to his arrest, Tian Han served as the group's head and Nie Er was another charter member. Liu Liangmo, who subsequently did much to popularize the use of the song, had also joined by 1935.) ahead of the movie's release, so that it served as a form of advertising for the film.

Originally translated as "Volunteers Marching On", the English name references the several volunteer armies that opposed Japan's invasion of Manchuria in the 1930s; the Chinese name is a poetic variation—literally, the "Righteous and Brave Armies"—that also appears in other songs of the time, such as the 1937 "Sword March".

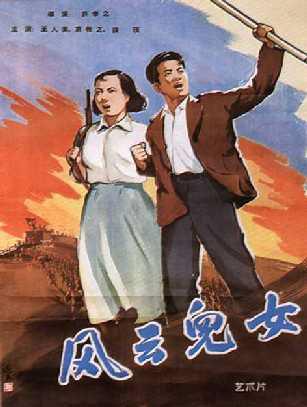
The poster for Children of Troubled Times (1935), which used the march as its theme song

March of the Volunteers in Cantonese language

In May 1935, the same month as the release of Children of Troubled Times, Lü Ji and other leftists in Shanghai had begun an amateur choir and started promoting a National Salvation singing campaign, supporting mass singing associations along the lines established the year before by Liu Liangmo, a Shanghai YMCA leader. Although the movie did not perform well enough to keep Diantong from closing, its theme song became wildly popular: musicologist Feng Zikai reported hearing it being sung by crowds in rural villages from Zhejiang to Hunan within months of its release and, at a performance at a Shanghai sports stadium in June 1936, Liu's chorus of hundreds was joined by its audience of thousands. Although Tian Han was imprisoned for two years, Nie Er fled to the Soviet Union, only to die en route in Japan; (Note: Nie actually finalized the movie's music in Japan and sent it back to Diantong in Shanghai.) and Liu Liangmo eventually fled to the U.S. to escape harassment from the Nationalists. The singing campaign continued to expand, particularly after the December 1936 Xi'an Incident reduced Nationalist pressure against leftist movements. Visiting St Paul's Hospital at the Anglican mission at Guide (now Shangqiu, Henan), W.H. Auden and Christopher Isherwood reported hearing a "Chee Lai!" treated as a hymn at the mission service and the same tune "set to different words" treated as a favorite song of the Eighth Route Army.

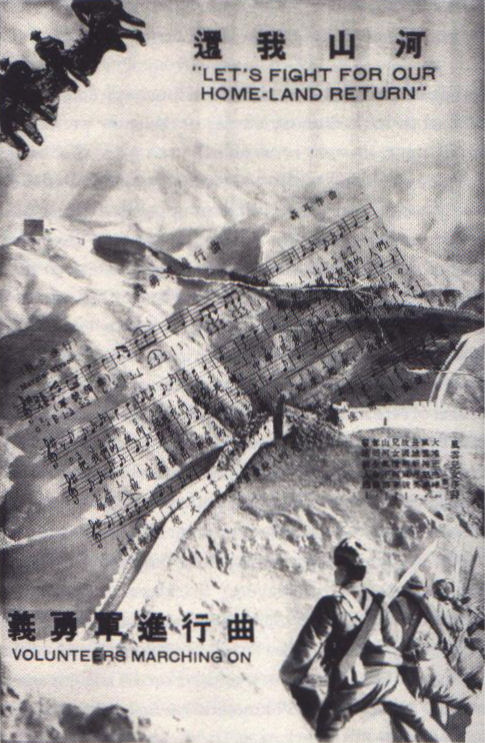
The song's first appearance in print, the May or June 1935 Diantong Pictorial

March of the Volunteers (Pathé Records)

The Pathé recording of the march appeared prominently in Joris Ivens's 1939 The 400 Million, an English-language documentary on the war in China. The same year, Lee Pao-chen included it with a parallel English translation in a songbook published in the new Chinese capital Chongqing; this version would later be disseminated throughout the United States for children's musical education during World War II before being curtailed at the onset of the Cold War. (Note: The lyrics, which appeared in the Music Educators' Journal, are sung verbatim in Philip Roth's 1969 Portnoy's Complaint, where Portnoy claims "the rhythm alone can cause my flesh to ripple" and that his elementary school teachers were already calling it the "Chinese national anthem".) The New York Times published the song's sheet music on 24 December, along with an analysis by a Chinese correspondent in Chongqing. In exile in New York City in 1940, Liu Liangmo taught it to Paul Robeson, the college-educated polyglot folk-singing son of a runaway slave. Robeson began performing the song in Chinese at a large concert in New York City's Lewisohn Stadium. Reportedly in communication with the original lyricist Tian Han, the pair translated it into English and recorded it in both languages as "Chee Lai!" ("Arise!") for Keynote Records in early 1941. (Note: This song was also sometimes spelled as Chi Lai or Ch'i-Lai.) Its 3-disc album included a booklet whose preface was written by Soong Ching-ling, widow of Sun Yat-sen, and its initial proceeds were donated to the Chinese resistance. Robeson gave further live performances at benefits for the China Aid Council and United China Relief, although he gave the stage to Liu and the Chinese themselves for the song's performance at their sold-out concert at Washington's Uline Arena on 24 April 1941. (Note: The Washington Committee for Aid to China had previously booked Constitution Hall but been blocked by the Daughters of the American Revolution owing to Robeson's race. The indignation was great enough that President Roosevelt's wife Eleanor and the Chinese ambassador joined as sponsors, ensuring that the Uline Arena would accept and desegregate for the single concert. When the organizers offered generous terms to the National Negro Congress to help fill the larger venue, however, these sponsors withdrew and attempted to cancel the event, owing to the NNC's Communist ties and Mrs. Roosevelt's personal history with the NNC's founder.) Following the attack on Pearl Harbor and beginning of the Pacific War, the march was played locally in India, Singapore, and other locales in Southeast Asia; the Robeson recording was played frequently on British, American, and Soviet radio; and a cover version performed by the Army Air Force Orchestra appears as the introductory music to Frank Capra's 1944 propaganda film The Battle of China and again during its coverage of the Chinese response to the Rape of Nanking. The song appeared in the Katharine Hepburn-starred film Dragon Seed in 1944, which was about the resistance against Japanese invaders.

Allied radio broadcasts used the song to represent China throughout World War II.

The "March of the Volunteers" was used as the Chinese national anthem for the first time at the World Peace Conference in April 1949. Originally intended for Paris, French authorities refused so many visas for its delegates that a parallel conference was held in Prague, Czechoslovakia. At the time, Beijing had recently come under the control of the Chinese Communists in the Chinese Civil War and its delegates attended the Prague conference in China's name. There was controversy over the third line, "The Chinese nation faces its greatest peril", so the writer Guo Moruo changed it for the event to "The Chinese nation has arrived at its moment of emancipation". The song was personally performed by Paul Robeson.

In June, a committee was set up by the Chinese Communist Party to decide on an official national anthem for the soon-to-be declared People's Republic of China. By the end of August, the committee had received 632 entries totaling 694 different sets of scores and lyrics. The March of the Volunteers was suggested by the painter Xu Beihong and supported by Zhou Enlai. Opposition to its use centered on the third line, as "The Chinese people face their greatest peril" suggested that China continued to face difficulties. Zhou replied, "We still have imperialist enemies in front of us. The more we progress in development, the more the imperialists will hate us, seek to undermine us, attack us. Can you say that we won't be in peril?" His view was supported by Mao Zedong and, on 27 September 1949, the song became the provisional national anthem, just days before the founding of the People's Republic. The highly fictionalized biopic Nie Er was produced in 1959 for its 10th anniversary; for its 50th in 1999, The National Anthem retold the story of the anthem's composition from Tian Han's point of view.

Although the song had been popular among Nationalists during the war against Japan, its performance was then banned in the territories of the Republic of China until the 1990s.

A clip from the film Children of Troubled Times (1935), featuring "March of the Volunteers".

The 1 February 1966 People's Daily article condemning Tian Han's 1961 allegorical Peking opera Xie Yaohuan as a "big poisonous weed" was one of the opening salvos of the Cultural Revolution, during which he was imprisoned and his words forbidden to be sung. As a result, there was a time when "The East Is Red" served as the PRC's unofficial anthem. (Note: Such use continued some time after the March of the Volunteers's nominal rehabilitation in 1969.) Following the 9th National Congress, "The March of the Volunteers" began to be played once again from the 20th National Day Parade in 1969, although performances were solely instrumental. Tian Han died in prison in 1968, but Paul Robeson continued to send the royalties from his American recordings of the song to Tian's family.

The anthem was restored by the 5th National People's Congress on 5 March 1978, but with rewritten lyrics including references to the Chinese Communist Party, communism, and Chairman Mao. Following Tian Han's posthumous rehabilitation in 1979 and Deng Xiaoping's consolidation of power over Hua Guofeng, the National People's Congress resolved to restore Tian Han's original verses to the march and to elevate its status, making it the country's official national anthem on 4 December 1982.

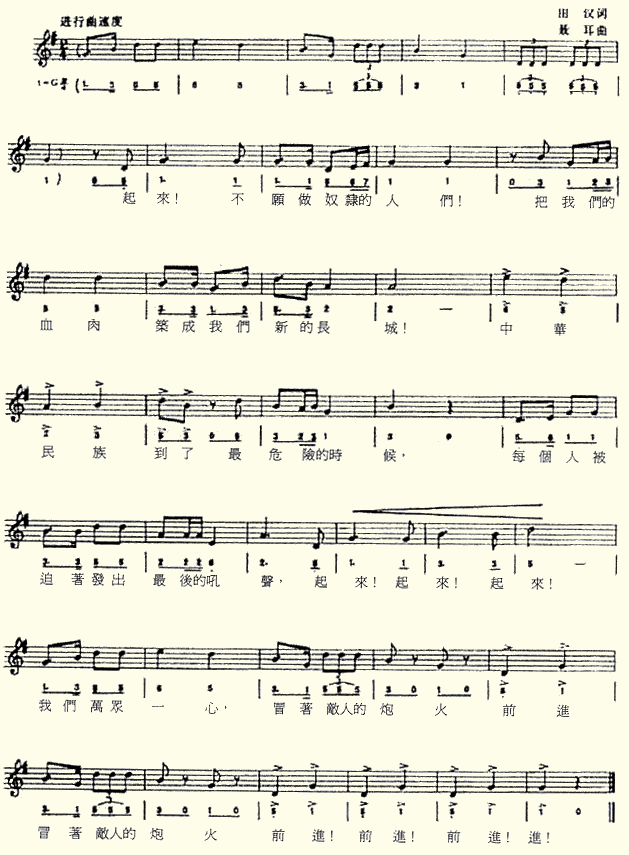
Sheet music from Appendix 4 of Macau's Law No.5/1999

The anthem's status was enshrined as an amendment to the Constitution of China on 14 March 2004. On 1 September 2017, the Law of the People's Republic of China on the National Anthem, which protects the anthem by law, was passed by the Standing Committee of the National People's Congress and took effect one month later. The anthem is considered to be a national symbol of China. The anthem should be performed or reproduced especially at celebrations of national holidays and anniversaries, as well as sporting events. Civilians and organizations should pay respect to the anthem by standing and singing in a dignified manner. Personnel of the People's Liberation Army, the People's Armed Police and the People's Police of the Ministry of Public Security salute when not in formation when the anthem is played, the same case for members of the Young Pioneers of China, China Fire and Rescue, and PLA veterans.

== Special administrative regions ==
The anthem was played during the handover of Hong Kong from the United Kingdom in 1997 and during the handover of Macau from Portugal in 1999. It was adopted as part of Annex III of the Basic Law of Hong Kong, taking effect on 1 July 1997, and as part of Annex III of the Basic Law of Macau, taking effect on 20 December 1999.

=== Macau ===
The use of the anthem in the Macau Special Administrative Region is particularly governed by Law No.5/1999, which was enacted on 20 December 1999. Article 7 of the law requires that the anthem be accurately performed pursuant to the sheet music in its Appendix 4 and prohibits the lyrics from being altered. Under Article 9, willful alteration of the music or lyrics is criminally punishable by imprisonment of up to two years or up to 360 day-fines and, although both Chinese and Portuguese are official languages of the region, the provided sheet music has its lyrics only in Chinese. Mainland China has also passed a similar law in 2017.

=== Hong Kong ===
The anthem now forms a mandatory part of public secondary education in Hong Kong as well. The local government issued a circular in May 1998 requiring government-funded schools to perform flag-raising ceremonies involving the singing of the "March of the Volunteers" on particular days: the first day of school, the "open day", National Day (1 October), New Year's (1 January), the "sport day", Establishment Day (1 July), the graduation ceremony, and for some other school-organized events; the circular was also sent to the SAR's private schools. The official policy was long ignored, but—following massive and unexpected public demonstrations in 2003 against proposed anti-subversion laws—the ruling was reiterated in 2004 and, by 2008, most schools were holding such ceremonies at least once or twice a year. From National Day in 2004, as well, Hong Kong's local television networks have also been required to preface their evening news with government-prepared promotional videos including the national anthem. Initially a pilot program planned for a few months, it has continued ever since. Viewed by many as propaganda, even after a sharp increase in support in the preceding four years, by 2006, the majority of Hongkongers remained neither proud nor fond of the anthem. On 4 November 2017, the Standing Committee of the National People's Congress decided to insert a Chinese National Anthem Law into the Annex III of the Basic Law of Hong Kong, which would make it illegal to insult or not show sufficient respect to the Chinese national anthem. On 4 June 2020, the National Anthem Ordinance was passed in Hong Kong after being approved by the Legislative Council.

== Tune ==
A 1939 bilingual songbook which included the song called it "a good example of...copy[ing] the good points from Western music without impairing or losing our own national color". Nie's piece is a march, a Western form, opening with a bugle call and a motif (with which it also closes) based on an ascending fourth interval from D to G inspired by "The Internationale". Its rhythmic patterns of triplets, accented downbeats, and syncopation and use (with the exception of one note, F♯ in the first verse) of the G major pentatonic scale, however, create an effect of becoming "progressively more Chinese in character" over the course of the tune. For reasons both musical and political, Nie came to be regarded as a model composer by Chinese musicians in the Maoist era. Howard Taubman, the New York Times music editor, initially panned the tune as telling us China's "fight is more momentous than her art" although, after US entrance into the war, he called its performance "delightful".

== Lyrics ==
=== Original version for Simplified Chinese, Traditional Chinese, and English ===
Simplified Chinese
Pinyin

起来(Qǐlái!)！ 不愿(Búyuàn)做(zuò)奴隶(núlì)的(de)人们(rénmen!)！
把(Bǎ)我们(wǒmen)的(de)血肉(xuèròu,)， 筑成(zhùchéng)我们(wǒmen)新的(xīnde)长城(chángchéng!)！
中华(Zhōnghuá)民族(Mínzú)到(dào)了(liao)最(zuì)危险的(wēixiǎnde)时候(shíhòu,)，
每个(Měige)人(rén)被迫着(bèipòzhe)发出(fāchū)最后的(zuìhòude)吼声(hǒushēng.)。
起来(Qǐlái!)！ 起来(Qǐlái!)！ 起来(Qǐlái!)！
我们(Wǒmen)万众一心(wànzhòngyīxīn,)，
冒着(Màozhe)敌人(dírén)的(de)炮火(pàohuǒ,)， 前进(qiánjìn!)！
冒着(Màozhe)敌人(dírén)的(de)炮火(pàohuǒ,)， 前进(qiánjìn!)！
前进(Qiánjìn!)！ 前进(Qiánjìn!)！ 进(Jìn!)！

Traditional Chinese
Bopomofo

起來(ㄑㄧˇ ㄌㄞˊ)！ 不願(ㄅㄨ' ㄩㄢ')做(ㄗㄨㄛ')奴隸(ㄋㄨ' ㄌㄧ')的(ㄉㄧˋ)人們(ㄖㄣ' ˙ㄇㄣ)！
把(ㄅㄚˇ)我們(ㄨㄛˇ ˙ㄇㄣ)的(ㄉㄧˋ)血肉(ㄒㄩㄝ' ㄖㄡ')， 築成(ㄓㄨˋ ㄔㄥ')我們(ㄨㄛˇ ˙ㄇㄣ)新的(ㄒㄧㄣ ㄉㄧˋ)長城(ㄔㄤ' ㄔㄥ')！
中華(ㄓㄨㄥ ㄏㄨㄚ')民族(ㄇㄧㄣ' ㄗㄨ')到(ㄉㄠ')了(ㄌㄧㄠˇ)最(ㄗㄨㄟ')危險的(ㄨㄟ ㄒㄧㄢˇ ㄉㄧˋ)時候(ㄕ' ㄏㄡˋ)，
每個(ㄇㄟˇ ˙ㄍㄜ)人(ㄖㄣ')被迫著(ㄅㄟ' ㄆㄛ' ˙ㄓㄜ)發出(ㄈㄚ ㄔㄨ)最後的(ㄗㄨㄟ' ㄏㄡ' ㄉㄧˋ)吼聲(ㄏㄡˇ ㄕㄥ)。
起來(ㄑㄧˇ ㄌㄞˊ)！ 起來(ㄑㄧˇ ㄌㄞˊ)！ 起來(ㄑㄧˇ ㄌㄞˊ)！
我們(ㄨㄛˇ ˙ㄇㄣ)萬眾一心(ㄨㄢ' ㄓㄨㄥ' ㄧˋ ㄒㄧㄣ)，
冒著(ㄇㄠ' ˙ㄓㄜ)敵人(ㄉㄧ' ㄖㄣ')的(ㄉㄧˋ)炮火(ㄆㄠ' ㄏㄨㄛˇ)， 前進(ㄑㄧㄢ' ㄐㄧㄣ')！
冒著(ㄇㄠ' ˙ㄓㄜ)敵人(ㄉㄧ' ㄖㄣ')的(ㄉㄧˋ)炮火(ㄆㄠ' ㄏㄨㄛˇ)， 前進(ㄑㄧㄢ' ㄐㄧㄣ')！
前進(ㄑㄧㄢ' ㄐㄧㄣ')！ 前進(ㄑㄧㄢ' ㄐㄧㄣ')！ 進(ㄐㄧㄣ')！

English translation
from the Constitutional and Mainland Affairs Bureau of Hong Kong

Arise, we who refuse to be slaves!
With our very flesh and blood,
Let us build our new Great Wall!
The peoples of China are at their most critical time,
Everybody must roar defiance.
Arise! Arise! Arise!
Millions of hearts with one mind,
Brave the enemy's gunfire, march on!
Brave the enemy's gunfire, march on!
March on! March on! On!

IPA transcription

[t͡ɕʰi²¹⁴ laɪ̯³⁵ pu⁵¹ ɥɛn⁵¹ t͡swɔ⁵¹ nu³⁵ li⁵¹ ti⁵¹ ʐən³⁵ mən³⁵]
[pä²¹⁴ wɔ²¹⁴ mən³⁵ ti⁵¹ ɕɥɛ⁵¹ ʐoʊ̯⁵¹ ʈ͡ʂu⁵¹ ʈ͡ʂʰɤŋ³⁵ wɔ²¹⁴ mən³⁵ ɕin⁵⁵ ti⁵¹ ʈ͡ʂʰɑŋ³⁵ ʈ͡ʂʰɤŋ³⁵]
[ʈ͡ʂʊŋ⁵⁵ xwä³⁵ min³⁵ t͡su³⁵ tɑʊ̯⁵¹ ljɑʊ̯²¹⁴ t͡sweɪ̯⁵¹ weɪ̯⁵⁵ ɕjɛn²¹⁴ ti⁵¹ ʂʐ̩³⁵ xoʊ̯⁵¹]
[meɪ̯²¹⁴ kɤ⁵¹ ʐən³⁵ peɪ̯⁵¹ pʰwɔ⁵¹ ɖ͡ʐ̥ə fä⁵⁵ ʈ͡ʂʰu⁵⁵ t͡sweɪ̯⁵¹ xoʊ̯⁵¹ ti⁵¹ xoʊ̯²¹⁴ ʂɤŋ⁵⁵]
[t͡ɕʰi²¹⁴ laɪ̯³⁵ t͡ɕʰi²¹⁴ laɪ̯³⁵ t͡ɕʰi²¹⁴ laɪ̯³⁵]
[wɔ²¹⁴ mən³⁵ wän⁵¹ ʈ͡ʂʊŋ⁵¹ i⁵⁵ ɕin⁵⁵]
[mɑʊ̯⁵¹ ɖ͡ʐ̥ə ti³⁵ ʐən³⁵ ti⁵¹ pʰɑʊ̯⁵¹ xwɔ²¹⁴ t͡ɕʰjɛn³⁵ t͡ɕin⁵¹]
[mɑʊ̯⁵¹ ɖ͡ʐ̥ə ti³⁵ ʐən³⁵ ti⁵¹ pʰɑʊ̯⁵¹ xwɔ²¹⁴ t͡ɕʰjɛn³⁵ t͡ɕin⁵¹]
[t͡ɕʰjɛn³⁵ t͡ɕin⁵¹ t͡ɕʰjɛn³⁵ t͡ɕin⁵¹ t͡ɕin⁵¹]

English translation in Songs of Fighting China

Arise! ye who refuse to be bond slaves!
With our very flesh and blood, Let us build our new Great Wall.
China's masses have met the day of danger,
Indignation fills the hearts of all our countrymen.
Arise! Arise! Arise!
Many hearts with one mind,
Brave the enemy's gunfire, March on!
Brave the enemy's gunfire, March on!
March on!, March on! On!

=== 1978–1982 version ===
Simplified Chinese
Pinyin

前进(Qiánjìn!)! 各(Gè)民族(mínzú)英雄(yīngxióng)的(de)人民(rénmín!)！
伟大(Wěidà)的(de)共产党(gòngchǎndǎng,)，领导(lǐngdǎo)我们(wǒmen)继续(jìxù)长征(chángzhēng!)！
万众一心(Wànzhòngyīxīn)奔(bēn)向(xiàng)共产主义(gòngchǎnzhǔyì)明天(míngtiān!)！
建设(Jiànshè)祖国(zǔguó,)，保卫(bǎowèi)祖国(zǔguó,)，英勇地(yīngyǒngde)斗争(dòuzhēng.)。
前进(Qiánjìn!)！前进(Qiánjìn!)！前进(Qiánjìn!)！
我们(Wǒmen)千秋万代(qiānqiūwàndài,)，
高举(Gāojǔ)毛泽东(Máo Zédōng)旗帜(qízhì,)， 前进(qiánjìn!)！
高举(Gāojǔ)毛泽东(Máo Zédōng)旗帜(qízhì,)， 前进(qiánjìn!)！
前进(Qiánjìn!)！ 前进(Qiánjìn!)！ 进(Jìn!)！

Traditional Chinese
Bopomofo

前進(ㄑㄧㄢˊ ㄐㄧㄣˋ)，各(ㄍㄜˋ)民族(ㄇㄧㄣˊ ㄗㄨˊ)英雄(ㄧㄥ ㄒㄩㄥˊ)的(ㄉㄧˊ )人民(ㄖㄣˊ ㄇㄧㄣˊ)！
偉大的(ㄨㄟˇ ㄉㄚˋ ㄉㄧˊ)共產黨(ㄍㄨㄥˋ ㄔㄢˇ ㄉㄤˇ)，領導(ㄌㄧㄥˇ ㄉㄠˇ)我們(ㄨㄛˇ ㄇㄣˊ )繼續(ㄐㄧˋ ㄒㄩˋ)長征(ㄔㄤˊ ㄓㄥ)！
萬眾一心(ㄨㄢˋ ㄓㄨㄥˋ ㄧ ㄒㄧㄣ)奔(ㄅㄣ)向(ㄒㄧㄤˋ)共產主義(ㄍㄨㄥˋ ㄔㄢˇ ㄓㄨˇ ㄧˋ)明天(ㄇㄧㄥˊ ㄊㄧㄢ)！
建設(ㄐㄧㄢˋ ㄕㄜˋ)祖國(ㄗㄨˇ ㄍㄨㄛˊ)，保衛(ㄅㄠˇ ㄨㄟˋ)祖國(ㄗㄨˇ ㄍㄨㄛˊ)，英勇地(ㄧㄥ ㄩㄥˇ ㄉㄧˋ)鬪爭(ㄉㄡˇ ㄓㄥ)。
前進(ㄑㄧㄢˊ ㄐㄧㄣˋ)！ 前進(ㄑㄧㄢˊ ㄐㄧㄣˋ) ！ 前進(ㄑㄧㄢˊ ㄐㄧㄣˋ)！
我們(ㄨㄛˇ ㄇㄣˊ)千秋萬代(ㄑㄧㄢ ㄑㄧㄡ ㄨㄢˋ ㄉㄞˋ),
高擧(ㄍㄠ ㄐㄩˇ)毛澤東(ㄇㄠˊ ㄗㄜˊ ㄉㄨㄥ)旗幟(ㄑㄧˊ ㄓˋ)，前進(ㄑㄧㄢˊ ㄐㄧㄣˋ)！
高擧(ㄍㄠ ㄐㄩˇ)毛澤東(ㄇㄠˊ ㄗㄜˊ ㄉㄨㄥ)旗幟(ㄑㄧˊ ㄓˋ)，前進(ㄑㄧㄢˊ ㄐㄧㄣˋ)！
前進(ㄑㄧㄢˊ ㄐㄧㄣˋ)！前進(ㄑㄧㄢˊ ㄐㄧㄣˋ)！ 進(ㄐㄧㄣˋ)！

English lyrics

March on! Heroic people of all nationalities!
The great Communist Party leads us in continuing the Long March,
Millions with but one heart pursuing toward a communist tomorrow,
Develop and protect the country in a brave struggle.
March on, march on, march on!
We will for generations,
Raise high Mao Zedong's banner, march on!
Raise high Mao Zedong's banner, march on!
March on! March on! On!

== See also ==
- Historical Chinese anthems
- Flag of China
- National emblem of China

== Notes ==
Preceded by Three Principles of the People (1930–1949 in the Mainland and 1949–present in Taiwan)	National anthem of China; 1949–present	Incumbent
Preceded by God Save the Queen (1952–1997 in British Hong Kong)	National anthem of Hong Kong; 1997–present	Incumbent
Preceded by A Portuguesa (1910–1999 in Portuguese Macau)	National anthem of Macau; 1999–present	Incumbent
