= Nie Er (film) =

1959 Chinese biopic

- Film poster

Chinese name
- Traditional Chinese: 聶耳
- Simplified Chinese: 聂耳
Transcriptions
Standard Mandarin
- Hanyu Pinyin: Niè Ěr
- Wade–Giles: Nieh Erh
- Directed by: Zheng Junli
- Written by: Wang Sujiang; Ling Yue; Zheng Junli
- Starring: Zhao Dan; Zhang Ruifang; Jun Jiang; Sun Yongping; Deng Nan
- Cinematography: Huang Shaofen; Luo Congzhou
- Edited by: Zhu Chaosheng
- Music by: Yan Ge
- Production company: Haiyan Film Studio
- Release date: 12 September 1959 (China)
- Running time: 115 minutes
- Country: China
- Language: Mandarin

Nie Er, formerly romanized as Nieh Erh, is a 1959 biopic of the Chinese musician Nie Er, a Communist Party member who drowned in Japan during his flight to Russia away from Nationalist oppression. The story centers on his composition of "The March of the Volunteers", the theme song to the 1935 drama Children of Troubled Times which was later adopted as the national anthem of the People's Republic of China. The movie was released to coincide with the 10th anniversary of the PRC's founding.

== Cast ==
- Zhao Dan as Nie Er
- Zhang Ruifang as Zheng Leidian
- Jun Jiang as Su Ping
- Sun Yongping as Xiao Long
- Deng Nan as Lao Jiang
- Zhao Shuyin as Jiang Sao
- Wang Bei as Wan Qianhong
- Xia Tian as Zhao Meinong
- Gao Zheng as Li Tianyin
- Han Tao as Cabaret boss
- Huang Zongying as Feng Feng
- Hong Xia as Gao Tianren
- Guan Hongda as Xiao Chou
- Han Fei as Sun Ying
- Chen Shu as Qian Yele
- Gao Bo as Kuang Wentao
- Zhong Xinghuo as Zhang Shu
- Min Zheng as Film company manager
- Hua Yang as Zhang Weiyuan
- Li Tian-Ji as Examiner
- Yu Fei as Military police
- Mao Lu as Pseudo mayor
- Wen Xiying as Old artist
- Li Baoluo as Wounded soldier
- Cao Duo
- Shu Zhen as Qian Yele

== See also ==
- List of Chinese movies of the 1950s
- The National Anthem, the 1999 film retelling the same story from Tian Han's point of view
