= Kimigayo =

National anthem of Japan

English: His Majesty's Reign
- 君(きみ) が 代(よ)
- Score of "Kimigayo"
- National anthem of Japan
- Lyrics: waka poem, Heian period (794–1185)
- Music: Original version: John William Fenton, 1869; Current version: Yoshiisa Oku and Akimori Hayashi (arranged by Franz Eckert), 1880
- Adopted: 1869 (original music); 1870 (lyrics); 3 November 1880 (current music)
- Readopted: 13 August 1999 (law)

Audio sample
- U.S. Navy Band instrumental version in D minor: file; help

1930 orchestral and choral vocal recording
Performed by the Toyama Army School Military Band

"Kimigayo" (君が代; lit. 'your reign') is the national anthem of Japan. The lyrics are from a waka poem written by an unnamed author in the Heian period (794–1185), making the lyrics of "Kimigayo" the oldest lyrics of any national anthem. The current melody was chosen in 1880, replacing an unpopular melody composed by John William Fenton in 1869. While the title "Kimigayo" is usually translated as "His Majesty's Reign", no official translation of the title or lyrics have been established in law.

From 1888 to 1945, "Kimigayo" served as the national anthem of the Empire of Japan. When the Empire accepted the Potsdam Declaration and came under Allied occupation, Emperor Shōwa (Hirohito) retained the throne, and "Kimigayo" remained the de facto national anthem to preserve the Japanese monarchy. The 1999 Act on National Flag and Anthem officially recognized it as the national anthem.

== Etymology ==
The pronoun kimi (君) has been used to indicate the Emperor of Japan or one's lord (i.e., master) since at least the Heian period. For example, the protagonist Hikaru Genji (光源氏) of the Tale of Genji is also called 'Hikaru no Kimi' (光の君) or 'Hikaru-gimi' (光君). Before the Nara period, the emperor was often called ohkimi ("great lord"), so it is controversial whether or not the word kimi in Kimigayo had the specific original meaning of "emperor". Kimi also means "my dear" as Empress Genmei wrote about her late consort in a poem in Man'yōshū (vol. 1, no. 78).

In the Kamakura period, "Kimigayo" was used as a festive song among samurai, and then became popular among the people in the Edo period. In the later part of the Edo period, "Kimigayo" was used in the Ōoku (harem of Edo Castle, now the Tokyo Imperial Palace) and Satsuma-han (current Kagoshima Prefecture) as a common festive New Year song. In those contexts, kimi never referred to the emperor but the Tokugawa shōgun, the Shimazu clan as rulers of the Satsuma-han, guests of honour, or all members of a festive drinking party. After the Meiji Restoration, samurai from Satsuma-han controlled the Imperial Japanese government, and they adopted "Kimigayo" as the national anthem of Japan. From this time until the Japanese defeat at the end of World War II, "Kimigayo" was understood to mean the long reign of the Emperor. With the adoption of the Constitution of Japan in 1947, the Emperor became no longer a sovereign who ruled by divine right, but a human who is a symbol of the state and of the unity of the people as a constitutional monarch. The Ministry of Education did not give any new meanings for "Kimigayo" after the war; this allowed the song to mean the Japanese people. The Ministry also did not formally renounce the pre-war meaning of "Kimigayo".

In 1999, during the deliberations of the Act on National Flag and Anthem, the official definition of 'Kimi' or 'Kimi-ga-yo' was questioned repeatedly. The first suggestion, which was given by Chief Cabinet Secretary Hiromu Nonaka, stated that kimi meant the "Emperor as the symbol of Japan", and that the entire lyrics wish for the peace and prosperity of Japan. He referred to the new status of the emperor as established in Article 1 of the Constitution of Japan as the main reason for these suggestions. During the same session, Prime Minister Keizō Obuchi (Obuchi Cabinet) confirmed this meaning with a statement on 29 June 1999:

'Kimi' indicates the Emperor, who is the symbol of the State and of the unity of the people, and whose position is derived from the consensus-based will of Japanese citizens, with whom sovereign power resides. And, the phrase 'Kimigayo' indicates our State, Japan, which has the Emperor enthroned as the symbol of the State and of the unity of the people by the consensus-based will of Japanese citizens. And it is reasonable to take the lyric of "Kimigayo" to mean the wish for the lasting prosperity and peace of such country of ours.

Parties opposed to the Liberal Democratic Party, which was in control of the government during the Obuchi ministry, strongly objected to the government's meaning of 'kimi' and 'kimigayo'. Lawmakers of the Democratic Party of Japan argued on the grounds there was a lack of any historical ties to the meaning. The strongest critic was Kazuo Shii, the chairman of the Communist Party of Japan, who strongly claimed that "Japan" could not be derived from "Kimigayo", because the lyrics only mention wishing for the emperor to have a long reign. Shii also objected to the use of the song as the national anthem, saying an anthem about the emperor was not appropriate for a democratic nation.

== History ==
=== Empire of Japan (1868–1945) ===
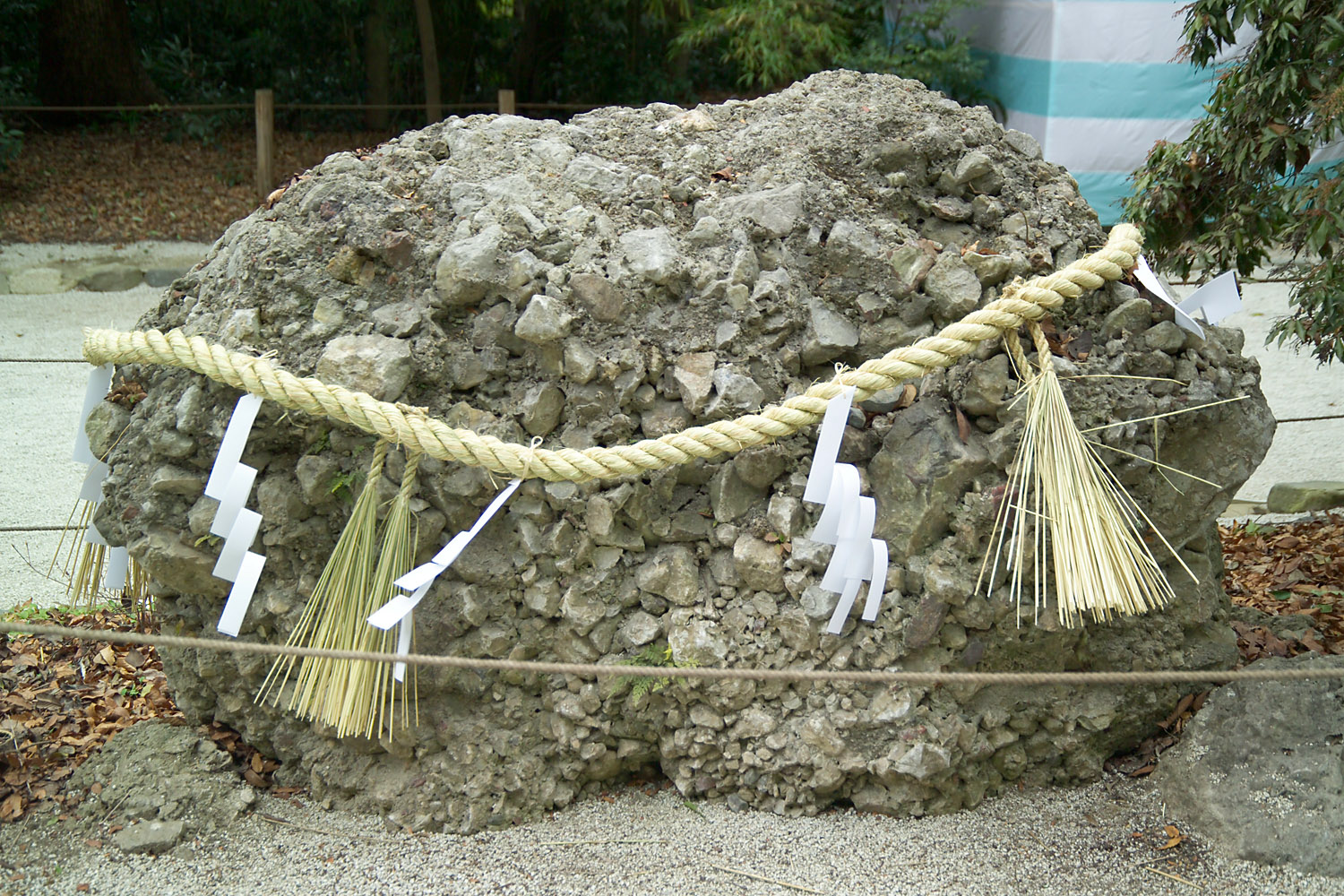
Sazare-ishi pebbles are believed to grow into boulders in some legends (at Shimogamo Shrine in Kyoto)

The lyrics first appeared in the Kokin Wakashū, a poetry anthology published in ca. 920, as an anonymous poem. The poem was included in many anthologies, and was used in a later period as a celebration song of a long life by people of all social statures. Unlike the form used for the current national anthem, the poem originally began with Waga Kimi wa ('my lord') instead of Kimiga yo wa ('my lord's reign'). The first lyrics were changed during the Kamakura period, while the rest of the lyrics stayed the same. Because the lyrics were sung on informal occasions, such as birthdays, there was no sheet music for it until the 19th century.

In 1869, John William Fenton, bandmaster of a British military band in Yokohama, realized that there was no national anthem in Japan, and suggested to Iwao Ōyama, an officer of the Satsuma domain, that one be created. Ōyama agreed, and selected the lyrics. The lyrics may have been chosen for their similarity to the British national anthem, due to Fenton's influence. After selecting the anthem's lyrics, Ōyama then asked Fenton to create the melody. After being given just two to three weeks to compose the melody, and only a few days to rehearse, Fenton debuted the anthem before the Japanese Emperor in 1870. This was the first version of "Kimigayo". This was discarded because the melody "lacked solemnity", according to the Japanese government, although others believe it is because the melody was actually "unsingable" for the Japanese. However, this version is still performed annually at the Myōkōji temple in Yokohama, where Fenton served as a military band leader. Myōkōji serves as a memorial to him.

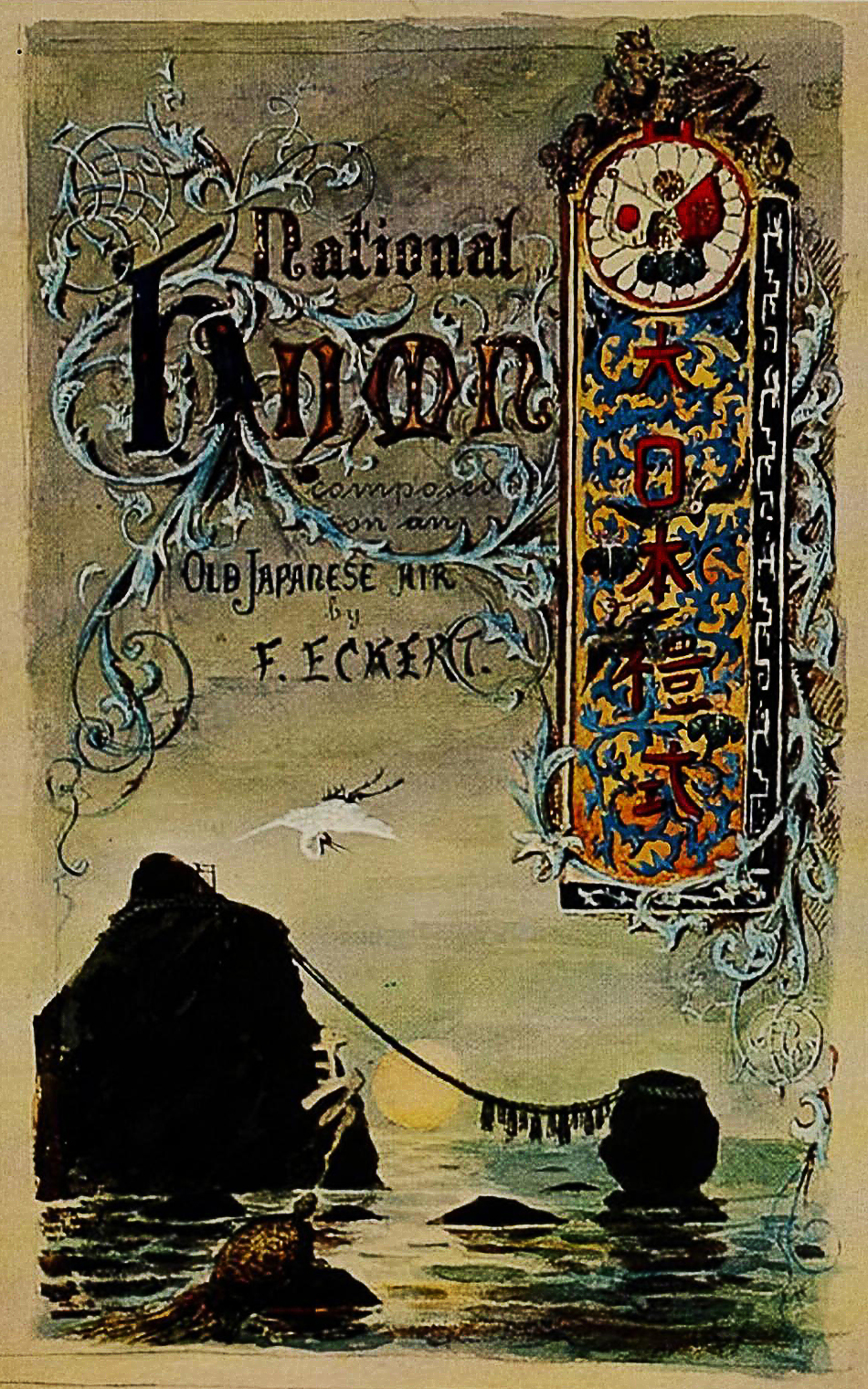
Franz Eckert's notes, presented to the Emperor Meiji in 1880 (cover design by Curt Netto)

In 1880, the Ministry of the Imperial Household (current Imperial Household Agency) adopted a new melody composed by Yoshiisa Oku and Akimori Hayashi. The composer is often listed as Hiromori Hayashi, who was their supervisor and Akimori's father. Akimori was also one of Fenton's pupils. Although the melody is based on a traditional mode of Japanese court music, it is composed in a mixed style influenced by Western hymns, and uses some elements of the Fenton arrangement. The German musician Franz Eckert applied the melody with Western style harmony, creating the second and current version of "Kimigayo". The government formally adopted "Kimigayo" as the national anthem in 1888 and had copies of the music and lyrics sent overseas for diplomatic ceremonies. By 1893, "Kimigayo" was included in public school ceremonies due to the efforts of the then Ministry of Education.

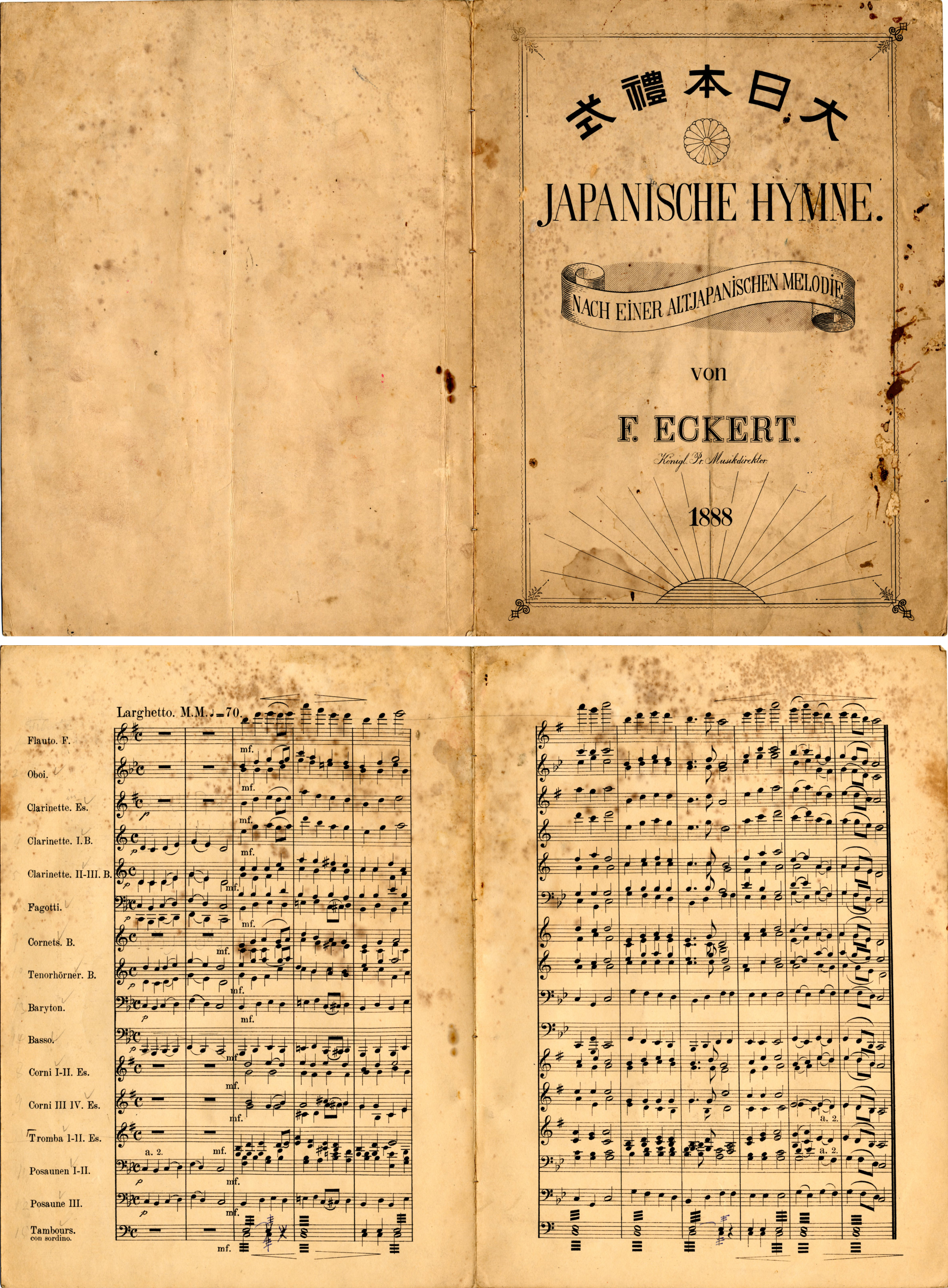
Kimigayo sheet music, 1888

Kōzō Yoshimoto (吉本光蔵, 1863–1907) composed the Kimigayo March (君が代行進曲) based on the anthem and another composition called "Defense of the Japanese Empire" (皇国の守り) by Isawa Shūji. The march is still performed by the Japan Maritime Self-Defense Force band.

At the turn of the 20th century, "Kimigayo" was beginning to be closely associated with the idea of honouring the Emperor. It was also associated as a part of Japanese education. However, opinions expressed in an Osaka paper in 1904 calls "Kimigayo" a song for the imperial family and not the state as a whole. Uchimura Kanzō, a Christian leader in Japan, stated at the turn of the 20th century that "Kimigayo" is not the anthem of Japan by saying the song's purpose is to praise the emperor. According to Kanzo, a national anthem should express the feelings of the people, and not of the divine emperor. The Japanese were not familiar with "Kimigayo" as the anthem until there was a surge of celebrations after victories in the First Sino-Japanese and Russo-Japanese Wars. Previously, papers were critical of fellow Japanese who could not sing "Kimigayo" properly at ceremonies overseas.

During World War II, the Japanese Empire ordered that schoolchildren, both from its homeland and its colonies, were to sing the "Kimigayo" anthem and salute Emperor Hirohito every morning.

=== Postwar Japan (1945–present) ===
==== 1945 to 1999 ====
During the Allied occupation of Japan (led mainly by the United States), there were no directives by the Supreme Commander for the Allied Powers to restrict the use of "Kimigayo" by the Japanese government. This was different from the regulations issued that restricted the use of the Hinomaru flag. Along with the encouragement to use "Kimigayo" in the schools to promote defence education and patriotism, the national broadcaster NHK began to use the song to announce the start and ending of its programming.

==== Since 1999 ====
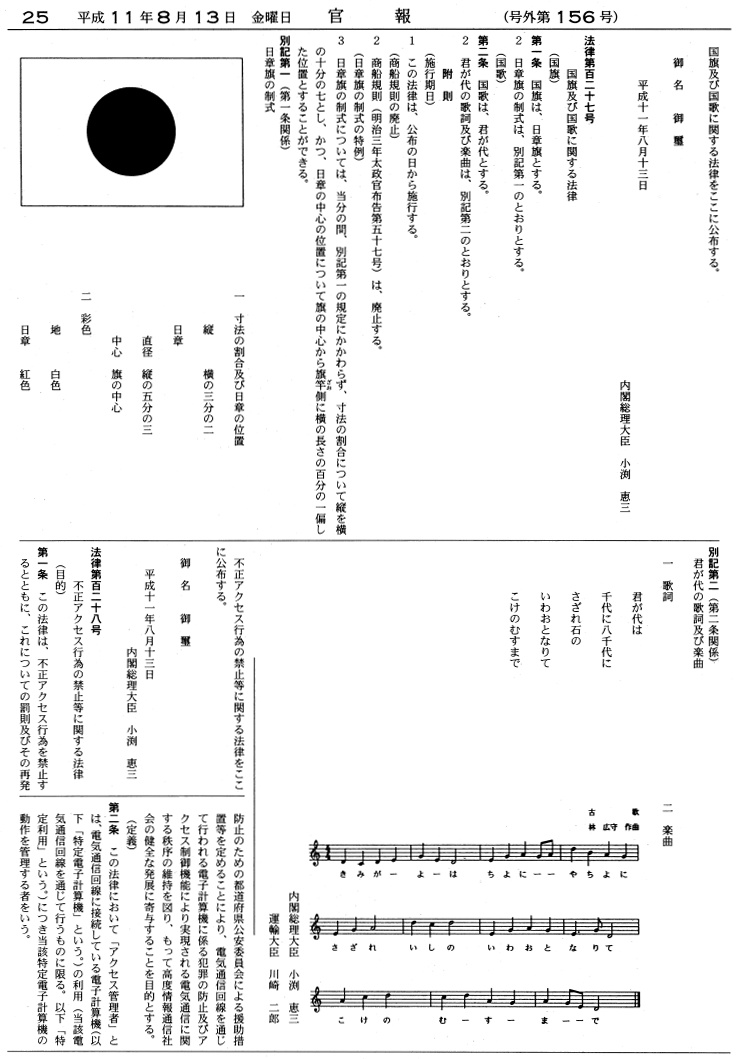
The Act on National Flag and Anthem (Japan) as it appears in the Official Gazette on 15 August 1999

The "Act on National Flag and Anthem" was passed on 13 August 1999, choosing both the Hinomaru and "Kimigayo" as Japan's national symbols. The passage of the law stemmed from a suicide of a school principal in Hiroshima who could not resolve a dispute between his school board and his teachers over the use of the Hinomaru and "Kimigayo".

Prime Minister Keizō Obuchi, President of the Liberal Democratic Party (LDP) decided to draft legislation to make the Hinomaru and "Kimigayo" official symbols of Japan in 2000. His Chief Cabinet Secretary, Hiromu Nonaka, wanted the legislation to be completed by the 10th anniversary of the coronation of Akihito as Emperor. This is not the first time legislation was considered for establishing both symbols as official. In 1974, with the backdrop of the 1972 return of Okinawa Prefecture to Japan from the U.S. and the 1973 oil crisis, Prime Minister Kakuei Tanaka hinted at a law being passed legalizing both symbols.

The main supporters of the bill were governing parties, the LDP and the Komeito, while the opposition included the Social Democratic Party (SDPJ) and Communist Party (JCP), who cited the connotations both symbols had with the war era. The JCP was further opposed for not allowing the issue to be decided by the public. Meanwhile, the Democratic Party of Japan (DPJ) could not develop party consensus on it. Party president and future prime minister Naoto Kan stated that the DPJ must support the bill because the party already recognized both as the symbols of Japan. Deputy Secretary General and future prime minister Yukio Hatoyama thought that this bill would cause further divisions among society and the public schools.

Before the vote, there were calls for the bills to be separated at the National Diet. Waseda University professor Norihiro Kato stated that "Kimigayo" is a separate issue more complex than the Hinomaru flag. Attempts to designate only the Hinomaru as the national flag by the DPJ and other parties during the vote of the bill were rejected by the Diet. The House of Representatives passed the bill on 22 July 1999, by a 403 to 86 vote. The legislation was sent to the House of Councillors on 28 July and was passed on 9 August. It was enacted into law on 13 August.

== Protocol ==
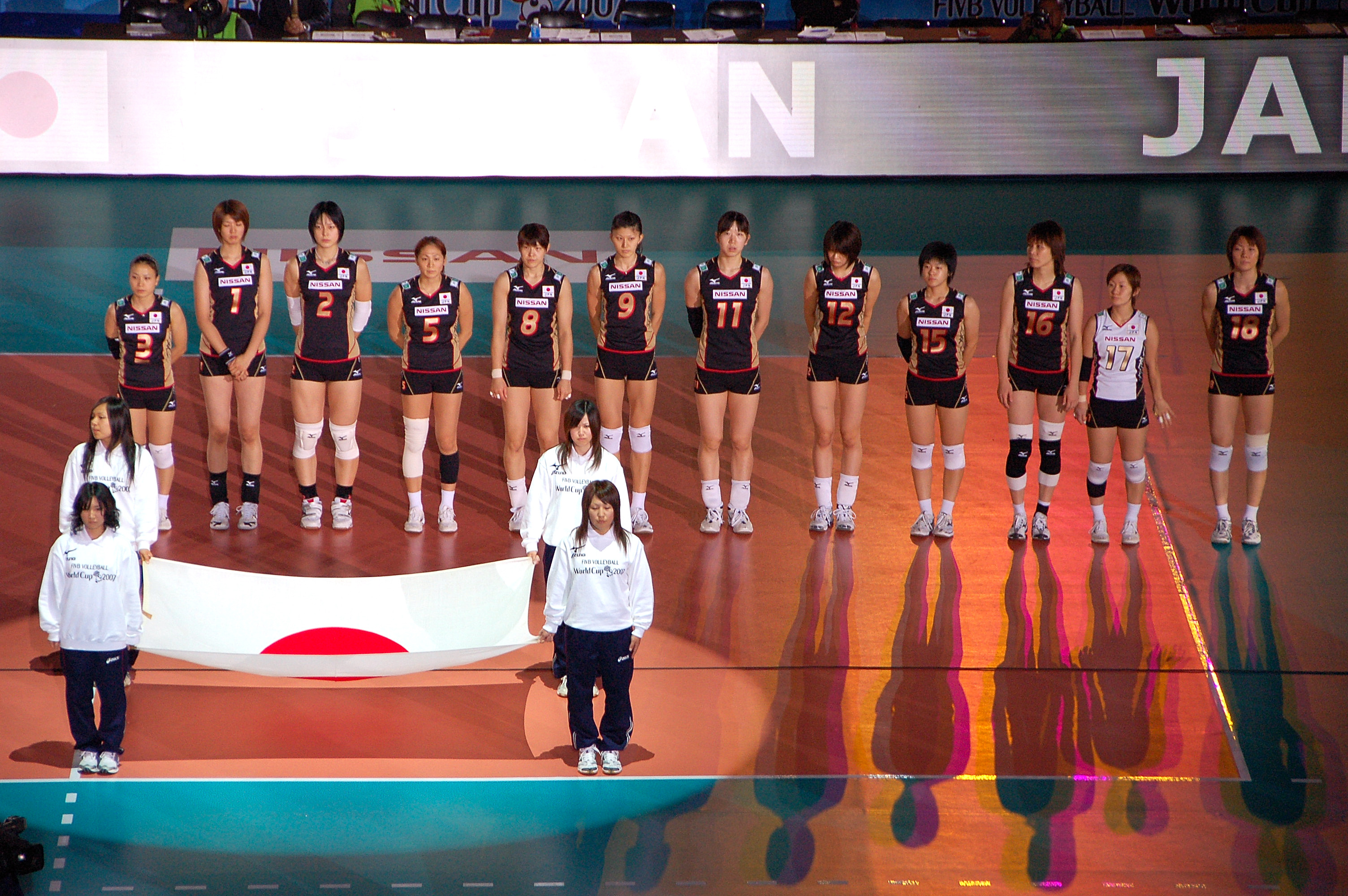
A photo taken on 6 November 2007, as "Kimigayo" was being played before a volleyball tournament in Ōsaka

The lyrics and musical notation of the anthem are given in the second appendix of the Act on National Flag and Anthem. As for the sheet music itself, it displays a vocal arrangement with no mention of tempo and all of the lyrics in hiragana. The anthem is composed in 4/4 (common time) in the Dorian mode. The Act on National Flag and Anthem does not detail how one should show respect during performances of "Kimigayo". In a statement made by Prime Minister Obuchi, the legislation will not impose new regulations on the Japanese people when it comes to respecting the flag or anthem. However, local government bodies and private organizations sometimes suggest or demand certain protocols be followed. For example, an October 2003 directive by the Tokyo Metropolitan Government required teachers to stand during the national anthem at graduation ceremonies. While standing, the teachers are required to sing "Kimigayo" while facing the Hinomaru. The Act on National Flag and Anthem also does not dictate when or where "Kimigayo" should be played. The anthem, however, is commonly played at sporting events inside of Japan, or at international sporting events where Japan has a competing team. At sumō tournaments, "Kimigayo" is played before the awards ceremony.

=== Public schools ===
Since the end of World War II, the Ministry of Education has issued statements and regulations to promote the usage of both the Hinomaru and "Kimigayo" at schools under their jurisdiction. The first of these statements was released in 1950, stating that it was desirable, but not required, to use both symbols. This desire was later expanded to include both symbols on national holidays and during ceremonial events to encourage students on what national holidays are and to promote defence education. The Ministry not only took great measures to explain that both symbols are not formally established by law, they also referred to "Kimigayo" as a song and refused to call it the national anthem. It was not until 1977 that the Ministry referred to "Kimigayo" (君が代) as the national anthem (国歌, kokka) of Japan. In a 1989 reform of the education guidelines, the LDP-controlled government first demanded that the Hinomaru flag must be used in school ceremonies and that proper respect must be given to it and to "Kimigayo". Punishments for school officials who did not follow this order were also enacted with the 1989 reforms.

The 1999 curriculum guideline issued by the Ministry of Education after the passage of the Law Regarding the National Flag and Anthem decrees that "on entrance and graduation ceremonies, schools must raise the flag of Japan and instruct students to sing the "Kimigayo" (national anthem), given the significance of the flag and the song." Additionally, the ministry's commentary on 1999 curriculum guideline for elementary schools note that "given the advance of internationalization, along with fostering patriotism and awareness of being Japanese, it is important to nurture school children's respectful attitude toward the flag of Japan and "Kimigayo" as they grow up to be respected Japanese citizens in an internationalized society." The ministry also stated that if Japanese students cannot respect their own symbols, then they will not be able to respect the symbols of other nations.

== Present-day perception ==
According to a survey conducted by TV Asahi, most Japanese people perceived "Kimigayo" as an important, yet a controversial song even before the passage of the Act on National Flag and Anthem in 1999. However, a poll in the same year, conducted by the Mainichi Shimbun, found that most respondents opposed legislation that make it the national anthem, or thought that the Diet should take more time in passing such a law. Many Japanese students, who must sing the song at entrance and graduation ceremonies, say they cannot understand the old and obsolete language of the lyrics and are not educated on its historical uses. Controversies surrounding the use of the anthem in school events still remain.

== Lyrics ==
Japanese original
Romanization
English translation
Poetic English translation
by Basil Hall Chamberlain
Kanji
Hiragana (Kana)

君が代は
千代に八千代に
さざれ石の
巌となりて
苔の生すまで

きみがよは
ちよにやちよに
さざれいしの
いわおとなりて
こけのむすまで

Kimigayo wa
Chiyo ni yachiyo ni
Sazare-ishi no
Iwao to narite
Koke no musu made

May your reign
Continue for a thousand, eight thousand generations,
Until the tiny pebbles
Grow into massive boulders
Lush with moss

Thousands of years of happy reign be thine;
Rule on, my lord, until what are pebbles now
By ages united to mighty rocks shall grow
Whose venerable sides the moss doth line.

== Controversies ==
Japan's national anthem is controversial due to its post-war history. Schools have been the center of controversy over both it and the national flag. The Tokyo Board of Education requires the use of both "Kimigayo" and flag at events under their jurisdiction. The order requires school teachers to respect both symbols or risk losing their jobs. In 1999, several teachers in Hiroshima refused to put up the anthem while the Hiroshima Education Board demanded that they do so. As the tension arose between them, a vice-principal killed himself. A similar incident in Osaka in 2010 also occurred, with 32 teachers refusing to sing the song in a ceremony. In 2011, nine more teachers joined the rebellion, along with another eight in 2012. Tōru Hashimoto, the mayor of Osaka, stated that "[i]t was good that criminals who are intent on breaking the rules have risen to the surface". Some have protested that such rules violate the United Nations Universal Declaration of Human Rights and the "freedom of thought, belief and conscience" clause in the Constitution of Japan, but the Board has argued that since schools are government agencies, their employees have an obligation to teach their students how to be good Japanese citizens. Teachers have unsuccessfully brought criminal complaints against Governor of Tokyo Shintarō Ishihara and senior officials for ordering teachers to honour the Hinomaru and "Kimigayo". After earlier opposition, the Japan Teachers' Union accepts the use of both the flag and national anthem; the smaller All Japan Teachers and Staffs Union still opposes both symbols and their use inside the school system.

In 2006, Katsuhisa Fujita, a retired teacher in Tokyo, was threatened with imprisonment and fined 200,000 yen (roughly 2,000 US dollars) after he was accused of disturbing a graduation ceremony at Itabashi Senior High School by urging the attendees to remain seated during the playing of the national anthem. At the time of Fujita's sentence, 345 teachers had been punished for refusing to take part in anthem related events, though Fujita is the only man to have been convicted in relation to it. On 21 September 2006, the Tokyo District Court ordered the Tokyo Metropolitan Government to pay compensation to the teachers who had been subjected to punishment under the directive of the Tokyo Board of Education. The then Prime Minister Junichiro Koizumi commented, "It is a natural idea to treat the national anthem importantly". The ruling was appealed by the Metropolitan Government. From 23 October 2003 to 2008, 410 teachers and school workers were punished for refusing to stand and sing the anthem as ordered by school principals. Teachers can also be punished if their students do not stand while "Kimigayo" is played during school ceremonies.

On 30 May 2011 and 6 June 2011, two panels of the Supreme Court of Japan ruled that it was constitutional to require teachers to stand in front of the Hinomaru and sing the "Kimigayo" during school ceremonies. In making the ruling, the panels ratified the decision of the Tokyo High Court in ruling against 13 teachers who had asked for court relief after being disciplined between 2003 and 2005 for refusing to stand and sing the anthem.

Outside of the school system, there was a controversy regarding "Kimigayo" soon after the passage of the 1999 law. A month after the law's passage, a record containing a performance of "Kimigayo" by Japanese rock musician Kiyoshiro Imawano was removed by Polydor Records from his album Fuyu no Jujika (冬の十字架, Cross in Winter). Polydor did not want to attract harassment from far-right groups. In response, Imawano re-released the album through an independent label with the track in question.

== See also ==
- Imperial Seal of Japan
- The king is dead, long live the king!
- Rising Sun Flag
- Ten thousand years
- "Umi Yukaba" – anthem of the Imperial Japanese Navy and the Japan Maritime Self-Defense Force

First None recognized before	National anthem of Japan; 1868–present	Incumbent
Preceded by None (Taiwan under Qing rule)	National anthem of Taiwan; 1895–1945	Succeeded by Three Principles of the People (1945–present, in the Republic of China)
Preceded by Patriotic Song of the Great Korean Empire (1902–1910, in the Empire of Korea)	National anthem of Korea; 1910–1945	Succeeded by Aegukga (1948–present; in South Korea) Aegukka (1947–present; in North Korea)
