= The National Anthem (film) =

- Film poster
- Directed by: Wu Ziniu
- Written by: Fan Zhengming; Su Shuyang; Zhang Zhiping
- Starring: He Zhengjun; Chen Kun
- Release date: October 7, 1999 (China)
- Running time: 100 minutes
- Country: China
- Language: Mandarin
- Budget: ¥20,000,000

The National Anthem
- Traditional Chinese: 國歌
- Simplified Chinese: 国歌
Transcriptions
Standard Mandarin
- Hanyu Pinyin: Guógē

The National Anthem or Guoge (Chinese: 国歌) is a 1999 Chinese historical drama film centered on the composition of "The March of the Volunteers", the theme song to the 1935 drama Children of Troubled Times which was later adopted as the national anthem of the People's Republic of China. The lyrics were composed by poet and playwright Tian Han (played by He Zhengjun) and set to music by the composer Nie Er (played by Chen Kun in his first role). The film is noteworthy for being told from the point of view of Tian, who fell from favor during the Cultural Revolution before being posthumously rehabilitated in the late 1970s. The movie was released to coïncide with the 50th anniversary of the PRC's founding.

The timing and subject matter mirror the 1959 Nie Er, a highly fictionalized version of the same events which did not even include Tian.

The film was directed by Wu Ziniu on a budget of around 20 million rmb. It was a flop, estimated to have lost 9.93 million rmb at the box office; the movie still managed to turn a profit for the Xiaoxiang Film Studio, however, owing to its 9.6 million rmb in subsidies and a million-rmb excellence-in-filmmaking prize at the Huabiao Awards. It also won a special prize from the Golden Rooster Awards and best picture at the Hundred Flowers Awards.

== See also ==
- List of Chinese movies of 1999
- Nie Er, the 1959 film retelling the same story from Nie Er's point of view
