= Bettis Garside =

Bettis Alston Garside 葛思德 (November 22, 1894 – August 1, 1989), better known as B.A. Garside, was an educator, author, and executive administrator for several U.S. charities related to China.

== Early life ==
B.A. Garside was born in Stringtown, Oklahoma and spent most of his early life in the state, receiving his bachelor's degree from the University of Oklahoma. After serving in the U.S. Navy during the First World War, Garside briefly served as the principal of Stringtown High School, before completing a master's degree at Columbia University in 1922.

== Life in China ==
In 1922, B.A. Garside became an education missionary in China under the direction of the Presbyterian Church. He studied Chinese for one year, then accepted a post as a professor of education at Cheeloo University in Jinan, Shandong province. He served in that role until 1926.

From 1927 to 1932, Garside served as secretary of the China Union Universities office in New York City. In his first year, Garside assisted eleven Christian colleges in China in reopening after they had shut down due to political turmoil within the Kuomintang (KMT). Earlier that year, Communist influence in the KMT created conditions leading to closing of several of these schools.

== Chinese relief efforts ==
In October 1932, a new organization, the Associated Boards for Christian Colleges of China (ABCCC) was formed to coordinate fundraising efforts in the United States for the Protestant Christian colleges operating in China. The organization was renamed the United Board for Christian Colleges in China after the Second World War.

B.A. Garside served as executive secretary of the new organization, a position he held until 1941. At the ABCCC, Garside led efforts to promote and raise money to support these colleges, which in the 1932–1933 academic year had combined enrollments of 5,400 students and endowments of US$12 million.

In 1935, Garside received an honorary Doctor of Humane Letters degree from College of the Ozarks.

== Second World War ==
At the start of the Second Sino-Japanese War in 1937, eleven of the twelve member institutions of ABCCC were caught in the war zone, and most were forced to evacuate their campuses to western China. B.A. Garside joined the movement in the United States to raise awareness of the war and encourage other Americans to boycott Japanese goods. Garside directed fundraising efforts for the evacuated Christian colleges, which by 1940 had grown to 13 colleges and enrolled over 7700 Chinese students. $250,000 U.S. dollars were raised by the end of that year. Many of these students and their professors were themselves evacuees from the war, and they would be destitute and unable to continue their education without financial support from the west.

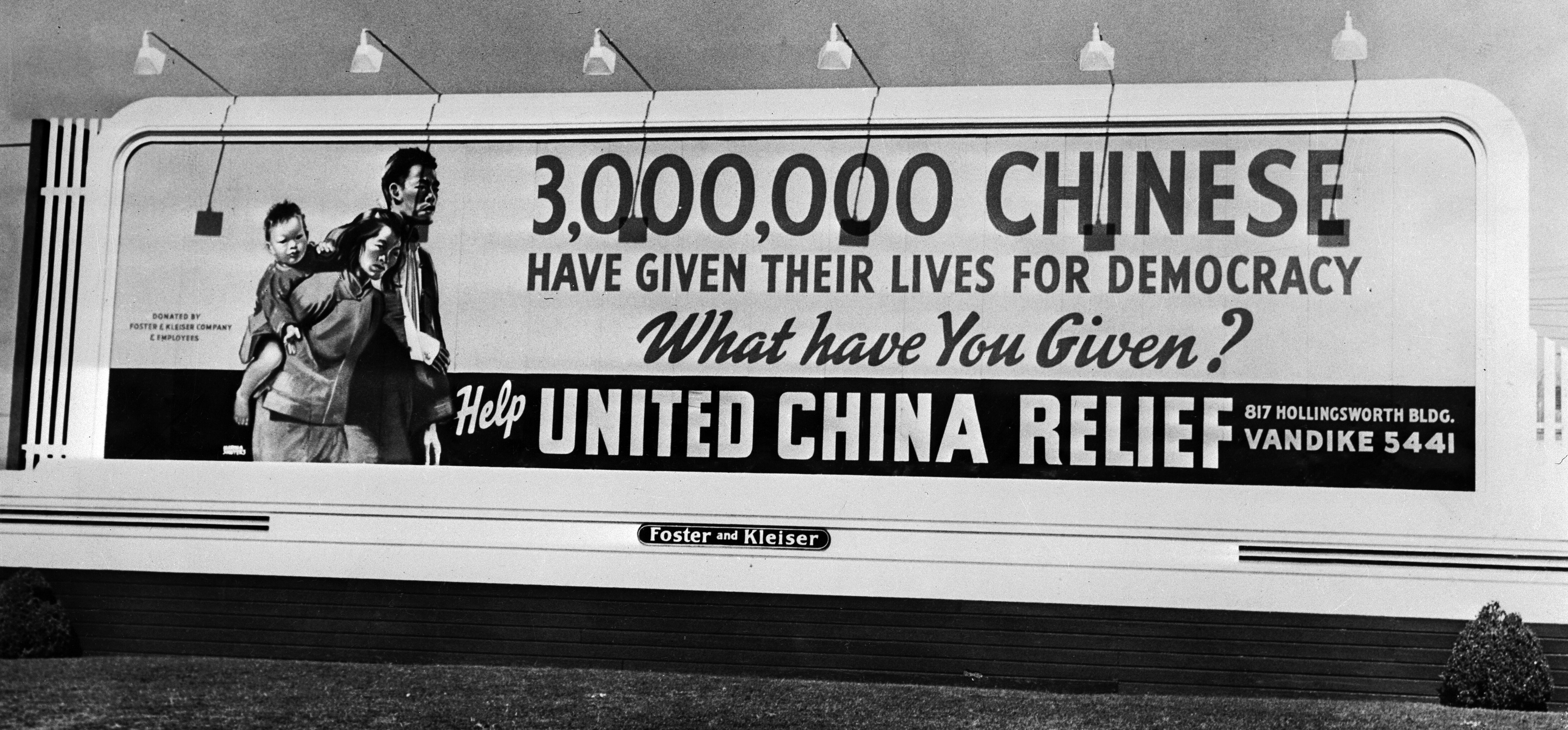
Billboard for United China Relief, Los Angeles, 1942. Their fund drive in 1942 brought in $7 million for relief in China.

In March 1941, the ABCCC joined United China Relief (UCR), a new organization which raised money for several charities operating in China. Other organizations joining United China Relief were the American Bureau for Medical Aid to China (ABMAC), the China Emergency Relief Committee, the American Committee for Chinese War Orphans, the Church Committee for China Relief, the American Committee for Chinese Industrial Cooperatives (also known as INDUSCO), the China Aid Council, and the American Friends Service Committee (AFSC). The new board for this organization included Pearl Buck, William Bullitt, Henry Luce, Robert Sproul, Wendell Willkie, John D. Rockefeller III, Theodore Roosevelt Jr., David O. Selznick, and Thomas Lamont. Eleanor Roosevelt served as honorary chairman. This board appointed Garside as the executive director, and he set out to raise the money needed to help the refugees from the war.

United China Relief was the largest humanitarian effort in the United States to aid the Chinese people up to that time. The organization, which was renamed United Service to China (USC) after the Second World War, raised over US$50 million in donations over ten years. Garside's skill in fundraising was shown by the receipt of over $500,000 by June 1941, a mere three months after the launch of the original campaign seeking $5,000,000.

== Cold War ==
In 1951, B.A. Garside was appointed as the executive director of the American Bureau for Medical Aid to China (ABMAC), and remained in that post until his retirement in 1979.

In the 1950s, while still serving at ABMAC, Garside also served as the executive director of the organization Aid Refugee Chinese Intellectuals, which provided financial and immigration assistance to refugees of the Chinese Communist Revolution. In 1959, Garside and Lowell Thomas organized the American Emergency Committee for Tibetan Refugees, in response to refugee crisis during the 1959 Tibetan uprising. Garside served on this committee until 1970.

Garside was a member of the China Lobby and actively supported the Nationalist China, serving on the Committee for Free China and One Million Against Admission of Communist China to the UN. Garside received the Order of Brilliant Star and the Order of Auspicious Clouds from the Republic of China on Taiwan.

== Published works ==
Garside wrote two books, both non-fiction. The first, published in 1948, was One Increasing Purpose: The Life of Henry Winters Luce, a biography of Garside's mentor and friend Henry W. Luce. Henry W. Luce was another education missionary at the Christian colleges in China, and father of the publisher Henry R. Luce, founder of Time magazine. The second was his memoirs, titled Within the Four Seas, which was published in 1985.

== Personal life ==
On September 21, 1921, Garside married Margaret Cameron. They later had one daughter, Jean. Garside's wife died in 1981.

== Additional Sources ==
- Garside, B.A. (1985). Within The Four Seas. New York: Frederic C. Beil. ISBN 0-913720-58-5.
- "Preliminary papers of B.A. Garside, Hoover Institute Library, Stanford University".
