= John William Fenton =

British musician

John William Fenton (12 March 1828 or 1831 – 28 April 1890) was a British musician and the leader of a British military band in Japan at the start of the Meiji period. He is considered "the first bandmaster in Japan" and "the father of band music in Japan". Fenton is best known for having initiated the process through which Kimigayo came to be accepted as the national anthem of Japan.

Fenton was born in Kinsale, County Cork, in Ireland in 1828 or 1831. His father John Fenton (1790–1833) was born in Brechin, Scotland. Fenton lived in Montrose, Angus, around 1881. He died in California.

== Bandmaster in Japan ==
Fenton, bandmaster of Britain's 10th Regiment of Foot, 1st Battalion, arrived in Japan in 1868. The battalion had been sent to protect the small foreign community in Yokohama during the transitional period at the end of the Tokugawa shogunate and the early years of the Meiji Restoration.

Japanese naval cadets overheard the brass band rehearsing; and they persuaded Fenton to become their instructor. The central band of the Japan Maritime Self-Defense Force traditionally considers this first group of cadet musicians as the earliest of Japan's naval bands. In due course, Fenton ordered instruments from London for his Japanese students.

When Fenton's battalion left Japan in 1871, he remained for a further additional six years as a government advisor (o-yatoi gaikokujin), serving as bandmaster with the newly formed Imperial Japanese Navy and then the band of the imperial court.

== Japan's national anthem ==
Kimigayo, instrumental and vocal rendition
Recording made in 1930 (1m:30s)

In 1869, Fenton realised that there was no national anthem and Japan's leaders were convinced that a modern nation state needed a national anthem. Initially, Fenton collaborated with Artillery Captain Ōyama Iwao, who was the son of a samurai family of the Satsuma Domain and an officer of the Satsuma military forces. Ōyama was well versed in Japanese and Chinese literature, and agreed to find a suitable Japanese poem that could be set to music. Ōyama chose a 10th-century poem that prayed for the longevity of the Lord, usually assumed to be the Emperor. These words became the anthem's lyrics.

The lyrics are said to have been chosen for their similarity to the British national anthem. Fenton had stressed the words and music of "God Save the Queen" as illustrating what a Japanese anthem would also need.

Ōyama is said to have asked Fenton to make the melody for it, but some later complained that there was too much similarity with a Satsuma lute tune. The melody was composed and was performed before the Emperor in 1870. Fenton had only three weeks to compose the music and a few days to rehearse before performing the anthem to the Emperor.

Fenton's music was only the first version of Kimigayo. Fenton's version is performed annually at the Myōkōji Shrine in Yokohama. This shrine is near where Fenton was based as a military band leader.

In 1880, the Ministry of the Imperial Household adopted a modified melody attributed to Hiromori Hayashi. Although the melody is based on a traditional mode of Japanese court music, it is composed in a mixed style derived from Western hymns. Some elements of the Fenton arrangement are retained. In 1879–1880, Franz Eckert, a German musician and foreign advisor, adapted the melody using Western style harmonies. The version developed by Eckert using Fenton's and Hayashi's themes became the second and current version of Kimigayo. The harmonisation and orchestration of Kimigayo is the combined work of these influential bandmasters.

== Later years ==
Fenton's regiment left Japan in 1871, but he stayed for a further six years as a bandmaster with the newly formed Japanese navy and then the band of the imperial court. The cost of his salary during this period was shared by the navy and by the Imperial Palace Music Department (Gagaku bureau).

Fenton's first wife, Annie Maria, died in 1871 aged 40; her grave is in Yokohama Foreign General Cemetery. He married Jane Pilkington in 1872. They left Japan in April 1877, sailing to San Francisco.

The 1881 United Kingdom census records Fenton ("bandmaster pensioner", aged 50) living in Montrose, Scotland, with his Philadelphia-born wife Jessie P. Fenton and daughters Jessie and Maria. At some point, he returned to California where he died on 28 April 1890. He is buried in Santa Cruz Memorial Park.

== Bibliography ==
- Boyd, Richard and Tak-Wing Ngo, State making in Asia. (London: Routledge, 2006), ISBN 978-0-415-34611-5.
- Conant, Ellen P., Challenging Past and Present: The Metamorphosis of Nineteenth-century Japanese Art. (Honolulu: University of Hawaii Press, 2006), ISBN 978-0-8248-2937-7.
- Huffman, James, Modern Japan: An Encyclopedia of History, Culture, and Nationalism (London: Taylor & Francis, 1997), ISBN 978-0-8153-2525-3.
