= Franz Eckert =

German composer

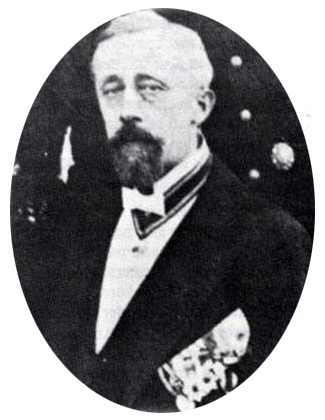
- Born: 5 April 1852; Neurode, Silesia (now Nowa Ruda, Poland)
- Died: 6 August 1916 (aged 64); Keijō, Keiki-dō, Korea, Empire of Japan (now Seoul, South Korea)
- Occupations: Composer, musician
- Known for: Composing the "Kimigayo" and the "Daehan Jeguk Aegukga."

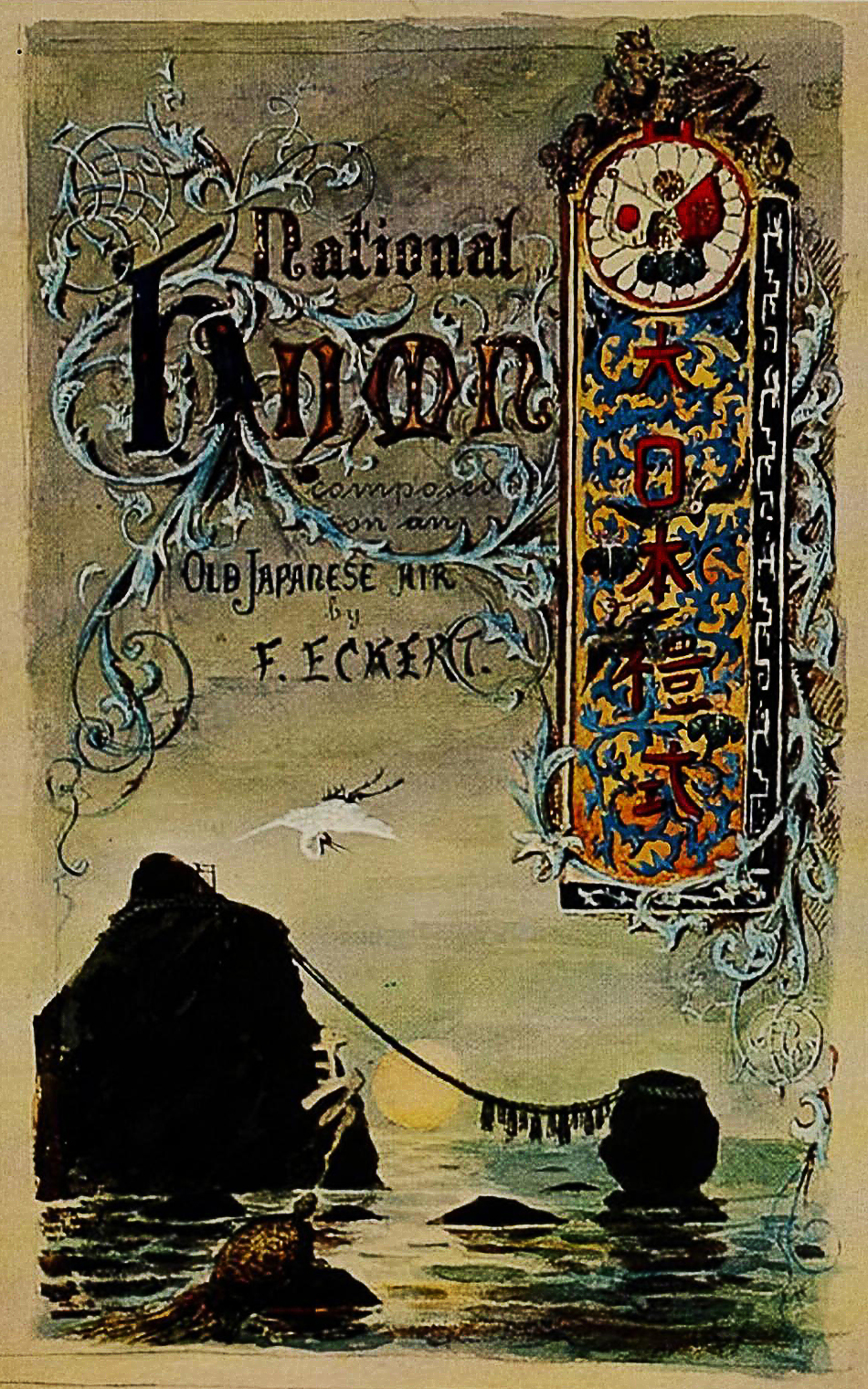
Cover for Eckert's notes of the new national anthem. Designed by Curt Netto in 1880

Franz Eckert (5 April 1852 – 6 August 1916) was a German composer and musician who composed the harmony for Japan's national anthem, "Kimigayo" and the national anthem of the Korean Empire, "Daehan Jeguk Aegukga".

== Early life and education ==
Eckert was a native of Neurode, Prussian Silesia (now Nowa Ruda, Poland), and the son of a court official. He studied in the conservatories of Breslau (Wrocław) and the Royal Conservatory in Dresden, and specialized in military music at Neiße. He received an appointment to become bandmaster to the Kaiserliche Marine at Wilhelmshaven, where he caught the attention of the Japanese government in 1879.

== Career ==
Eckert was invited to the Empire of Japan as a foreign advisor at the behest of the Imperial Japanese Navy. Eckert served as director of the Navy Band from 1879 to 1880. At the time, the need for an anthem was especially pressing in the Navy, as Japanese officers were embarrassed by their inability to sing their own anthem at flag ceremonies at sea. The existing anthem had been created by John William Fenton in 1869. In 1880, the Imperial Household Agency adopted a modified melody attributed to Hiromori Hayashi. Although the melody is based on a traditional mode of Japanese court music, it is composed in a mixed style derived from Western hymns. Some elements of the Fenton arrangement are retained. Eckert rearranged the existing anthem per the Gregorian mode for Western instrumentation, making suitable modifications for playability at sea, including a four-part vocal arrangement. The new national anthem was first performed in the Tokyo Imperial Palace on 3 November 1880, Emperor Meiji's birthday.

Between 1883 and 1886 he worked in the Ministry of Education for the Music Examination Board in the area of wind and string music. However, his most important task was the publication of the books of songs for use in Japanese elementary schools. In March 1888, Eckert joined the Department of Classical Music of the Imperial Household Ministry, established the military band of the Imperial Guards, and founded the military band of the Imperial Japanese Army Academy. He was active in composing ceremonial music for both the Court and for the military, while introducing a variety of Western musical instruments and musical theories on melody and harmony.

In 1897, he was invited to compose a special song, which he titled Kanashimi no kiwami, for the funeral of Empress Dowager Eishō (widow of Emperor Kōmei).

Eckert returned to Germany in 1899 due to ill health, and obtained a posting at the Berlin Philharmonic, but was soon appointed music director to Kaiser Wilhelm II. However, his stay in Germany was short, and soon after his health had improved, he accepted an invitation extended by the Korean Empire to build a court orchestra and to train musicians in European musical instruments and techniques.

Eckert arrived in Seoul on 19 February 1901. His duties in Korea were similar to those he had previously executed in Japan. He soon had a small court orchestra of two dozen musicians established, which he subsequently built up to 70 members. The orchestra performed regularly at the court, but played every Thursday in Pagoda Park for the general public and for the Seoul-based expatriate community, during which performances, Eckert took the opportunity to publicize his own compositions, as well as those of Richard Wagner. Eckert was soon called upon to supply the harmony for the national anthem of Korea, the Daehan jeguk Aegukga which premiered on 9 September 1902. On 20 December 1902, Eckert got 3rd Class of Order of the Taeguk. From 5 April 1902, Eckert was instructor of military band of 1st Siwi Regiment. The new anthem had elements from the works of Wagner, and was played before Emperor Gojong, who was himself a Prussian enthusiast. However, only a few years later, in 1910, Korea was annexed by the Empire of Japan, and the anthem was banned in favor of Eckert's earlier creation, the Kimigayo.

== Later life and death ==
Eckert remained in Korea, but in much reduced circumstances due to loss of his royal patrons. His situation was complicated by renewed ill health, and the outbreak of World War I and, in 1916, he resigned as conductor of his orchestra in favor of his first flautist, whom he had trained as his successor. Eckert died in Seoul from stomach cancer at age 65. His grave is located at Yanghwajin, Hapjeong-dong, Mapo-gu, Seoul. He was survived by his son Heinz Eckert.
