= Law of the People's Republic of China on the National Anthem =

2017 law in China

Standing Committee of the National People's Congress
- Passed by: Standing Committee of the National People's Congress
- Passed: 1 September 2017
- Signed by: President Xi Jinping
- Signed: 1 September 2017
- Commenced: 1 October 2017

Legislative history
- Introduced by: Council of Chairpersons
- First reading: 22–27 June 2017
- Second reading: 28 August–1 September 2017
- Voting summary: 146 voted for; 1 voted against; None abstained
- Status: In force

Law of the People's Republic of China on the National Anthem
- Simplified Chinese: 中华人民共和国国歌法
- Traditional Chinese: 中華人民共和國國歌法
Transcriptions
Standard Mandarin
- Hanyu Pinyin: Zhōnghuá Rénmín Gònghéguó Guógē Fǎ

The Law of the People's Republic of China on the National Anthem is a legislation concerning the regulation of the March of the Volunteers, the official national anthem of the China. It was passed by the Standing Committee of the National People's Congress on 1 September 2017 and came into effect on 1 October 2017.

== Legislative history ==
The proposal to enact a national anthem law had not been taken seriously until June 2015, when the Chinese team and the Hong Kong team were drawn into the same group in the second round of the 2018 FIFA World Cup qualification. At this time, the political relationship between mainland China and Hong Kong have been deteriorating rapidly due to the 2014 Hong Kong protests. The fans of the Hong Kong team had booed the national anthem before every game several times, which led to the attention of the Chinese government and the public to the enactment of a national anthem law.

The Legislative Work Plan of the Standing Committee of the National People's Congress in 2017 included the "National Anthem Law of the People's Republic of China" in the "first review of the bills" and was scheduled to be reviewed for the first time in June 2017. On June 22, 2017, the draft law drafted by the Legislative Affairs Commission was submitted for the first time to the 28th meeting of the Standing Committee of the 12th National People's Congress for deliberation. From June 28 to July 27, the first draft of the law was first solicited for public opinion through the website of the National People's Congress. The first draft of the law consisted of 15 articles, which regulate the singing, broadcasting and use of the National Anthem of China. Its contents included the status of the National Anthem, the occasions for singing the National Anthem, the form and etiquette of singing the National Anthem, and so on.

On August 28, 2017, the draft law was submitted for review for the second time at the 29th meeting of the 12th NPCSC. During this review, most of the contents of the draft were edited and adjusted on the basis of the original preliminary draft. In comparing the previous drafts, only Articles 2 and 12 were the two articles that remained unchanged after the first draft was formulated. On September 1, 2017, the third plenary session of the 29th session of the 12th NPCSC voted to pass the National Anthem Law of the People's Republic of China, and President Xi Jinping signed Presidential Order No. 75 in accordance with the resolution, which was determined to be officially implemented on October 1, 2017 (the 68th National Day).

== Provisions ==
The National Anthem Law

The law sets out rules to use the national anthem. It bars use of the anthem in commercial advertisements, and require attendees at events to stand up straight "solemnly" when the anthem plays. Those who violate the new law, including those who modify the lyrics or mock the song or play it during "inappropriate" occasions, could be detained for up to 15 days or face criminal prosecution.

The full text of the National Anthem Law is mainly for the provinces, municipalities and autonomous regions in mainland China to formulate relevant administrative regulations for specific implementation in accordance with local conditions. For all television and radio media in mainland China, they are subject to the "Notice on Studying, Publicizing and Implementing the National Anthem Law of the People's Republic of China" issued in 2017 by the State Administration of Press, Publication, Radio, Film and Television.

=== Hong Kong ===
On 4 November 2017, the NPCSC adopted the decision to add the National Anthem Law to Annex III of the Basic Law of Hong Kong. In accordance with Article 18(2) of the Basic Law, the national laws listed in Annex III to the Basic Law shall be applied locally by way of promulgation or legislation by the Hong Kong Special Administrative Region (HKSAR).

=== Macau ===
On November 4, 2017, the 30th session of the 12th NPCSC decided to incorporate the National Anthem Law into the Annex III of the Macao Basic Law. In August 2018, the Legislative Assembly of Macau passed the Bill to Amend Law No. 5/1999 on the Use and Protection of the National Flag, National Emblem and National Anthem.
