= National anthem of the Korean Empire =

National anthem

Daehan Jeguk Aegukga
English: Patriotic Song of the Korean Empire
- 대한제국 애국가 大韓帝國愛國歌
- Former national anthem of Korean Empire
- Also known as: (English: Anthem of the Korean Empire)
- Lyrics: Min Young-hwan (Disputed); Gojong (Disputed), 1902
- Music: Franz Eckert, 1902
- Adopted: 1 July 1902
- Relinquished: 29 August 1910

Audio sample
- file; help

- National anthem of the Korean Empire
- Hangul: 대한제국 애국가
- Hanja: 大韓帝國愛國歌
- Lit.: Great Korean Empire Country-loving Song
- RR: Daehan jeguk Aegukga
- MR: Taehan cheguk Aegukka

The "Patriotic Song of the Great Korean Empire" (Korean: 대한제국 애국가; Hanja: 大韓帝國愛國歌) was the national anthem of the Korean Empire during the 1900s. It was the first and only national anthem of a unified Korean state to date.

== History ==
The national anthem was first commissioned by Emperor Gojong in 1901 and presented to the Korean court on 1 July 1902, by German composer Franz Eckert, who was the director of the Korean Empire's military band at the time. It was published in Germany in five different languages (Korean, German, English, Chinese, and French) and performed for the first time on 9 September 1902, during Emperor Gojong's birthday ceremony.

The imminent demise of the Korean Empire's independence, however, meant that the state anthem did not become widely promulgated or available. With the signing of the Eulsa Treaty in 1905, the Korean Empire became a protectorate of the Empire of Japan and in 1910 was annexed outright by Japan with "Kimigayo" replacing the national anthem.

== Lyrics (monarchist version) ==
The original monarchist lyrics have disputed origin; although Min Young-Hwan is a possible author of the lyrics, some historians claim that Emperor Gojong himself wrote the lyrics.

Both sets of lyrics were written in Korean mixed script, as Hangul had recently become the official national script.

=== First lyrics ===
Original Korean

上帝_{상뎨}는 우리 皇帝_{황뎨}를 도으ᄉᆞ
聖壽無疆_{셩슈무강}ᄒᆞᄉᆞ
海屋籌_{ᄒᆡ옥듀}를 山_{산}갓치 ᄡᆞ으시고
威權_{위권}이 寰瀛_{환영}에 ᄯᅳᆯ치사
五千萬歲_{오쳔만셰}에 福祿_{복녹}이 一新_{일신}케 ᄒᆞ소셔
上帝_{상뎨}는 우리 皇帝_{황뎨}를 도우소셔

English

O' Lord Most High (Note: The term "Lord Most High" (Korean: 상제; Hanja: 上帝; RR: Sangje) is a term used in the East Asian cultural sphere to refer to God or a similar deity.), help our Emperor!
May he long live
and heap the beads of longevity!
May he keep his power and influence over the world,
Oh, for ten million years
May his blessings and good fortune be renewed upon him!
O' Lord Most High, help our Emperor!

Modern Korean translation

상제는 우리 황제를 도우사
성수무강하사
해옥주를 산같이 쌓으시고
위권이 환영에 떨치사
오 천만세에 복록이
일신케 하소서
상제는 우리 황제를 도우소서

Like many traditional monarchist anthems at the time, the lyrics are centred on the "longevity" and "blessings" of the Korean Emperor.

=== Second lyrics ===
Original Korean

上帝_{상뎨}는 우리 皇帝_{황뎨}를 도으소서
聖壽無疆_{셩슈무강}ᄒᆞᄉᆞ
海屋籌_{ᄒᆡ옥듀}를 山_{산}갓치 ᄊᆞ으소셔
威權_{위권}이 寰瀛_{환영}에 ᄯᅳᆯ치사
五千萬歲_{오쳔만셰}에 無窮_{무궁}케 ᄒᆞ소셔
上帝_{상뎨}는 우리 皇帝_{황뎨}를 도우소셔

English

O' Lord Most High (Note: The term "Lord Most High" (Korean: 상제; Hanja: 上帝; RR: Sangje) is a term used in the East Asian cultural sphere to refer to God or a similar deity.), help our Emperor!
May he long live
and heap the beads of longevity!
May he keep his power and influence over the world,
Oh, for ten million years
May his blessings and good fortune last forevermore!
O' Lord Most High, help our Emperor!

Modern Korean translation

상제는 우리 황제를 도우소서
성수무강하사
해옥주를 산같이 쌓으시고
위권이 환영에 떨치사
오 천만세에
무궁케 하소서
상제는 우리 황제를 도우소서

There are not many notable changes to the lyrics; the few changes being minor grammatical changes, and the replacing of "be renewed upon him" with "last forevermore."

== Lyrics (republican version) ==
The republican lyrics were re-discovered on 13 August 2004, by curator Lee Dong-guk of the Seoul Calligraphy Art Museum. The surviving specimen was a copy kept by the Korean-American Club of Honolulu-Wahiawa and published in 1910 under the title Korean old national hymn in English and 조선국가 (lit. 'Korean national anthem') in Korean.

The discovery came as a surprise even in South Korea, where the existence of the republican lyrics was unknown until then. The finding was later reported in the mass media and has since then been performed by various K-pop artists. Hawaii has been a source for various pre-Japanese annexation heritage investigations by South Korea since many Korean Empire citizens emigrated to Hawaii before the Japanese annexation. One recent incident involved a Korean Empire émigré descendant donating a very rare 100-plus-year-old original passport issued by the Korean Empire to South Korean president Roh Moo-hyun during his visit to Hawaii.

The republican lyrics are:

Old Korean with hanja added

샹뎨(上帝)는 우리 나라를 도으소셔

영원(永遠) 무궁(無窮)토록
나라 태평(太平)ᄒᆞ고 인민(人民)은 안락(安樂)ᄒᆞ야

위권(威權)이 셰상(世上)에 ᄯᅥᆯ치여
독립(獨立) 자유(自由) 부강(富强)을 일신(日新)케 ᄒᆞᆸ소셔

샹뎨(上帝)는 우리 나라를 도으소셔

Romanisation (RR)

syangdyeneun uri narareul do-eusosyeo

yeong-won mugungtolok
nala taepyeonghago inmineun anlakhaya

wigwon-i syesang-e sdeolchiyeo
doklib jayu bugang-eul ilsinke habsosyeo

syangdyeneun uri narareul do-eusosyeo

English

God, help our nation.
Forever and ever
may our nation be peaceful and her people live in comfort;
may her power and influence spread across the world;
may her independence, liberty and wealth be renewed every day.
God, help our nation.

Modern Korean translation

상제여, 우리나라를 도우소서.
영원무궁토록 나라 태평하고
백성은 안락하여
위세와 권력이 세상에 떨치여
독립 자유 부강을 매일 새롭게 하소서.
상제여, 우리나라를 도우소서.

Romanisation (RR)

Sangjeyeo, uri narareul dousoseo
yeong-won mugungtolok nala taepyeonghago
inmin-eun anlakhayeo
wisewa gwonlyeok-i sesang-e tteolchiyeo
doklib jayu bugang-eul maeil saelopge hasoseo
Sangjeyeo, uri narareul dousoseo

While the copy appearing in the source appears markedly newer than the 1900s and calls it the "Korean national anthem" (Korean: 죠션 국가) instead of "Patriotic song of the Korean Empire" (大韓帝國愛國歌) as one would expect from a 1900s original, it clearly shows pre-1933 orthography (reproduced here) that was not used after the 1940s.

== See also ==
- "Aegukga", the national anthem of South Korea
- "Aegukka", the national anthem of North Korea
