= Education in Japan =

Ministry of Education, Culture, Sports, Science and Technology
- Minister of Education, Culture, Sports, Science and Technology: Yohei Matsumoto

National education budget
- Budget: ¥5.4 trillion
- Per student: ¥2.2 million

General details
- Primary languages: Japanese
- System type: National, prefectural, local

Literacy (2012)
- Total: 99.8%
- Primary: 10.9 million
- Secondary: 3.98 million
- Post secondary: 3.97 million

Attainment
- Secondary diploma: 95.97%
- Post-secondary diploma: 61.95%

Education in Japan is managed by the Ministry of Education, Culture, Sports, Science and Technology (MEXT) of Japan. Education is compulsory at the elementary and lower secondary levels, for a total of nine years.

The contemporary Japanese education system is a product of historical reforms dating back to the Meiji period, which established modern educational institutions and systems. This early start of modernisation enabled Japan to provide education at all levels in the native language (Japanese), rather than using the languages of powerful countries that could have had a strong influence in the region. Current educational policies focus on promoting lifelong learning, advanced professional education, and internationalising higher education through initiatives such as accepting more international students, as the nation has a rapidly ageing and shrinking population.

Japanese students consistently achieve high rankings compared to other countries in reading, mathematics, and sciences according to OECD evaluations. In the 2018 Programme for International Student Assessment (PISA), Japan ranked eighth globally, with an average score of 520 compared to the OECD average of 488. Despite this relatively high performance, Japan’s spending on education as a percentage of GDP is 4.1%, below the OECD average of 5%. However, the expenditure per student is relatively high. As of 2023, around 65% of Japanese aged 25 to 34 have attained some form of tertiary education, with a significant number holding degrees in science and engineering, fields crucial to Japan’s technology-driven economy. Japanese women surpass men in higher education attainment, with 59% holding university degrees compared to 52% of men. MEXT reports that 80.6% of 18-year-olds pursue higher education, with a majority attending universities.

== History ==
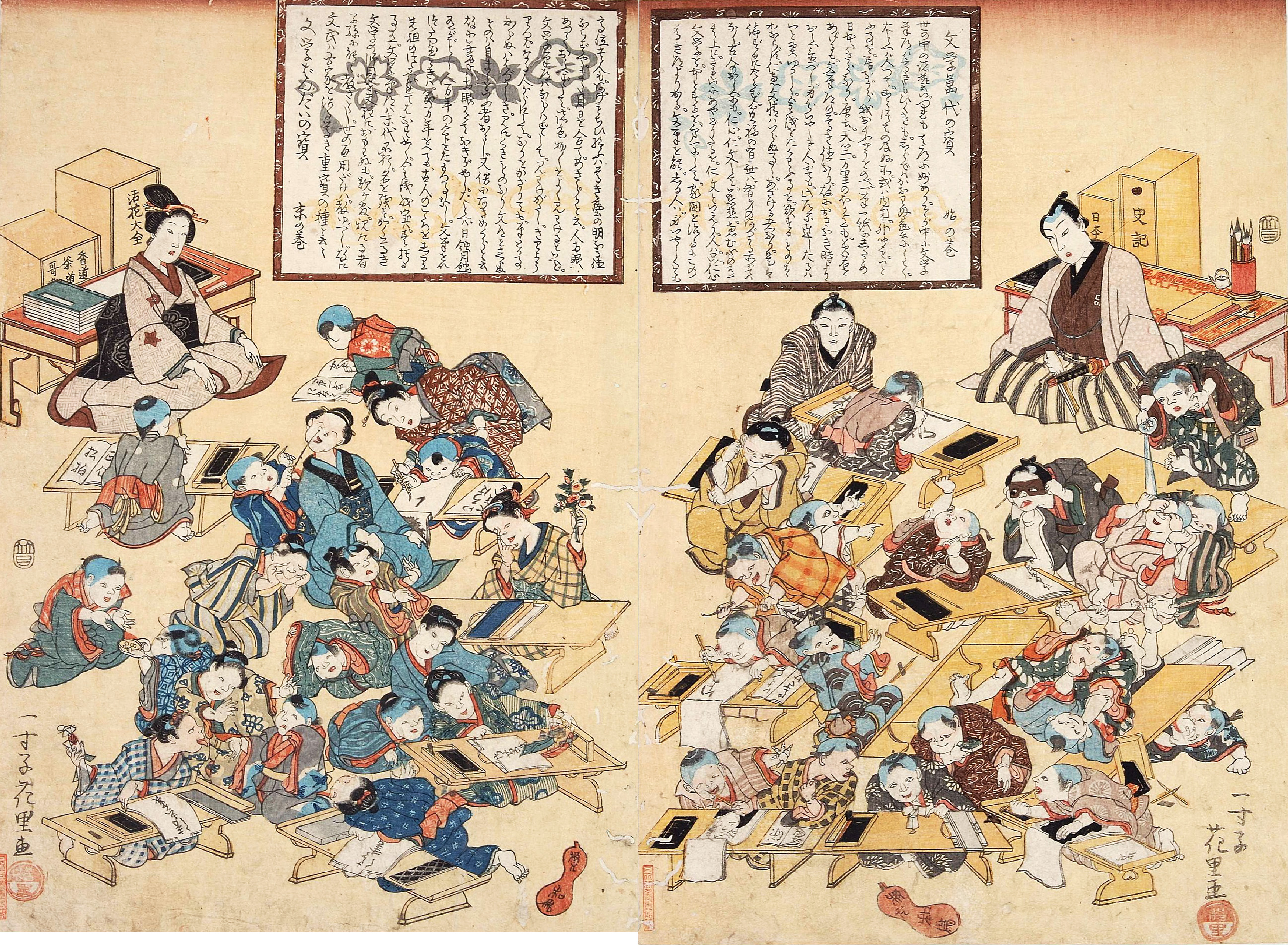
Terakoya, a type of private school during the Edo period

Formal education in Japan began in the 6th century AD with the adoption of Chinese culture. Buddhist and Confucian teachings, along with sciences, calligraphy, divination, and Japanese and Chinese literature, were taught at the courts of Asuka (538–710), Nara (710–794), and Heian (794–1185). Unlike in China, Japan did not fully implement a meritocratic examination system for court positions, and these positions remained largely hereditary. The Kamakura period saw the rise of the bushi (or samurai, the military class) and decline in the influence of the traditional cultured court nobility (kuge), which also reduced the influence of scholar officials based in Kyoto, as samurai spread across the country. However, Buddhist monasteries continued to be significant centres of learning.

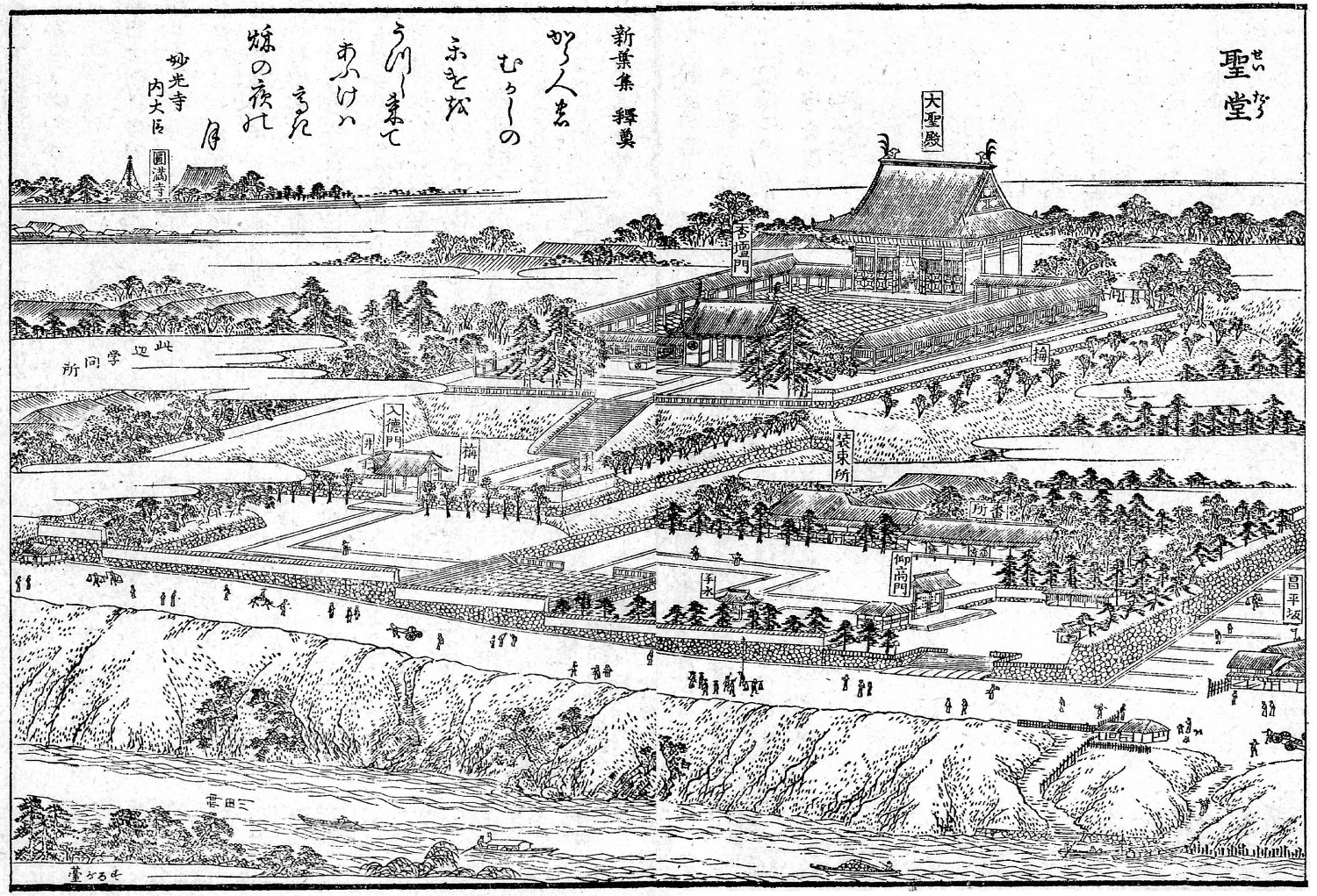
Yushima Seido in Edo

In the Edo period, the Yushima Seidō in Edo (modern-day Tokyo) became the chief educational institution. Under the Tokugawa shogunate, the daimyō vied for power in the largely pacified country. Since their influence could not be raised through war, they competed in the economic field. Their warrior-turned-bureaucrat samurai elite had to be educated not only in military strategy and the martial arts but also in literature, agriculture and accounting. Samurai schools, known as hankō, educated samurai and their children, instilling Confucian values and military skills. Merchants also sought education for business purposes, leading to the establishment of terakoya, which taught basic reading, writing, and arithmetic. Despite limited contact with foreign countries (sakoku), books from China and Europe were imported, and Rangaku ("Dutch studies") became popular, especially in the field of natural sciences. By the end of the Edo period, literacy rates had significantly increased, with about 50% of men and 20% of women being literate. 'Commoners' would also form communal gatherings to try to educate themselves with the help of a scholar. One such, Baigan Ishida, was a great orator and writer who reached the merchant class. There were wakashu-gumi, or youth groups, that consisted of young men ages fourteen to seventeen, who at these groups learned about ceremonies, cooperative living, language, manners, marriage, straw weaving, and world information, not to mention talking and singing.

=== Meiji Restoration ===
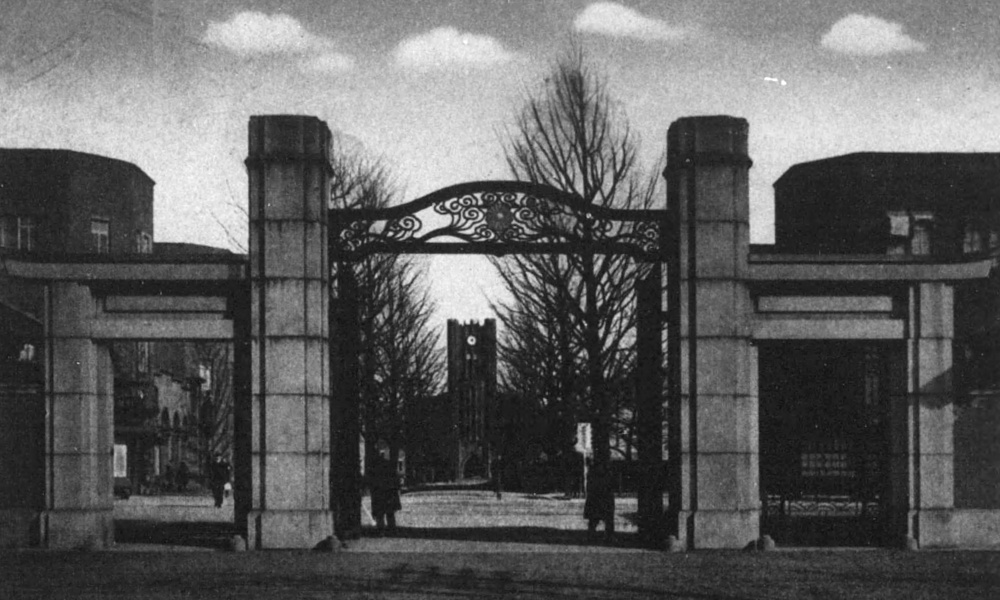
University of Tokyo, Japan's first modern university.

After the Meiji Restoration of 1868, the methods and structures of Western learning were adopted as a means to make Japan a strong, modern nation. Students and even high-ranking government officials were sent abroad to study, such as the Iwakura mission. Compulsory education was introduced, primarily modelled after the Prussian model. In 1877, the nation's first university, the University of Tokyo was established by merging Edo-era institutions and schools, including the aforementioned Yushima Seidō. Hired foreign scholars, known as o-yatoi gaikokujin, were invited to teach at this newly founded university and military academies. These scholars were gradually replaced by Japanese scholars who had been educated at this university or abroad. In 1897, Kyoto Imperial University was established as the country's second university, which was followed by other imperial universities and private universities such as Keio and Waseda after the 1920s.

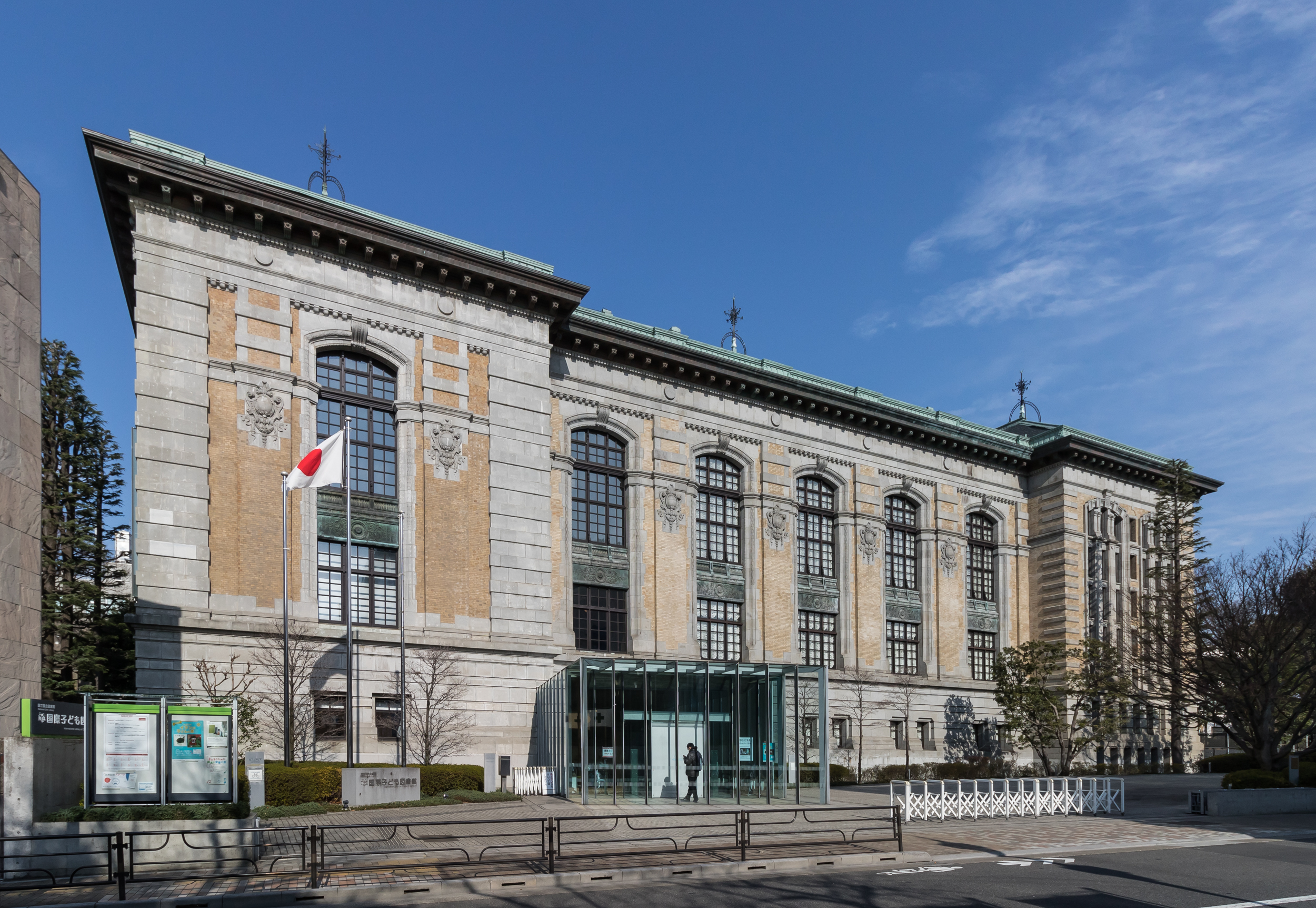
Former building of the Imperial Library, now used as the International Library of Children's Literature

In the 1890s, Japan saw a rise in reformers, child experts, magazine editors, and educated mothers who embraced new ideas about childhood and education. They introduced the upper middle class to a concept of childhood that involved children having their own space, reading children's books, playing with educational toys, and spending significant time on school homework. These concepts quickly spread across all social classes. The Meiji government established Japan's first modern public library in 1872, which is regarded as the origin of today's National Diet Library.

=== Post-WWII ===
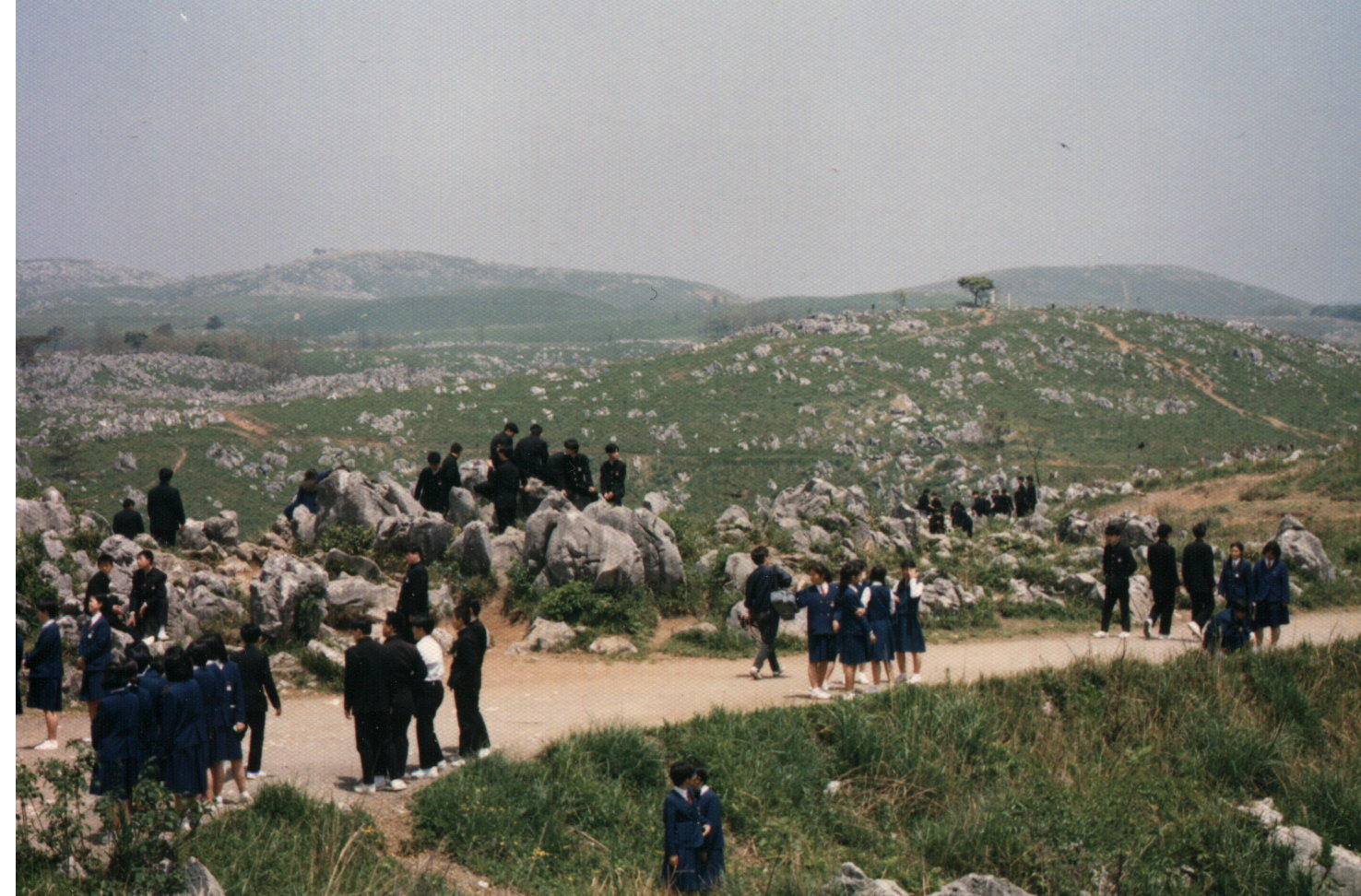
Secondary school students on a school excursion

After Japan’s defeat in the Second World War, the Allied occupation introduced educational reforms, officially to promote democracy and pacifism. The reforms aimed to decentralise education, reduce state control, weaken the class structure and encourage teacher initiative. The Fundamental Law of Education and the School Education Law, both enacted in 1947, laid the foundation for a new education system modelled after the American system, with six years of elementary school, three years of lower secondary school, three years of upper secondary school, and four years of university education. Compulsory education was extended to nine years, and coeducation became more common.

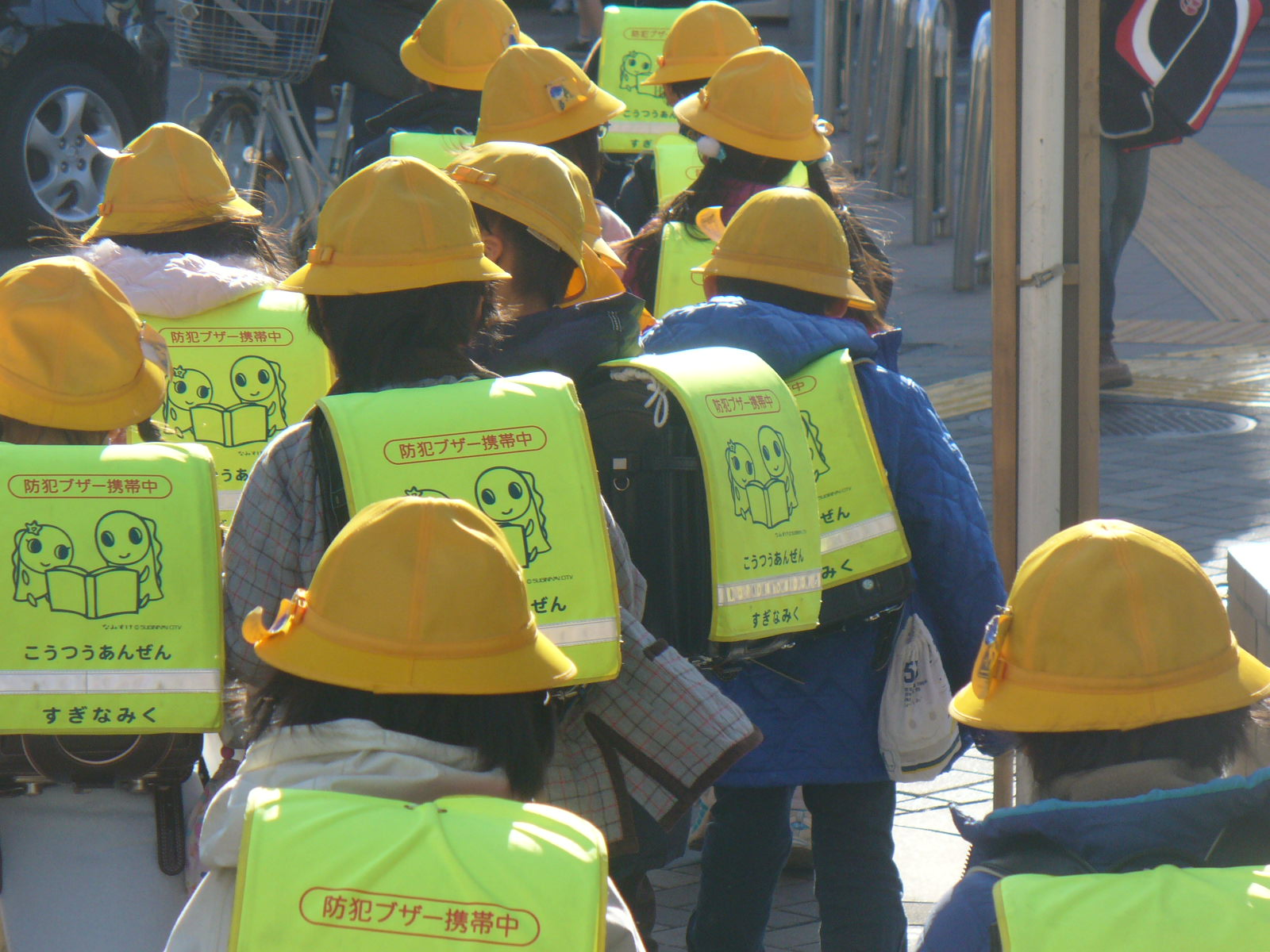
Primary school pupils on their way to school

After the occupation period ended in 1951, Japan's education system continued to evolve. The 1950s saw efforts to re-centralise some aspects of education, including curriculum and textbook standards, under the Ministry of Education. Moral education was reintroduced, and measures were taken to standardise teacher performance and administration. During the 1960s and 1970s, Japan experienced rapid economic growth and became the second largest economy in the world, which impacted its education system. The government invested heavily in education to support industrial development and technological advancement. This period saw a significant increase in the number of universities and vocational schools to meet the demands of a growing economy. University admissions became intensely selective and competitive during this period.

By the 1980s, Japan's education system faced new challenges. The pressure of entrance examinations and the intense competition for university places led to significant stress among students. In response, the government implemented several reforms aimed at reducing the academic burden and promoting a more holistic education (Yutori education). These included curriculum revisions, the introduction of more creative and critical thinking subjects, and a greater emphasis on moral and character education. This policy caused major concerns that academic skills for Japanese students may have declined from the mid-1990s, and after gradual changes, it was abolished completely by 2011. Japanese students showed a significant improvement in math and science scores in the 2011, compared to in 2007, according to the TIMSS survey.

== Organization of the school system ==
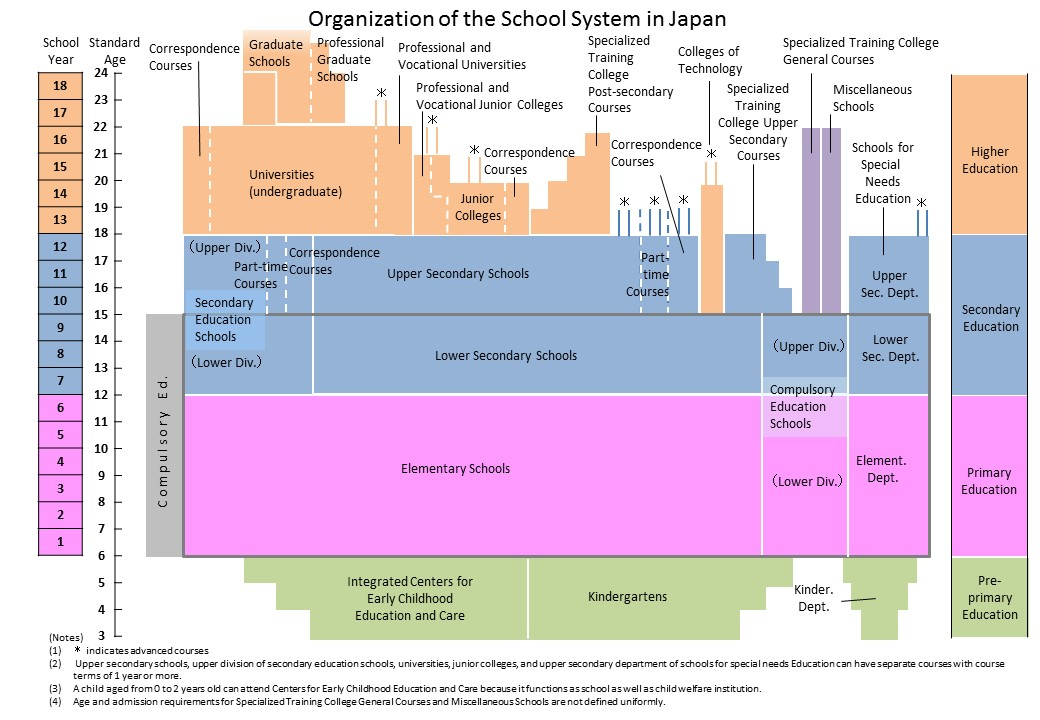

== School levels ==
The academic year in Japan begins in April. Classes are normally held from Monday to Friday. At the primary and secondary level, the school year consists of two or three terms, which are separated by short holidays in spring and winter, and a six-week-long summer break. Universities typically have two semesters, with the second starting from September or October, incorporating a new year break towards the end of the semester.

The year structure is summarized below:

Age	Year	Educational establishments					
6+	1	Elementary school (小学校 shōgakkō); Compulsory Education					Special school (特別支援学校 Tokubetsu-shien gakkō)
7+	2	Elementary school (小学校 shōgakkō); Compulsory Education					Special school (特別支援学校 Tokubetsu-shien gakkō)
8+	3	Elementary school (小学校 shōgakkō); Compulsory Education					Special school (特別支援学校 Tokubetsu-shien gakkō)
9+	4	Elementary school (小学校 shōgakkō); Compulsory Education					Special school (特別支援学校 Tokubetsu-shien gakkō)
10+	5	Elementary school (小学校 shōgakkō); Compulsory Education					Special school (特別支援学校 Tokubetsu-shien gakkō)
11+	6	Elementary school (小学校 shōgakkō); Compulsory Education					Special school (特別支援学校 Tokubetsu-shien gakkō)
12+	1 (7th)	Junior high school/Lower secondary school (中学校 chūgakkō); Compulsory Education					Special school (特別支援学校 Tokubetsu-shien gakkō)
13+	2 (8th)	Junior high school/Lower secondary school (中学校 chūgakkō); Compulsory Education					Special school (特別支援学校 Tokubetsu-shien gakkō)
14+	3 (9th)	Junior high school/Lower secondary school (中学校 chūgakkō); Compulsory Education					Special school (特別支援学校 Tokubetsu-shien gakkō)
15+	1 (10th)	Senior high school/Upper secondary school (高等学校 kōtōgakkō, abbr. 高校 kōkō)			The upper-secondary course of special training school	College of technology (高等専門学校 kōtō senmongakkō, abbr. 高専 kōsen)	Special school (特別支援学校 Tokubetsu-shien gakkō)
16+	2 (11th)	Senior high school/Upper secondary school (高等学校 kōtōgakkō, abbr. 高校 kōkō)			The upper-secondary course of special training school	College of technology (高等専門学校 kōtō senmongakkō, abbr. 高専 kōsen)	Special school (特別支援学校 Tokubetsu-shien gakkō)
17+	3 (12th)	Senior high school/Upper secondary school (高等学校 kōtōgakkō, abbr. 高校 kōkō)			The upper-secondary course of special training school	College of technology (高等専門学校 kōtō senmongakkō, abbr. 高専 kōsen)	Special school (特別支援学校 Tokubetsu-shien gakkō)
18+	Associate's./|\.Foundation's	University: Undergraduate (大学 daigaku; 学士課程 gakushi katei)	National Academy (大学校 daigakkō)	Medical School (医学部 Igaku-bu); Veterinary school (獣医学部 Jūigaku-bu); Dentistry School (歯学部 Shigaku-bu); Pharmaceutical School (薬学部 Yakugaku-bu); National Defense Medical College (防衛医科大学校, Bōei Ika Daigakkō)	Junior College (Note: There are also courses for three years.) (短期大学 Tanki-daigaku, abbr. 短大 tandai); Vocational School (Note: The educational term is mainly for two years but some have departments for one, three or four years.) (専門学校 Senmon-gakkō)	College of technology (高等専門学校 kōtō senmongakkō, abbr. 高専 kōsen)	Special school (特別支援学校 Tokubetsu-shien gakkō)
19+	Associate's./|\.Foundation's	University: Undergraduate (大学 daigaku; 学士課程 gakushi katei)	National Academy (大学校 daigakkō)	Medical School (医学部 Igaku-bu); Veterinary school (獣医学部 Jūigaku-bu); Dentistry School (歯学部 Shigaku-bu); Pharmaceutical School (薬学部 Yakugaku-bu); National Defense Medical College (防衛医科大学校, Bōei Ika Daigakkō)	Junior College (短期大学 Tanki-daigaku, abbr. 短大 tandai); Vocational School (専門学校 Senmon-gakkō)	College of technology (高等専門学校 kōtō senmongakkō, abbr. 高専 kōsen)	Special school (特別支援学校 Tokubetsu-shien gakkō)
20+	Bachelor's (学士 Gakushi)	University: Undergraduate (大学 daigaku; 学士課程 gakushi katei)	National Academy (大学校 daigakkō)	Medical School (医学部 Igaku-bu); Veterinary school (獣医学部 Jūigaku-bu); Dentistry School (歯学部 Shigaku-bu); Pharmaceutical School (薬学部 Yakugaku-bu); National Defense Medical College (防衛医科大学校, Bōei Ika Daigakkō)			
21+	Bachelor's (学士 Gakushi)	University: Undergraduate (大学 daigaku; 学士課程 gakushi katei)	National Academy (大学校 daigakkō)	Medical School (医学部 Igaku-bu); Veterinary school (獣医学部 Jūigaku-bu); Dentistry School (歯学部 Shigaku-bu); Pharmaceutical School (薬学部 Yakugaku-bu); National Defense Medical College (防衛医科大学校, Bōei Ika Daigakkō)			
22+	Master's (修士 Shūshi)	Graduate School: Master (大学院博士課程前期 Daigaku-in Hakushi Katei Zenki)	National Academy: Master (大学校修士課程 Daigakkō Shūshi katei)	Medical School (医学部 Igaku-bu); Veterinary school (獣医学部 Jūigaku-bu); Dentistry School (歯学部 Shigaku-bu); Pharmaceutical School (薬学部 Yakugaku-bu); National Defense Medical College (防衛医科大学校, Bōei Ika Daigakkō)			
23+	Master's (修士 Shūshi)	Graduate School: Master (大学院博士課程前期 Daigaku-in Hakushi Katei Zenki)	National Academy: Master (大学校修士課程 Daigakkō Shūshi katei)	Medical School (医学部 Igaku-bu); Veterinary school (獣医学部 Jūigaku-bu); Dentistry School (歯学部 Shigaku-bu); Pharmaceutical School (薬学部 Yakugaku-bu); National Defense Medical College (防衛医科大学校, Bōei Ika Daigakkō)			
24+	Ph.D. (博士 Hakushi)	Graduate School: Ph.D. (大学院博士課程後期 Daigaku-in Hakushi Katei Kōki)	National Defense Academy: Ph.D. (防衛大学校博士課程 Bōei Daigakkō Hakushi katei)	Medical School: Ph.D. (医学博士 Igaku Hakushi); Veterinary School: Ph.D. (獣医学博士 Jūigaku Hakushi); Dentistry School: Ph.D. (歯学博士 Shigaku Hakushi); Pharmaceutical School: Ph.D. (薬学博士 Yakugaku Hakushi)			
25+	Ph.D. (博士 Hakushi)	Graduate School: Ph.D. (大学院博士課程後期 Daigaku-in Hakushi Katei Kōki)	National Defense Academy: Ph.D. (防衛大学校博士課程 Bōei Daigakkō Hakushi katei)	Medical School: Ph.D. (医学博士 Igaku Hakushi); Veterinary School: Ph.D. (獣医学博士 Jūigaku Hakushi); Dentistry School: Ph.D. (歯学博士 Shigaku Hakushi); Pharmaceutical School: Ph.D. (薬学博士 Yakugaku Hakushi)			
26+	Ph.D. (博士 Hakushi)	Graduate School: Ph.D. (大学院博士課程後期 Daigaku-in Hakushi Katei Kōki)	National Defense Academy: Ph.D. (防衛大学校博士課程 Bōei Daigakkō Hakushi katei)	Medical School: Ph.D. (医学博士 Igaku Hakushi); Veterinary School: Ph.D. (獣医学博士 Jūigaku Hakushi); Dentistry School: Ph.D. (歯学博士 Shigaku Hakushi); Pharmaceutical School: Ph.D. (薬学博士 Yakugaku Hakushi)			

=== Secondary school ===
==== Lower secondary school ====
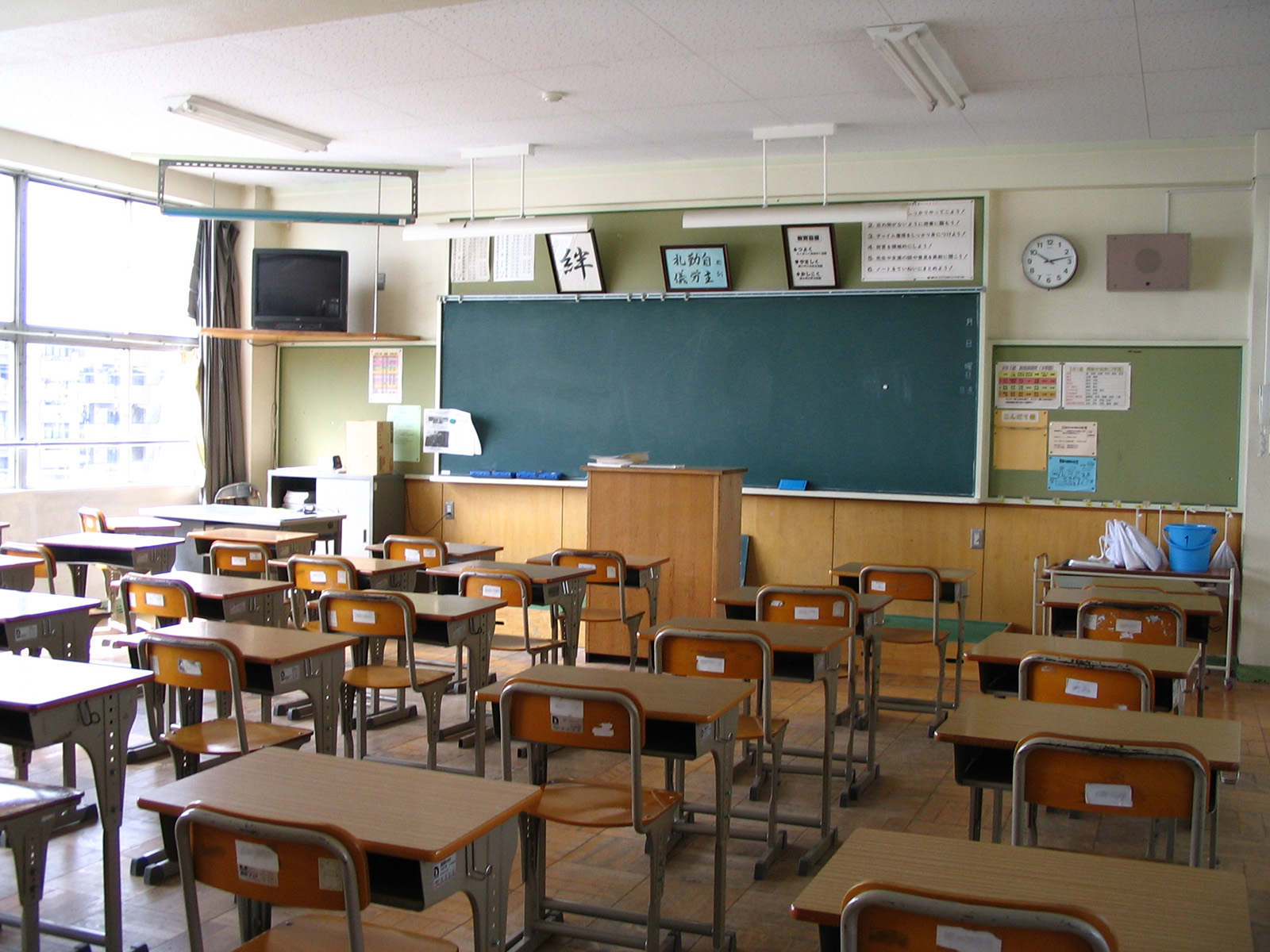
A typical classroom in a Japanese junior high school

The lower secondary school covers years seven through nine, with children typically aged twelve through fifteen. There are 3.2 million primary school students in Japan as of 2023, down from over 5.3 million in 1991. However, the number of junior high schools has remained relatively static, falling from 11,275 in 1993 to 9,944 in 2023. The number of junior high school teachers has also changed little, with 257,605 junior high school teachers in 1996, and 247,485 in 2023. Approximately 8% of junior high students attend private junior high schools (accounting for 7% of all junior high schools by number). Private schools are considerably more expensive: as of 2013, the average annual cost of private primary school attendance was ¥1,295,156 per student, roughly thrice the ¥450,340 cost for a public school. Japan's compulsory education ends at year nine, but less than 2% drop out; 60% of students advanced to senior education as of 1960, increasing rapidly to over 90% by 1980, rising further each year until reaching 98.3% as of 2012.

Instruction in primary schools is often in the form of lectures. Teachers also use other media, such as television and radio, and there is some laboratory work. By 1989 about 45% of all public primary schools had computers, including schools that used them only for administrative purposes. All course contents are specified in the Course of Study for Lower-Secondary Schools. Some subjects, such as Japanese language and mathematics, are coordinated with the elementary curriculum. Others, such as foreign-language study, begin at this level, though from April 2011, English became a compulsory part of the elementary school curriculum. The junior school curriculum covers Japanese language, social studies, mathematics, science, music, fine arts, health, and physical education. All students are also exposed to industrial arts and homemaking. Moral education and special activities continue to receive attention.

The ministry recognizes a need to improve the teaching of all foreign languages, especially English. To improve instruction in spoken English, the government invites many young native speakers of English to Japan to serve as assistants to school boards and prefectures under its Japan Exchange and Teaching Programme (JET). Beginning with 848 participants in 1987, the program grew to a high of 6,273 participants in 2002. Today, the program is again growing due to English becoming a compulsory part of the elementary school curriculum in 2011. As of July 2023, 5,831 language teachers are hired through the JET programme, most of them coming from the United States, the United Kingdom, Canada and Australia. The total number of foreign nationals hired as language teachers is 20,249 as of 2021.

==== Upper secondary school ====
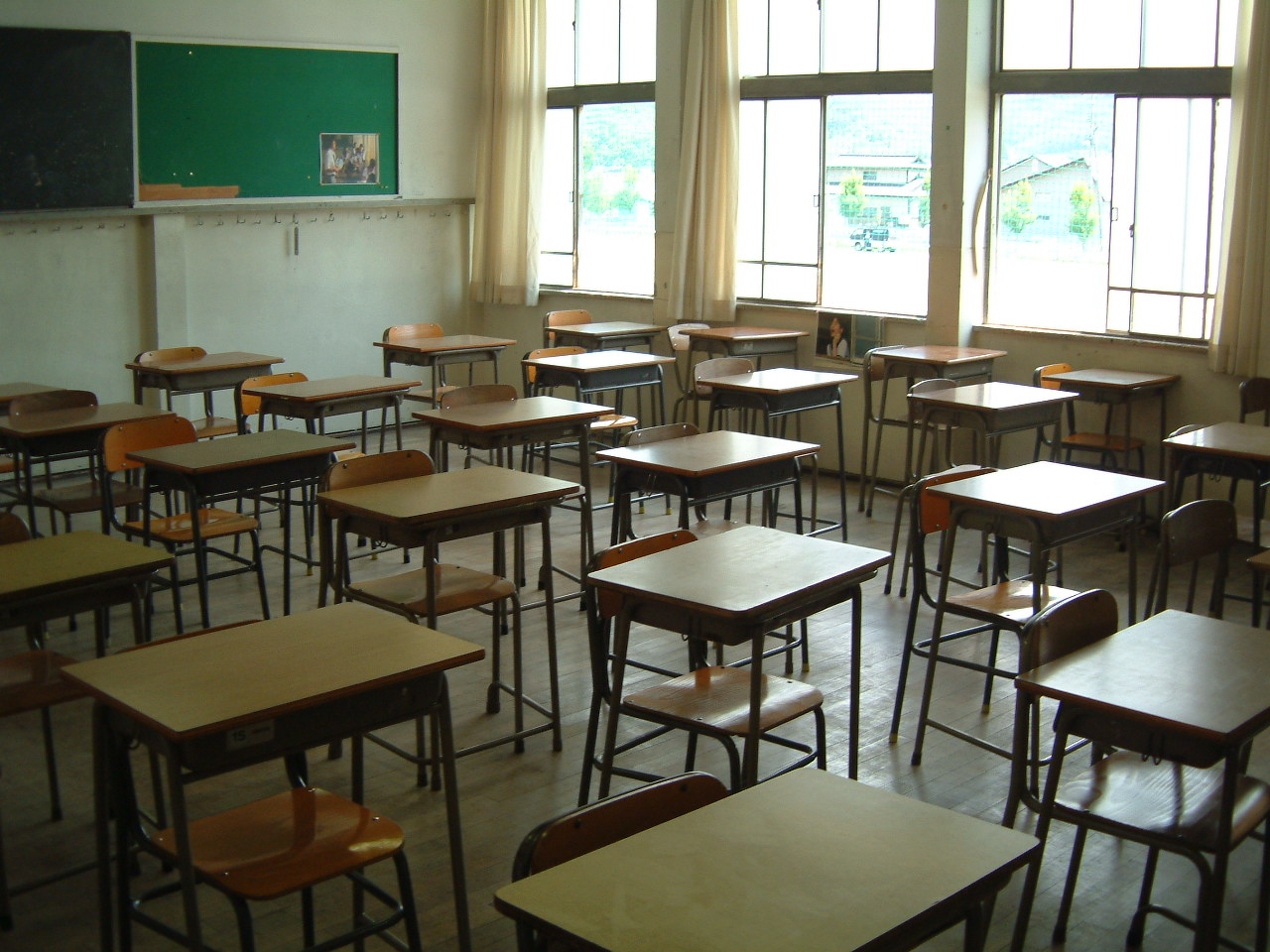
A typical Japanese high school classroom

Though upper-secondary school is not compulsory in Japan, 98.8% of all junior high school graduates enrolled as of 2020. Upper secondary consists of three years. Private upper-secondary schools account for about 55% of all upper-secondary schools. Beginning in 2010, public high schools do not collect tuition fees any more, while private and national high schools are free in certain prefectures including Tokyo.

The most common type of upper-secondary school has a full-time, general program that offers academic courses for students preparing for higher education as well as technical and vocational courses for students expecting to find employment after graduation. A small number of schools offer part-time programs, evening courses, or correspondence education.

The first-year programs for students in both academic and commercial courses are similar. They include basic academic courses, such as Japanese, English, mathematics, and science. In upper-secondary school, differences in ability are first publicly acknowledged, and course content and course selection are far more individualized in the second year. However, there is a core of academic material throughout all programs.

Training of disabled students, particularly at the upper-secondary level, emphasizes vocational education to enable students to be as independent as possible within society. Vocational training varies considerably depending on the student's disability, but the options are limited for some. The government is aware of the necessity of broadening the range of possibilities for these students. Advancement to higher education is also a goal of the government, and it struggles to have institutions of higher learning accept more students with disabilities.

=== Higher and tertiary education ===
Higher and tertiary education in Japan is provided in universities (daigaku), junior colleges (tanki daigaku), colleges of technology (koto senmon gakko), and special training colleges (senmon gakko). Of these four types of institutions, only universities and junior colleges are strictly considered as higher education.

As of 2017, more than 2.89 million students were enrolled in 780 universities. At the top of the higher education structure, these institutions provide a four-year training leading to a bachelor's degree, and some offer six-year programs leading to a professional degree. There are two types of public four-year universities: the 86 national universities (including the Open University of Japan) and the 95 local public universities, founded by prefectures and municipalities. The 597 remaining four-year colleges in 2010 were private. With a wealth of opportunities for students wishing to pursue tertiary education, the nation's prestigious schools are the most appealing for students seeking top employment prospects. The University of Tokyo and Kyoto University, the nation's oldest universities, are the most prestigious and selective. In terms of international recognition, there are 49 Japanese universities listed on the QS World University Rankings 2025, with the University of Tokyo ranked 32nd and Kyoto University 50th.

Most university and college students attend full-time day programs. In 1990 the most popular courses, enrolling almost 40% of all undergraduate students, were in the social sciences, including business, law, and accounting. Other popular fields were engineering (19%), the humanities (15%), and education (7%).

The average costs (tuition, fees, and living expenses) for a year of higher education in 1986 were ¥1.4 million. Some students work part-time or take out loans through the government-supported Japan Scholarship Association, local governments, non-profit corporations, and other institutions.

== School subjects at the secondary level ==
The following is the set of compulsory subjects currently taught in the Japanese education system from the primary to secondary levels:

- Japanese (the national language)
- Arithmetic, mathematics, etc.
- Science, technology, etc.
- Foreign languages: English (rarely: Korean, Spanish, Arabic, French, German, or Mandarin)
- Social studies (history, geography, and civics).
- Physical education (health, sports, etc.)
- Moral education (usually taught at the primary school level).
- Informatics, information technology, etc.
- Home economics, etc.

In Japanese elementary, junior, and senior secondary schools, textbooks that have passed the certification process from the Ministry of Education (MEXT) must be used.

== Academic grading ==
Japanese schools tend to follow different academic grading principles. Many universities use the following for assessment scores and marks:

Grade in Japanese (Kanji)	English translation	Corresponding percentage	4-scale university
shū (秀)	Exemplary, excellent	S (90–100%), rarely given
yū (優)	Very good	A (80–89%)	A (80–100%)
ryō (良)	Good	B (70–79%)	B (70–79%)
ka (可)	Average, passing	C (60–69%)	C (60–69%)
nin (認) (Note: Nin or gō (合) is sometimes used in the event of passing without grading, such as through credit transfer.)	Approved, acceptable	D/F (50–59%), uncommon	D/F (50–59%), uncommon
fuka (不可)	Unacceptable, failed	F (0–59% or 0–49%)	F (0–59% or 0–49%)

=== Primary school levels ===
Elementary school students (years 1 through 6) are expected to complete their compulsory primary school education (義務教育, gimu kyoiku) as well as pass the admissions examinations for junior high schools.

=== Secondary school levels ===
For students to enter the secondary school level, students are required to sit for and pass the admissions examinations set by the schools. Failure indicates that students cannot proceed to secondary school.

Secondary education in Japan is difficult because it rigorously prepares students for university entrance. Many parents often send children to private cram schools known as juku (塾) to help prepare them for university entrance examinations such as the National University Entrance Qualification Examination (大学入試共通テスト). Classes for juku are typically held in the evenings after students have completed their regular day courses.

Most secondary schools in Japan have a numerical grading system from 5 to 1, with 5 being the highest score.

=== Government intervention ===
Under the Basic Act on Education (2007) Japan has signed to provide equal opportunity in education including individuals with disabilities. Along with the Basic Act on Education, the Convention on the Rights of Persons with Disabilities (CRPD) was passed in 2006 and was ratified in 2014 as part of welfare. These two acts promised that the national and local governments would provide special needs education programs with adequate accommodation according to their level of disability. The purpose of the Special Needs Education is to help individuals develop their potential under their capabilities to gain independence and to gain vocational training in special fields. Some schools accommodate students with a disability under traditional school settings, but in certain cases, students are placed in independent schools specialized in the special needs education program. This program supports students with visual impairment, hearing impairment, physical disability, emotional behavioral disorder, learning disabilities, speech-language impairment (communication disorder), health impairment and development delay.

=== Reforms ===
Children with disabilities, along with their parents, did not have a voice until the 1990s when special needs education started to receive public attention. Before then, children with disabilities were deemed "slow learners" or "difficult to blend in". The education department of the Japanese government slowly started to focus on giving equal rights to children with disabilities, and the first major reform began as an introduction of a "Resource Room System", which served as a supplemental special need program for students with disabilities attending traditional school settings. In 2006, a greater educational reform took place to promote the notion of "inclusive education". This inclusive education program came into being due to the influence of three political factors: the international movement for school inclusion, the reform of welfare for people with disabilities, and a general reform of the education system in Japan. The purpose of this act was to avoid isolation of students with disabilities with the rest of the mainstream society and integrate special need education with traditional education system by providing a more universal and diverse classroom setting. In recent years, the Japanese government continues to pass equal rights to children with disabilities under special need education and inclusive education as public welfare.

== Extracurricular activities ==
The Japanese educational system is supplemented by a heavy emphasis on extracurricular activities, also known as shadow education, which are any educational activities that do not take place during formal schooling. This is largely motivated by the extreme weight that is placed upon formal examinations as a prerequisite to attend university, something that is seen as integral to their future career and social status to gain a competitive edge, Japanese families are willing to expend money and have their child put in time and effort into a supplementary education. Forms of shadow education include mogi shiken, which are practice exams given by private companies that determine the child's chances of getting into a university. Juku are private after-school classes that aim to develop abilities for students to excel in formal school curricula or to prepare for university examinations. Ronin are students who undergo full-time preparation for university exams following high school due to their inability to get into their school of choice.

Over 86% of students with college plans participate in at least one form of shadow education, with 60% participating in two or more.

== Criticisms ==
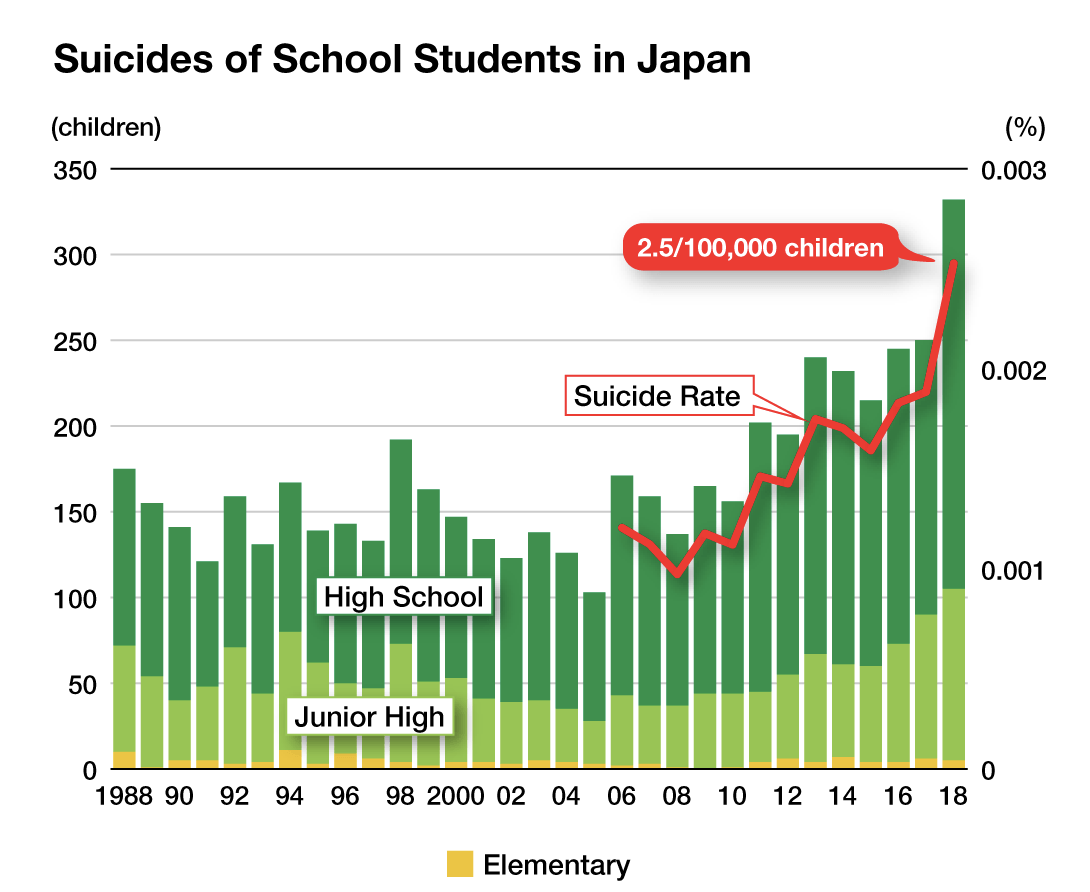
Suicide rate of Japanese students between 1988 and 2018.

Japanese students are faced with immense pressure to succeed academically from their parents, teachers, peers, and society. This is largely a result of a society that has long placed a great amount of importance on education, and a system that places all of its weight upon a single examination that has significant life-long consequences. This pressure has led to behaviors such as school violence, cheating, suicide, and significant psychological harm. In some cases, students have experienced nervous breakdowns that have required hospitalization as young as twelve. In 1991, it was reported that 1,333 people in the age group of 15–24 had killed themselves, much of which was due to academic pressure. In an international perspective, teenage suicide rates are close to the OECD average and below those of the United States. A survey by the Education Ministry showed that students at public schools were involved in a record number of violent incidents in 2007: 52,756 cases, an increase of some 8,000 on the previous year. In almost 7,000 of these incidents, teachers were the victims of assault.

The Japanese educational system has also been criticized for failure to foster independent thinkers with cultural and artistic sensibility. Japanese students who attend schools overseas often face difficulty adapting and competing in that environment due to a lack of international viewpoints.

There is also criticism about the amount of free time students are given and/or are allowed within their middle school and high school careers. As Japanese students grow, their time to assert what they have learned in class to real life is cut dramatically, starting with the elevation from elementary to lower secondary school. A large part of this has to do with cram schooling, or Juku, which can start as early as elementary and takes full effect toward the end of junior high school, with roughly 60% of all students participating. This number has increased drastically over the past couple decades, as well as the view of juku within the Japanese academic system. While initially seen as a problem, cram schools have become synonymous with Japan's schooling and are even seen as a support to the structure of said schooling. With juku costing between JP¥600,000-¥1.5 million, depending on how old the student is and how much the guardian can pay, cram school is a very profitable part of the economy, with over 48,000 juku schools active today. With these extra school sessions ranging between 1 and 6 days a week on top of normal classes, there is a fear that students will be unable to incorporate what they have learned into their lives, and thus could foreseeably lose the retained knowledge once the Entrance Exams are over. According to data from OECD's PISA 2015, after-school study time was the 4th lowest among 55 surveyed countries, behind Germany, Finland, and Switzerland.

=== School textbooks ===
School textbooks tend to minimize or obscure the war crimes committed by the Imperial Japanese Army during World War II, including the Nanjing Massacre, human experimentation by Unit 731, “comfort women” forced into prostitution for Japanese soldiers, and the military's involvement with the civilian population of Okinawa prior to the end of the war.

=== Bullying ===
There is criticism about insufficient efforts to reduce bullying in schools. In fiscal 2019, there were a record 612,496 bullying cases in schools across Japan. This includes public and, private elementary, junior high, high school, ls, and special schools for children with disabilities. Serious incidents with severe physical or psychological damage were 723 (a 20% increase from 2018). Bullying happens mostly in elementary schools (484,545 cases in 2019) followed by junior high schools (106,524 cases in 2019) and high schools (18,352 cases in 2019). In fiscal 2019, 317 students died from suicide of which 10 suffered from bullying. 61.9% of cases were verbal bullying and online bullying accounted for 18.9% in high schools. In 2019 there were 78,787 cases of violent acts by students in elementary, junior high, and high schools. Separate data from TIMSS 2019 and PISA 2018 indicate a lower than average incidence of bullying in international comparisons.

== International education ==
International schools in Japan are schools where all classes are generally taught in English. Many international schools are classified as kakushu gakko ("miscellaneous schools") under Article 134 of the School Education Act, rather than an officially accredited ichijoko. This means attendance to these schools does not fulfill Japan's compulsory education.

As of 2016, Japan has 30 to 40 international schools.

== See also ==
- CoNETS
- Curriculum guideline (Japan)
- Eikaiwa school
- Japanese history textbook controversies
- Japanese graduation ceremony
- Japanese school uniform
- Language minority students in Japanese classrooms
- Yutori education

=== By city ===
- Education in Tokyo
- Education in Kobe
