= Nishi High School =

High school in Tokyo, Japan

Coordinates: 35°41′30.9″N 139°36′17″E

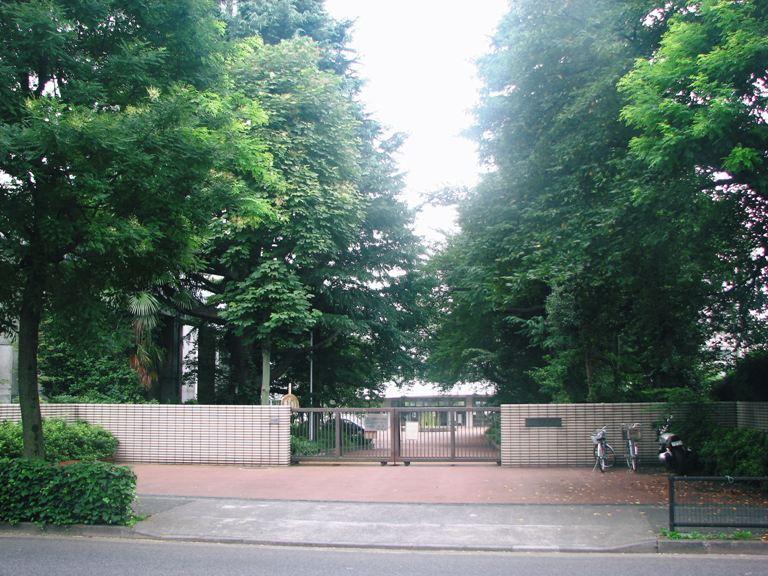
The Entrance to Nishi High School, Tokyo

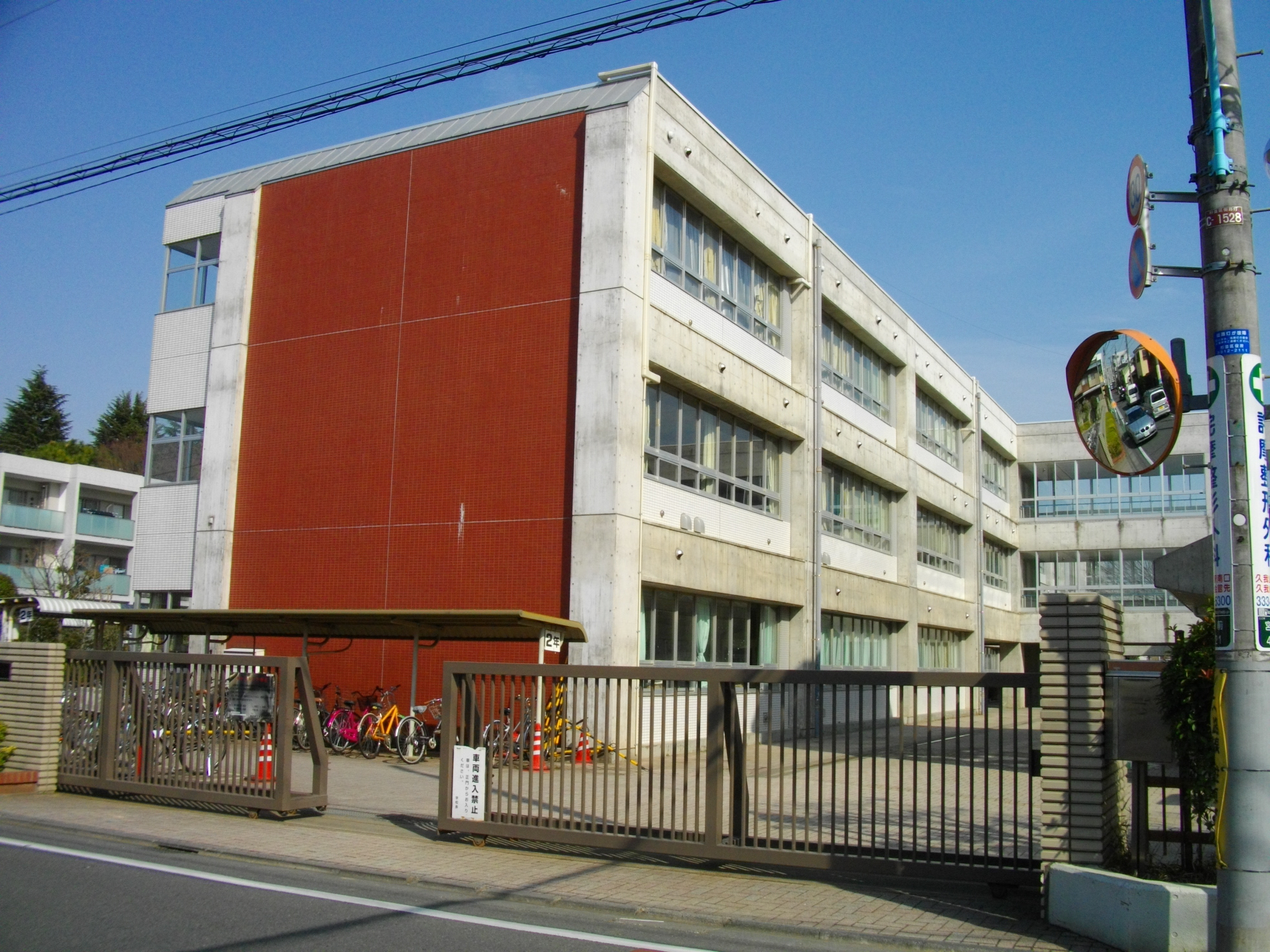
One of the school buildings of Nishi High School

Tokyo Metropolitan Nishi High School (東京都立西高等学校, Tōkyō Toritsu Nishi Kōtōgakkō) is a Japanese high school, founded in 1937 in Aoyama, Minato-ku, as the Tokyo Tenth Middle School (or Tokyo Tenth Junior High School (東京府立第十中学校, Tōkyō Furitsu Jū Chūgakkō)), which moved to Miyamae, Suginami-ku in 1939, and changed its name in 1950 to Nishi High School, with "Nishi" meaning "West". It was well known in the 1950s and 1960s for the large proportion of graduates who gained admission to the prestigious national universities, such as the University of Tokyo, Hitotsubashi University and the Tokyo Institute of Technology, though it suffered a decline later.

As Nishi High School in 2001 was designated as one of the four high schools for the Tokyo Government's emphasis for continued education to college (進学指導重点校), it was once again being referred to as one of the best public high schools in Japan.

The students' active extracurricular activities include: tennis, basketball, handball, American football, brass band and others.

Nishi High School is located within ten minutes' walk from Kugayama Station of Keio Inokashira Line railway, and 20 minutes' walk from Nishi-Ogikubo Station of JR Chūō Main Line railway.

== See also ==
- Education in Tokyo
  - List of high schools in Tokyo
- Hibiya High School
- List of Nishi High School's Prominent Teachers & Alumni (東京都立西高等学校の人物一覧)
