= Yutori education =

Japanese education policy

Yutori education (ゆとり教育, yutori-kyōiku) is a Japanese education policy which reduces the hours and the content of the curriculum in primary education. In 2016, the mass media in Japan used this phrase to criticize drops in scholastic ability.

== Background ==
In Japan, primary education is prescribed by Japanese curriculum guidelines (学習指導要領 gakushū shidō yōryō). Since the 1970s, the Japanese government has gradually reduced the amount of class time and the contents given in the guideline, and this tendency is called yutori education. However, in recent years, notably after the 2011 earthquake, this has been a controversial issue. A 2024 study by Bai and Tanaka reported that individuals who experienced more years under the relaxed education system had lower earnings, and were less likely to hold full-time or skilled employment in adulthood.

Yutori education may be translated as "relaxed education" or "education free from pressure", stemming from the word ゆとり, yutori, 'leeway'.

== History ==
In the 1970s, school violence and the collapse of classroom discipline became a major problem in junior high schools. So, the government revised the teaching guidelines in 1977. The main purpose was to reduce education stress and to introduce relaxed classes called Rest Periods (ゆとりの時間, Yutori no jikan).

In 1984, during the time of Prime Minister Yasuhiro Nakasone, the Special Council for Education (臨時教育審議会, Rinji Kyōiku Shingikai) was established as a consultative body. The council recommended that education regard the individual personalities of each student as paramount. Two major revisions of the teaching guidelines in 1989 and 1998 were implemented following this announcement.

In 1987, the School Curriculum Council (教育課程審議会, Kyōiku Katei Shingikai) declared four basic core principles to improve education in kindergartens, elementary schools, and junior and senior high schools.

1. To form people with strength, confidence, and open minds.
2. To create self-motivated students able to deal with changes in society.
3. To teach the fundamental knowledge needed by Japanese people and to enrich education to ensure it considers individuality as very important.
4. To form people who fully understand international society while still respecting Japanese culture and traditions.

Under these principles, the teaching guidelines were revised in 1989. In the lower grades of elementary schools, science and social studies classes were abolished and "environmental studies" was introduced. In junior high school, the number of elective classes was increased to further motivate students.

From 1992, schools closed on the second Saturday of every month to increase student spare time in accordance with the teaching guidelines. From 1995, schools closed on the fourth Saturday also.

In 1996, when the 15th Central Council for Education (中央教育審議会, Chūō Kyōiku Shingikai) was asked about what the Japanese education of the 21st century should be like, it submitted a report suggesting "the ability to survive" should be the basic principle of education. "The ability to survive" is defined as a principle that tries to keep the balance of intellectual, moral, and physical education.

In 1998, the teaching guidelines were revised to reflect the council's report. 30% of the curriculum was cut and "time for integrated study" in elementary and junior high school was established.

The School Curriculum Council stated its goals in a report.

1. To enrich humanity, sociability, and the awareness of living as a Japanese within international society.
2. To develop the ability to think and learn independently.
3. To inculcate fundamental concepts in children at an appropriate pace while developing their individuality.
4. To let every school form its own ethos.

Around 1999, a decline in the academic abilities of university students became a serious concern. Elementary and secondary education started to be reconsidered. This trend focused criticism on the new teaching guidelines and aroused controversy.

In 2002, schools were no longer compulsory on Saturdays.

In 2007, a National Assessment of Academic Ability (全国学力・学習状況調査, Zenkoku Shōchūgakusei Gakuryoku Test) was created.

== See also ==
- Education in Japan
- History of education in Japan
- Juku
- Ministry of Education, Culture, Sports, Science and Technology (Japan)
- Pi is 3
