= Pi is 3 =

Misunderstanding in Japanese education

"Pi is 3" is a misconception that the Japanese public once believed that, due to the revision of the Japanese Curriculum guideline in 2002, the approximate value of pi (π), which had previously been taught as 3.14, is now taught as 3 in arithmetic education. In fact, this is not true, and even after the revision, the approximate value of pi is still taught as 3.14.

In the Japanese Curriculum guideline published in December 1998 and implemented in 2002, regulations such as the limitation on the number of digits for decimal multiplication were changed. Although the new regulations did not change the fact that pi was to be calculated using "3.14," they added the statement that "3 is used for the purpose."

At that time, many people believed elementary school students were forced to hand calculate pi as "3", and believed that is a typical example of the negative effects of a relaxed education. This misunderstanding was not easily resolved.

== Origin ==
In the fall of 1999, a major cram school company launched a major campaign with advertisements that read "The formula for finding the area of a circle: radius x radius x 3!", "Calculate the quadrature of a circle with pi as approximately 3 instead of 3.14."

The mass media also picked up on this issue, and it wrongly became widely believed in society that "as a result of the relaxed education system, pi is now taught as 3".

As a criticism of the decline in scholastic achievement and the relaxed education system, "Pi is 3" was widely covered in weekly and monthly magazines and other mathematics-related journals.

== Details ==
=== "Use 3 if fits your purpose" guideline ===
The Japanese Curriculum guideline was started as a guide only, but at some point, they came to be considered legally binding. In addition to this, there was also a so-called "restrictive provision" that "has to teach without excesses or deficiencies of what the guidelines say." This statement was carried over to the 1998 revision (implemented in 2002 for elementary schools.)

(1) c) of "section B: Quantity and Measurement" and (1) d) of "section C: Figures"in the contents, while 3.14 is used for pi, consideration should be given to the ability to process using 3 for the purposes. — Curriculum guideline published in 1989

"To process using 3 for the purpose" assumed for,

- If you want to make an estimate, calculate quickly by 3.
- The decimal point is not calculated from the beginning, and a rough guess is made with 3 to reduce the possibility of calculation errors.
- When want to approximate the perimeter or area of an object that is similar to a circle, calculate the circumference and area of the circle using pi as 3.

One interpretation is that they expect to develop the ability to make appropriate judgments and process the information according to the situation and application.

=== Issues with the 1998 Revised Guidelines ===
As part of the so-called "relaxed education," the content of arithmetic learning in multiplication, division, and decimals was reduced, while calculators were allowed to be used from the arithmetic learning stage.

On the other hand, because relaxed education reduced the time for learning but not the areas of learning, many people believed that, students were forced by guideline to use 3 instead of 3.14 as the approximate number of Pi for calculating. However, it was a misunderstanding.

In addition, the use of calculators, which was allowed from the 5th grade under the previous teaching guidelines, was allowed from the 4th grade and calculations using 3.14 were possible even with a calculator.

=== Limit the number of decimal digits ===
In the 1998 Revised Curriculum guideline in Japan, the calculation of decimals in the fifth grade of elementary school is as follows,

2. Details

A. Numbers and Calculations.

(3) Understand the meaning of multiplication and division of decimals and be able to use them appropriately.

(3c) The student should be able to think about how to multiply and divide decimals and be able to perform those calculations. Also, to understand the magnitude of the remainder.

(note 3c) The calculation of decimals to the nearest 1/10th of a place shall be handled.

Because of the above limitation, this led to the misunderstanding that 3 must be used as pi. But even if decimals were limited to 1/10th of a place, the pi used would still be 3.1, which does not define pi as 3.

=== The misunderstanding that "pi is approximately 3" ===
At that time, in the fall of 1999, a major cram school company released the following advertisement.

The formula for finding the area of a circle is radius x radius x 3? In 2002, fifth-grade students will be doing a quadrature calculation of circles with pi as "approximately 3" instead of 3.14. It's real.

They conducted a major campaign in the Tokyo metropolitan area, and the media covered it extensively.

This led to widespread public awareness of the misunderstanding that pi is now taught as 3 because of the relaxed education system.

Akito Arima, who promoted "relaxed education" as the Minister of Education at the time, repeatedly said, "I was stunned by that," and regretted "my failure to go around the country and explain it in detail."

=== Disappearance of the sentence ===
In the second report of the Japanese Central Council for Education on February 23, 2003, the policy of emphasizing scholastic ability was formulated.

In December 2003, the Curriculum guideline was partially revised to remove the limitation that they must be taught without excesses or deficiencies and changed to a minimum standard that allows teaching in more detail than what is written in the Curriculum guideline, if necessary.

On February 15, 2008, the Japanese Ministry of Education released the new Curriculum guideline (effective in 2011 for elementary schools), the first after the complete revision of the Fundamental Law of Education, and the restrictive provision was eliminated.

As a result of the increase in the content of the study, the content has become such that have already learned how to calculate the decimal point by the time they use pi, and the section on pi now states only that "pi shall be 3.14" and the statement "3 is used for the purpose" has been deleted.

== Impact ==
=== Science and education professionals ===
The issue of "pi is 3" was discussed in mathematics-related journals and various academic journals. This misunderstanding was not easily resolved, and there were many misunderstandings even among those involved in education.

In response to this situation, Masahiro Kaminaga, an associate professor of the Department of Electrical and Computer Engineering in Tohoku Gakuin University, confessed that he had been convinced that "relaxed education is a foolish reform that teaches pi as 3." And he said, "I usually said, 'Go and do your own research until you are satisfied,' but if teachers are like this, it must be a problem before educational reform."

Other issues with treating pi as approximately 3 that were discussed, included "pi is an irrational number, so it is neither exactly 3 nor 3.14. Thus, while the former and the latter are essentially equivalent in learning the procedure, there is a clear difference in approximate accuracy," "if pi is calculated as 3, the perimeter is the same for the circle and the regular hexagon inscribed in it," and "for the circumference of a circle with a diameter of 10 cm, the error would be 1.4 cm" were point out.

It also points out the danger of adding ".14" in vain in terms of significant figures.

=== The public ===
The misunderstanding that "they teach pi as 3 in elementary school" was seen in weekly and monthly magazines as well. This has resulted in a distrust of public school education.

In Nisio Isin's novel Zaregoto, a scene appeared in which the truncated decimal point is introduced as "the tragedy of 0.14".

On one TV program, five comedians presented a skit in which they used "Pi is OK at 3" as a key line.

The theme song of "Yutori-chan," an animation about Japan's "Yutori" generation, includes the lyrics "3.1415 pi is approximately 3."

The misunderstanding of teaching pi as 3 was also introduced by Akira Ikegami in a 2013 TV program.

=== University entrance examination questions ===
In 2003, in the sixth question of the first semester of science at the University of Tokyo, a question asking "Prove that pi is greater than 3.05" was included and it became famous as a question with a message opposing the government's stance of teaching pi as 3.

Example of a solution

To solve this problem, to prove that the perimeter of the regular dodecagon inscribed in the circle of diameter 1 is greater than 3.05.

First, consider a circle C of diameter 1 and a regular dodecagon inscribed in circle C. Since the length of the circumference of a circle of radius r is 2πr, the length of the circumference l of circle C whose radius 1/2 is

$$l=2\pi \cdot \frac{1}{2}=\pi$$.

Also, if the perimeter of the regular dodecagon inscribed in circle C is defined as L,

$$L=12 \sin 15^{\circ} =12\sqrt{\frac{1- \cos {30^{\circ}} }{2}}=6\sqrt{2-\sqrt{3}}$$
$$L^2=36\left(2-\sqrt{3}\right)>36(2-1.74)=9.36>9.3025=3.05^2$$.

Thus, the circumference L of a regular dodecagon are greater than 3.05. Then

$$\pi=l >L>3.05$$
$$\pi>3.05$$.

== See also ==
- Indiana pi bill
- Yutori education
- Curriculum guideline (Japan)
- Approximations of π
