= Hibiya High School =

Coordinates: 35.71529°N 139.75227°E

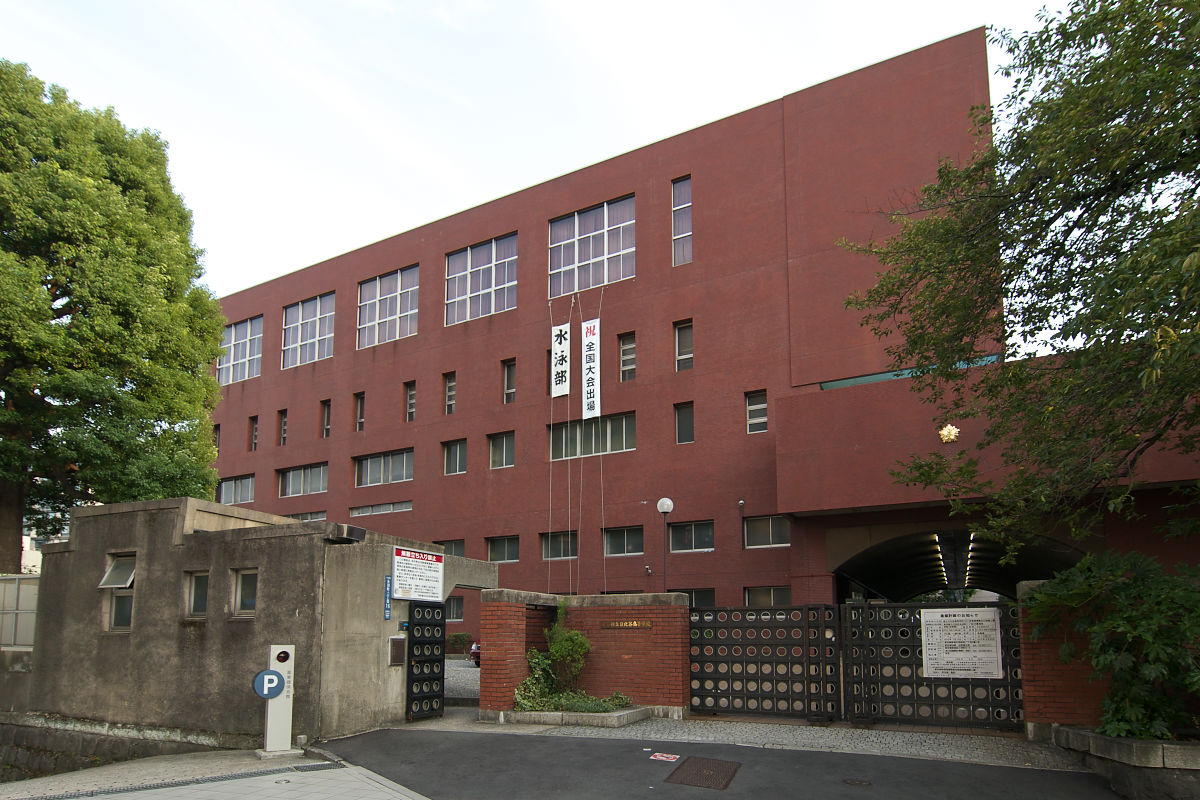
- Nagata-chō, Chiyoda, Tokyo; Japan

Information
- Type: Public
- Established: 1878
- School district: Tokyo Metropolitan Government Board of Education
- Principal: Naoomi Nagasawa (長澤直臣, Nagasawa Naoomi)
- Executive headteacher: Ryūji Nakano (中野隆司, Nakano Ryūji)
- Website: https://hibiya-h.metro.ed.jp/

Tokyo Metropolitan Hibiya High School (東京都立日比谷高等学校, Tōkyō Toritsu Hibiya Kōtōgakkō) is a public high school located in Nagata-chō, Chiyoda, Tokyo, Japan. It was founded in 1878 as the Tokyo First Middle School or Tokyo First Junior High School (東京府立第一中学校, Tōkyō Furitsu Daiichi Chūgakkō). It was well known in the 1950s and 1960s for the large proportion of graduates who gained admission to the University of Tokyo; though it suffered a decline in the 1970s, as of 2005 it was once again being referred to as the "best public high school in Japan".

== History ==
Tokyo First Middle School was established on 26 September 1878 in Tokyo's Hongō-ku; soon after, it moved to Kanda-ku, and moved several more times in the next two decades. Its establishment was the result of the Meiji Restoration drive to modernise the model of education in order to catch up with Western Europe and the United States. The Meiji era government and Tokyo Imperial University requested the thickened as a part route to Tokyo Imperial University though Tokyo First did not lay weight at first on the side of going on to school.

The school came to attract students not just from within Japan, but overseas as well; in 1904, out of 50 students granted scholarships by Korea's Joseon dynasty for overseas study, 44 of them enrolled at Tokyo First Middle School. However, they were all expelled due to a protest they organised in 1905 over the signing of the Japan–Korea Treaty of 1905, which effectively made the Korean Empire a protectorate of the Empire of Japan. Later, they were permitted to re-enroll the following year.

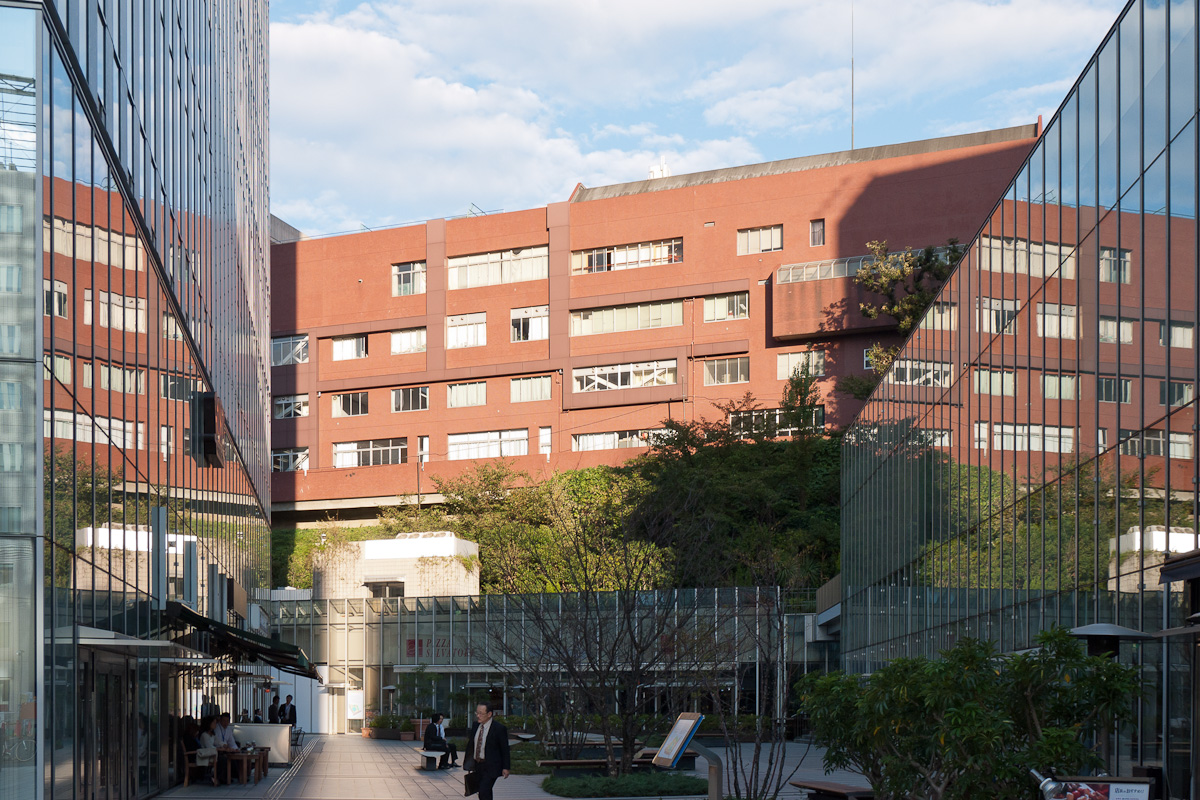
Hibiya High School as seen from the Prudential Tower.

By 1918, only four decades after its foundation, Tokyo First had already become the first step on the "escalator course" which students expected would lead them to Tokyo Imperial University. After World War II, Tokyo First Middle School went through a number of changes; it officially changed its name to Hibiya High School on 26 January 1950, and began admitting female students in April of the same year. Its first coeducational class enrolled 300 boys and 100 girls.

Though Tokyo First's track record for getting its students into higher schools and universities in the pre-war period was beneath that of other elite middle schools (specifically Fourth Tokyo Middle School), between 1953 and 1967, Hibiya High School consistently ranked first in the number of graduates entering the top-ranked University of Tokyo, and due to its reputation for excellence, and enrollment of students through a competitive entrance examination process from as far away as Kyūshū. In common with the rest of the Tokyo public school system, its prestige declined during the early 1970s. Until 1976, at least 20 graduates were admitted to the University of Tokyo each year, down from the peak of 193 graduates in 1964, but according to one account, the school had "dropped out of the spotlight altogether". In 1993, a single student from Hibiya High School gained admission to the University of Tokyo. However, under the leadership of the new principal Nagasawa, appointed in 2001, the school underwent a "renaissance". In 2006, 12 students gained admission to the University of Tokyo, and two years later, that figure more than doubled to 28.

The current number of students in Hibiya High school is around 1600.

== Exchange programs ==
Hibiya High school is also known for its international exchange programs with students spending from two weeks to a full academic year studying overseas. As a public high school Hibiya High School also continues to enroll students from a wide variety of backgrounds including native level Japanese speaking students of Chinese, Indonesian, Australian, Korean, European and North American heritage.

== See also ==
- List of high schools in Tokyo
- Nishi High School
