= Academic graduation by country =

End of academic ceremony in different countries

The procedures and traditions surrounding academic graduation ceremonies differ around the world.

== India ==
In India the graduation ceremony is commonly known as convocation. At the universities and institutes, the graduation ceremonies are formal affairs, which include an academic procession by both the academic heads and the students. The students usually get dressed up in a formal attire, wear a form of academic dress - usually a gown that is worn open in the front, sometimes accompanied by a square hat. They will have a procession of the academic staff and graduands, a valediction and then they are handed the certificates by the chief guest.

== Japan ==
=== Elementary and secondary schools ===
Underclassmen, parents, and teachers are seated first. The vice principal leads in the local officials and special guests. The teachers all stand and bow to them as they enter. When the graduates enter, they are led by their homeroom teachers. Everyone walks very slow and deliberate. They walk in straight lines and make 90 degree turns if turning is necessary. The students line up next to their chairs and wait for the home room teacher to signal and they all sit at once. The homeroom teacher then joins the rest of the teachers. The head of ceremonies asks everyone to stand and bow towards the Japanese flag. This is coordinated by playing three chords on the piano. 1st-prepare, 2nd-bow, 3rd-return upright.

Singing has a large part in the Japanese schools curriculum and is also a big part of graduation. The first song is Japan's national anthem, followed by the city song and the school song. The latter two are usually printed in the program. This is the last time the graduating class will sing the school song together with the rest of the school. At this point, or after diplomas, the lower class sings to the graduating class, and the graduating class to the lower class. Then everyone sings together. Some of the possible songs are: Tabidachi no Hi ni ja:旅立ちの日に, Sayonara, Until the World is One by Ya-Ya-Yah, Sakura by Naotaro Moriyama ja:さくら (森山直太朗の曲), Aogeba Tōtoshi and Hotaru no Hikari (sung to the tune of Auld Lang Syne).

After singing has finished, the principal wearing a Japanese style tuxedo or black tie goes to the podium. Usually a female teacher wearing a hakama brings out diplomas on a large tray. The homeroom teacher for each class calls out the names of his or her students in gender-split alphabetical order. Recently some schools have discontinued splitting the class by gender. Students stand and say "はい" (hai), Japanese for "yes". Large classes may only have their names called. Smaller classes might have each student go to the stage and receive their diploma. They queue up, walking in straight lines, 90 degree turns, at a deliberately slow pace. At some elementary schools the students give a short speech about what they want to do at Junior High before receiving their diplomas.

The principal reads the diploma out loud once to the first student in each class. The diploma is handed over full size in an open cover (not rolled-up). The principal rotates the diploma to face the student and hands it to them. The student receives the diploma by using their left hand first, and then their right hand before pulling it towards them. The student steps back and exchanges bows with the principal. The student then slowly closes the diploma and folds it under their left hand before turning and walking away. Returning to their seats, students stop and bow to the special guests.

After all the students are seated again, the principal makes a speech. The speeches are written vertically from top to bottom, right to left on a fan folded piece of paper. The principal's speech is followed by the head of the PTA. At junior high school an underclassmen may give a speech thanking the graduating students for things like being good senpai. And this is followed by a student speech from the student president. Students may give set group speeches, as if a dialogue between the lower class and upper class. Students take turns yelling out parts of the dialogue sometimes being accompanied by everyone or a few other students in unison. This might happen before, in-between and/or after the songs.

After ceremony students may get a final address by their homeroom teacher. A few moments later, the graduates are free to roam around the school, in and out of the teachers’ office. At Junior High school, students take everything with them on the last day and may do school cheers with the underclassman in front of the school. The school calendar does not end with graduation. The next business day after the ceremony 1st and 2nd year students continue classes until spring break officially starts.

== Philippines ==
Graduation is the award or acceptance of an academic degree or diploma. For Filipinos, the term “graduation” usually refers to the graduation ceremonies undergone by graduates who have finished a level of education. Some view a person as having truly graduated only if they have “marched” onstage to accept their diploma during the graduation ceremonies. Thus, graduation may be also considered a coming-of-age ritual for young Filipinos. Graduation ceremonies are held at the end of March or, in some cases, the beginning of April of every year.

Filipinos take part in a graduation ceremony every time they complete an educational level. These ceremonies are usually held for graduation from kindergarten, elementary school, high school, vocational school or college, and graduate school.

=== Attire ===
In past decades, elementary school and high school graduates usually wore white: white dresses for girls and white polo shirts and black pants for boys. The same went for kindergarten “graduates” except that girls usually wore identical dresses in a style and color agreed upon by the parents. Recent trends call for togas and mortarboards as standard graduation attire. The Department of Education (DepEd) also recently called for austerity measures, prohibiting extravagant spending and requiring students to wear only their school uniforms under their togas. All graduates usually wear corsages pinned on the left lapel or left breast of their clothing.

Graduates of vocational schools and colleges usually wear togas and mortarboards or caps. These are usually black, except for those colleges and universities that have togas made in the school colors. Underneath, the graduates wear formal clothes which may range from “Sunday best” to party attire. Those who finished post-graduate studies usually wear slightly different togas from those who finish undergraduate degrees. They also wear hoods banded with the color associated with their particular post-graduate course.

At the country’s national university, University of the Philippines (UP), the indigenous loose garment sablay is used as an academic costume since 2000 after it switched from the traditional cap and toga. It is traditionally worn over an ecru barong Tagalog and black pants for males, and a white or ecru dress for females. Sablay is worn by candidates for graduation at the right shoulder, and is then moved to the left shoulder after the President of the university confers their degree.

In 2020, DepEd proposed the use of sablay instead of cap and toga in the elementary and secondary graduation rites, akin to the official academic costume of UP, citing that the use of toga has “deep Western roots.”

=== Baccalaureate Mass ===
High school graduation ceremonies usually have a baccalaureate mass before the actual graduation ceremonies begin. This is especially true if the school is Catholic. Elementary school and college/post-graduate school graduations may or may not have baccalaureate masses.

Universities and colleges usually celebrate the baccalaureate mass and baccalaureate ceremonies on a separate day, usually the day before the graduation ceremonies. This is especially true if the school is Catholic. On this day, the awards for extra-curricular and co-curricular activities are given out, leaving only the major academic awards to be given on the graduation day itself.

=== Awards ===
The giving of awards for extra-curricular, co-curricular, and academic activities varies from school to school. Schools may give out all the awards on graduation day itself or may do so on a separate day before the graduation ceremonies.

Schools with a small student population usually opt to give out all awards on graduation day itself. However, bigger schools may give out lesser awards on the day before, which is called Recognition Day or Baccalaureate Day. These awards include those for extra-curricular and co-curricular activities like Athlete of the Year and Dancer of the Year, as well as “good conduct” awards such as "Most Behaved" and "Most Neat and Clean". The number and name of the awards may vary from school to school, depending on whom the teachers wish to honor.

The major academic awards given out on graduation day for elementary and high school are the awards for valedictorian, salutatorian, and honorable mention. The schools usually give awards to their top five graduates as follows: valedictorian, salutatorian, and first, second and third honorable mentions. The other awards are usually the Leadership Award and the awards for those who topped the different subjects. The latter is usually referred to as the “Bests” since they start with the words “Best in...” such as, “Best in Math”.

College and post-graduate schools usually award the following awards: summa cum laude (with highest honors), magna cum laude (with high honors), and cum laude (with honors). Unlike the awards are given in elementary and high schools which depend on class ranking, undergraduate and post-graduate awards are given based on grade point averages, so that there may be more than one graduate with the same award, or in many cases, none at all.

Awards are usually given in the form of ribbons on which are printed the name of the award, or medals with the name of the award engraved on the back, as well as certificates.

=== Ceremony ===
Although ceremonies vary from school to school, certain basic elements are usually the same. A typical graduation ceremony starts with the processional, which in some cases consists of the graduating class and their parents who formally walk side by side into the venue for the ceremony. Some schools have the students leave their parents at their designated seats. Boys then go up on the stage from the left and girls from the right. The two lines meet in center stage and go down the front steps, each pair bowing to the audience just before they reach the top step.

After the processional comes the invocation, which may either be spoken or sung by a choir or by the graduates themselves. Then, the national anthem is sung and the salutatorian gives their salutatory address which serves as the welcome address or opening remarks. The keynote speaker is then introduced. This speaker may be a notable person, a person of some authority or influence, or even a former student who has made good in their chosen field and whom the school feels should be an inspiration to the graduates. After the keynote address, the school principal, or chancellor in the case of universities, presents the graduates to the representative of the appropriate government institution by having them stand up. The representative in turn declares the students are graduates. After the declaration, the graduates are then awarded their diplomas.

The actual diplomas usually are not awarded during the ceremonies; the graduates get their diplomas and other pertinent papers after they have complied with their clearance. In the past, schools usually handed out rolls of paper tied with a ribbon, symbolizing the diplomas. A graduate came on stage when their name was called, accepted the diploma with their right hand, then transferred it to their left hand and shook the hand of the person awarding the diploma. The graduate then went front and center, held a roll of paper at a slant between their hands, left hand at the bottom and right hand at the top, and bowed, then went down the steps and back to their seat. Present trends, however, are for schools to give out leatherette diploma holders during the ceremony, thus eliminating the need for the formal bow and expediting the ceremony. After awarding diplomas, the class valedictorian gives the valedictory address and leads the school pledge of loyalty. The graduates then sing their graduation song and the awards for outstanding graduates are then given out.

After the awards, the school principal then gives the closing remarks and the graduates may sing their closing song. The students and parents then exit the area with a formal recessional. However, they then usually return to have their souvenir pictures taken on the stage.

Candlelight ceremonies are usually held during high school junior-senior (JS) proms. However, some elementary schools in the provinces made candlelight ceremonies part of the graduation rites. In the original candlelight ceremony for proms, the senior class president usually lit a large ceremonial candle on the stage, then lit their own candle from this flame and symbolically “passed the flame” to the junior class president. The member of the senior class nearest the stage then went up to light their candle and went down to pass the flame to the other seniors, who would then give their lit candles to the juniors.

For elementary school graduation rites, the graduating class sings “One Little Candle” while the class valedictorian lights the ceremonial candle then passes the flame to the other graduates. The graduates blow out the flame together when they are declared graduates.

The graduation song is a vital part of the ceremony. It is considered a symbol of the graduating class and is usually chosen by the graduates, although in some cases the class adviser or the teachers may choose the song themselves. The graduates usually try to choose a song that will express their feelings about graduation. By tradition, Pomp and Circumstance March No. 1 is played at the processional stage of the ceremony, however Giuseppe Verdi's Aida, particularly the second act is also used. The use of the march originates when the Philippines was an American territory during the first half of the 20th century.

Some songs have been chosen repeatedly as graduation songs and have defined a generation in many cases. The Diana Ross song “If We Hold On Together”, for example, became the graduation song in many Philippine schools in the early 1990s. Other songs that Filipino students have chosen to sing during their graduation rites are “Farewell” by Raymond Lauchengco, “The Journey” by Lea Salonga, and “High School Life” by Sharon Cuneta.

“Garlands” are essential to graduations in the Philippines. These are usually made from ribbon, shaped into a lei, and adorned with “flowers” made from the same material. Fresh flowers are never used for graduation garlands, except for everlasting flowers. Some people create special garlands by tying individually wrapped candies end to end; these are usually popular with kindergarten and elementary school graduates. Recently, garlands made of seashells have also been given at graduation rite.

Many high schools now place stands beside the stage and hang garlands on them. When the graduates exit the stage after getting their diplomas, lowerclassmen usually put garlands on each of them. After the recessional, family and friends also place garlands around the necks of the graduates. Some people also give graduation gifts during this time; however, garlands are de rigueur.

== South Africa ==
At the University of the Witwatersrand (WITS), the graduation ceremonies are formal affairs, which include an academic procession by the faculty staff. The WITS choir is always present, and as a fun twist once the academic procession has left the hall, the song "I Got You (I Feel Good)" by James Brown is played over the loudspeakers.

== Sweden ==
In Sweden a high school graduation ceremony is celebrated as a tradition. The graduating students wear a student cap and celebrate the graduation ceremony. The students gather with their parents and well wishers, and rally on roads celebrating the high school graduation ceremony.

== United Kingdom ==
In the United Kingdom, unlike the United States, students do not usually 'graduate' from school below university level. They will normally leave secondary school or a sixth form college (if applicable) with specific qualifications, such as General Certificate of Education GCSEs and A-levels, Scottish Qualification Authority Standard Grades and Higher national courses or, less frequently, other certificates such as the International Baccalaureate. However, these are not usually presented in a formal ceremony.

Many university graduation ceremonies in the United Kingdom begin with a procession of academics, wearing academic dress. This procession is accompanied by music, and a ceremonial mace is often carried. After this, an official reads out the names of the graduates one by one, organized by class of degree and/or by subject. When their names are called, the graduates walk across the stage to shake hands with a senior official, often the university's Chancellor or the vice-chancellor. This may be followed by the conferring of an honorary doctorate to a highly accomplished guest where a citation is usually read by a member of staff of the relevant faculty/school/department. Graduands wear the academic dress of the degree they are receiving. A speech by the chancellor/vice-chancellor towards the graduates is delivered at the start or towards the end of the ceremony. The actual degree certificate is typically not given to the graduand during the ceremony itself and is instead sent by post to the graduand's home address.

Some of the older universities may hold their graduation ceremonies in Latin, even though few students understand this language. The Latin section of the ceremony may include a rendition of an anthem, sometimes called the unofficial anthem of all universities, the De Brevitate Vitae, also known as The Gaudeamus. Member institutions of the University of Wales hold their graduation ceremonies almost entirely in the Welsh language.

=== King's College London ===
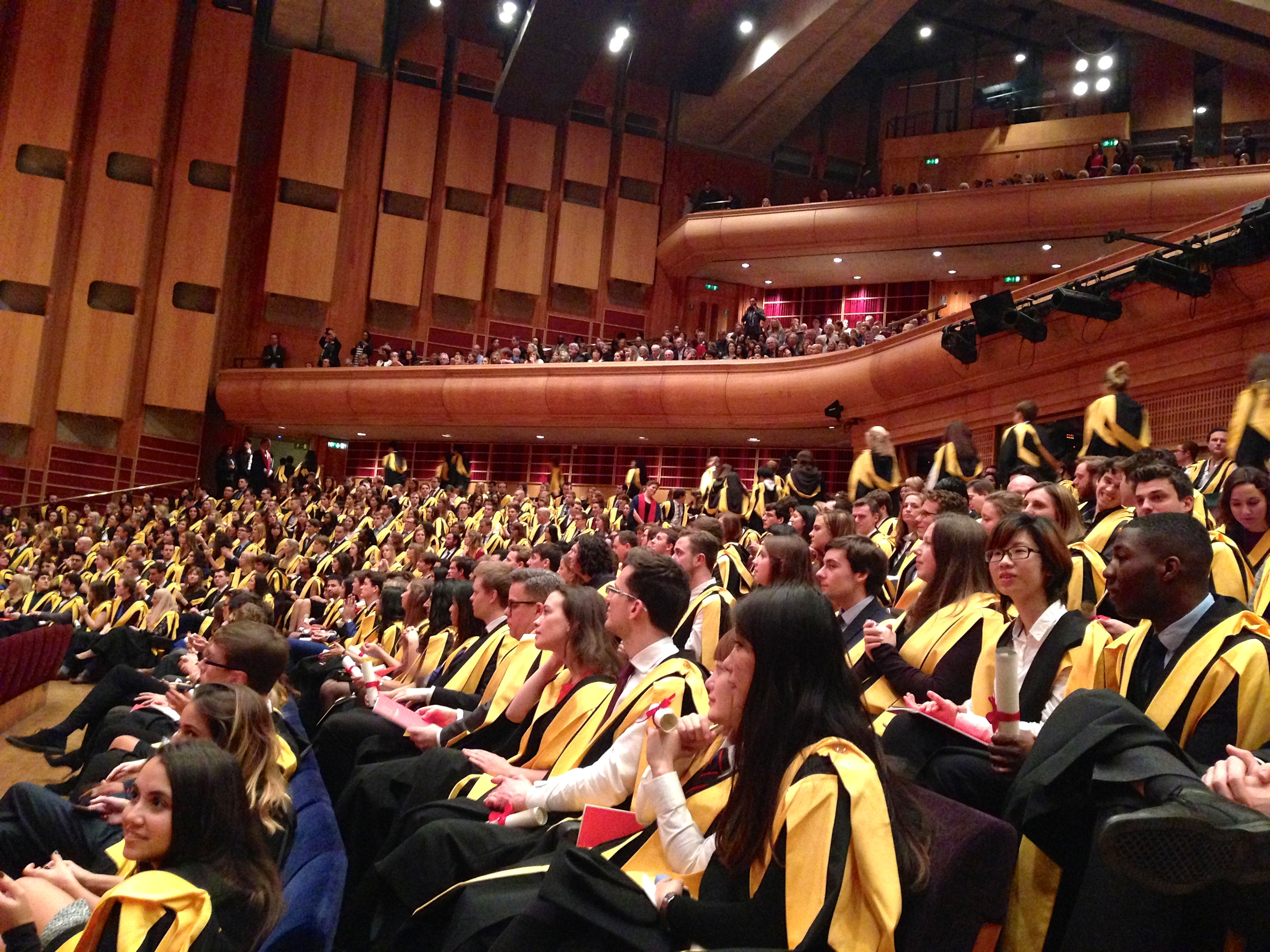
King's College London graduands wearing academic dresses without caps

At King's College London, the graduands shake the hand of the university's President & Principal (normally equivalent to a UK university's vice-chancellor). In addition, the hand of the Chairman of the King's College London Council, instead of its Chancellor (the senior official of University of London) is shaken. After being vested the power to award its own degrees from the University of London in 2006, graduates since 2008 wear an academic dress that does not feature a hat, designed by Dame Vivienne Westwood.

With the influence of the University of London's tradition, being the first university in the world to devise a system of academic dress based on faculty colours, the gowns and hoods have been designed with colours that reflect the university's faculties/schools/institutes of study and the level of the degree. Owing to its unique shape, the hood cannot be folded flat.

=== University of Oxford ===
At the University of Oxford graduands wear the dress of their status before graduating (their previous degree, or undergraduate academic dress), afterwards changing into the dress of the degree they have just received. Serving members of the armed forces may wear their military uniform underneath.

=== University of Cambridge ===
At the University of Cambridge, graduands are presented in the Senate House college by college. During the graduation ceremony, officially called a Congregation, graduands are brought forth by the Praelector of their college, who takes them by the right hand, and presents them to the vice-chancellor for the degree they are about to take. After presentation, the graduand is called by name and kneels before the vice-chancellor and proffers their hands to the vice-chancellor, who clasps them and then confers the degree. The graduate then rises, bows, and leaves the Senate House through the Doctor's door into Senate House passage, where they receive their diploma.

Graduands wear the academical dress to which they were entitled immediately before graduating, including the hood. If this dress does not itself include a hood (e.g. they are undergraduates becoming Bachelors of Arts), they wear the hood of the degree to which they are about to be admitted. Thus a Master of Arts (M.A.) about to become a Doctor of Philosophy (Ph.D.) wears the dress of an M.A. A graduate of another university who is not yet a Cambridge graduate wears a B.A. status (for those aged under 24) or M.A. status (24 or over) gown i.e. their previous academical dress, plus the hood of a Ph.D.

=== University of St Andrews ===
The degree ceremony at the University of St Andrews is conducted through a meeting of the Senatus Academicus in the Younger Hall, and dates back to the early antecedents of the University. The graduation is similar to many others, commencing with an academic procession (juniores priores/in reverse order of seniority) of the masters, Principal, the maces, and Chancellor, during which the graduands and their guests sing The Gaudeamus. Much of the ceremony is conducted in Latin. Once seated, the Prayer is read by the Dean of Divinity/Principal of St Mary's College. After this graduands are called forward individually by the Dean of the Faculty within which they are a member (Arts, Divinity, Medicine, and Science). The graduand comes to the graduation desk before the Chancellor (or in his absence, the Principal, acting in the capacity of Vice-Chancellor), proffering the hood of the degree that they are about to receive to the Bedellus, and kneels. The Chancellor then says:

"Te ad gradum Magistri Artium/Baccalaurei Scientiae/Baccalaurei Sacrosanctae Theologiae/Baccalaurei Scientiae Medicinae promoveo, cuius rei in symbolum super te hoc birretum impono."

("I promote you to the Degree of Master of Arts/Bachelor of Science/Bachelor of Divinity/ Bachelor of Medical Science, as a symbol of which I place this cap upon you.")

Succeeding graduates to the same degree receive the formula "Et super te" (and upon you also). The Chancellor then touches the graduand's head with the graduation cap, and the Bedellus steps forth and places the hood of the degree to be conferred over the newly promoted graduate. The graduate then rises and bows to the Chancellor, and exits the stage to collect their diploma, before joining their fellow graduates in the main hall. Once the ceremony is complete the Benediction is read, again by the Dean of Divinity, and the academic procession leaves the hall seniores priores/in order of seniority, with the new graduates joining the end as a sign of the accession to the academic community. The procession continues down North Street to the quadrangle of the United College of St Salvator and St Leonard, where it dissolves.

After each afternoon graduation, the General Council hosts a garden party for the new graduates and their guests, usually on the Lower College Lawn.

=== The Open University ===
Due to the large number and geographical dispersion of students, unlike most UK universities, degree ceremonies at the Open University are not the occasion on which degrees are formally conferred. This happens in absentia at a joint meeting of the University's Council and Senate ("congregation") on an occasion prior to and entirely separate from the ceremony - it is not unusual for Open University graduates to attend their degree ceremony some months (or even years) after they have formally graduated. The University's ceremonies – or "Presentations of Graduates" – occur Britain and Ireland throughout the year, usually in two batches; March to June, then September to November.

== South America ==
In some countries like Argentina and Uruguay, enthusiasm preveals over moderation with graduation parties, taking part an authentic carnival as part of the celebration that's mostly spontaneous, anarchic, and barely planned on the middle of the streets: hundreds of graduates, familiars and friends gather on open place, even the proximity of the study center, carrying alcoholic drinks, eggs, flour and other messy food and pelt it all over the graduates, where party is public and open to excesses that carry the complaints of al sorts of commerce, neighbours and authorities in the zone due to the concentration of public disorder and filth that lasts until the aftermath and overwhelms the municipal services.

== United States ==
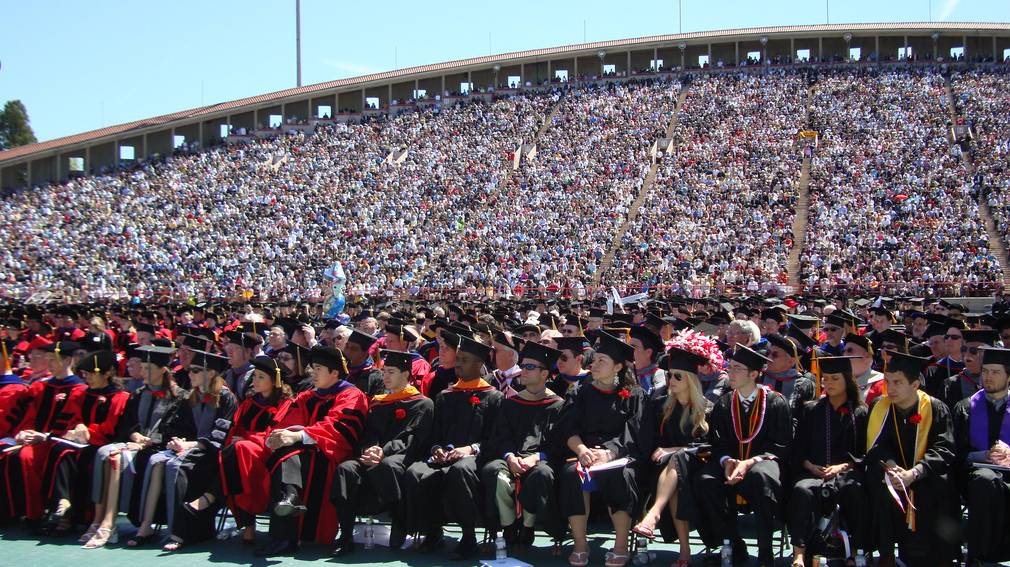
The 2008 commencement ceremony for Cornell University

In the United States, besides "commencement," the term "graduation" is also used in schools below university level such as the high school, middle school, and even kindergarten and preschool ceremonies.

The American Council on Education (ACE) in the US, and has developed an Academic Ceremony Guide and its policies on academic regalia are generally followed by most institutions of higher learning. The ceremony guide and the related Academic Costume Code provide the core of academic ceremony traditions in the US. The ACE code addresses college and university dress: high school and other lower school gown colors vary from institution to institution.

At many large US institutions, where many hundreds of degrees are being granted at once, the main ceremony (commencement) involving all graduates in a sports stadium, amphitheater, parade ground or lawn, or other large – often outdoor – venue is usually followed, but sometimes preceded, by smaller ceremonies (diploma ceremony) at sites on or around campus where deans and faculty of each academic organization (college, academic department, program, etc.) distribute diplomas to their graduates.

Another means of handling very large numbers of graduates is to have several ceremonies, divided by field of study, at a central site over the course of a weekend instead of one single ceremony. At large institutions the great number of family members and guests that each graduating student wishes to attend may exceed the capacity of organizers to accommodate. Universities try to manage this by allocating a specified number of graduation tickets to each student that will be graduating.

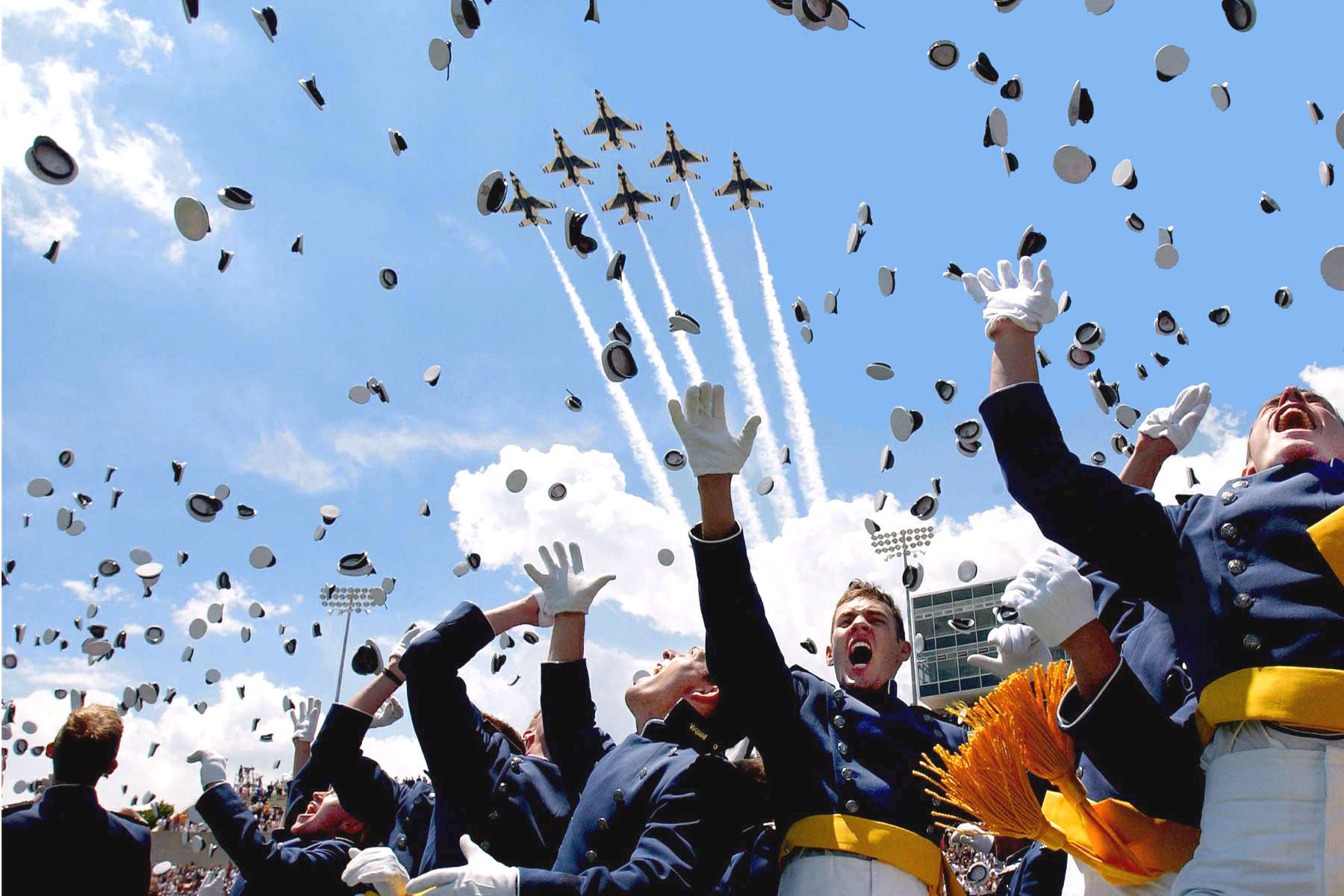
Traditional hat toss celebration at a graduation ceremony at the United States Air Force Academy

At most colleges and universities in the US, a faculty member or dean will ceremoniously recommend that each class of candidates (often by college but sometimes by program/major) be awarded the proper degree, which is then formally and officially conferred by the president or other institutional official. Typically, this is accomplished by a pair of short set speeches by a senior academic official and a senior institutional official:

"Mr. President, on behalf of the faculty of Letters and Science, I hereby declare that these candidates have met all the requirements for the degree of ... and request that such degree be conferred upon them." "Under the authority vested in me by the State of (?) and the Trustees of ? College, I hereby confer upon these candidates the degree of ..."

Many colleges and universities include a Hooding Ceremony in their commencement program, in which the students wear a hood. Most American institutions reserve this to advanced degrees though technically all graduates are entitled to wear a hood of the appropriate scheme and size. Candidates traditionally have the hood placed upon them at the podium, while other schools allow graduates to put on the hood by themselves en masse after the head of the university confers the degree upon them from the podium. This is called 'to self-hood'. Doctoral graduates are nearly universally hooded at the podium.

The hood is a part of traditional academic dress whose origins date back many centuries. Today, the hood is considered by some to be the most expressive component of the academic costume. Today’s hoods have evolved from a practical garment to a symbolic one. An academic hood is a symbolic garment, which is worn draped around the neck and over the shoulders, displayed down the back with the lining exposed. The hood’s length signifies the degree level; with the institution's colors in the lining and a velvet trim in a standardized color that signifies the scholar’s field.

=== Graduation speech ===
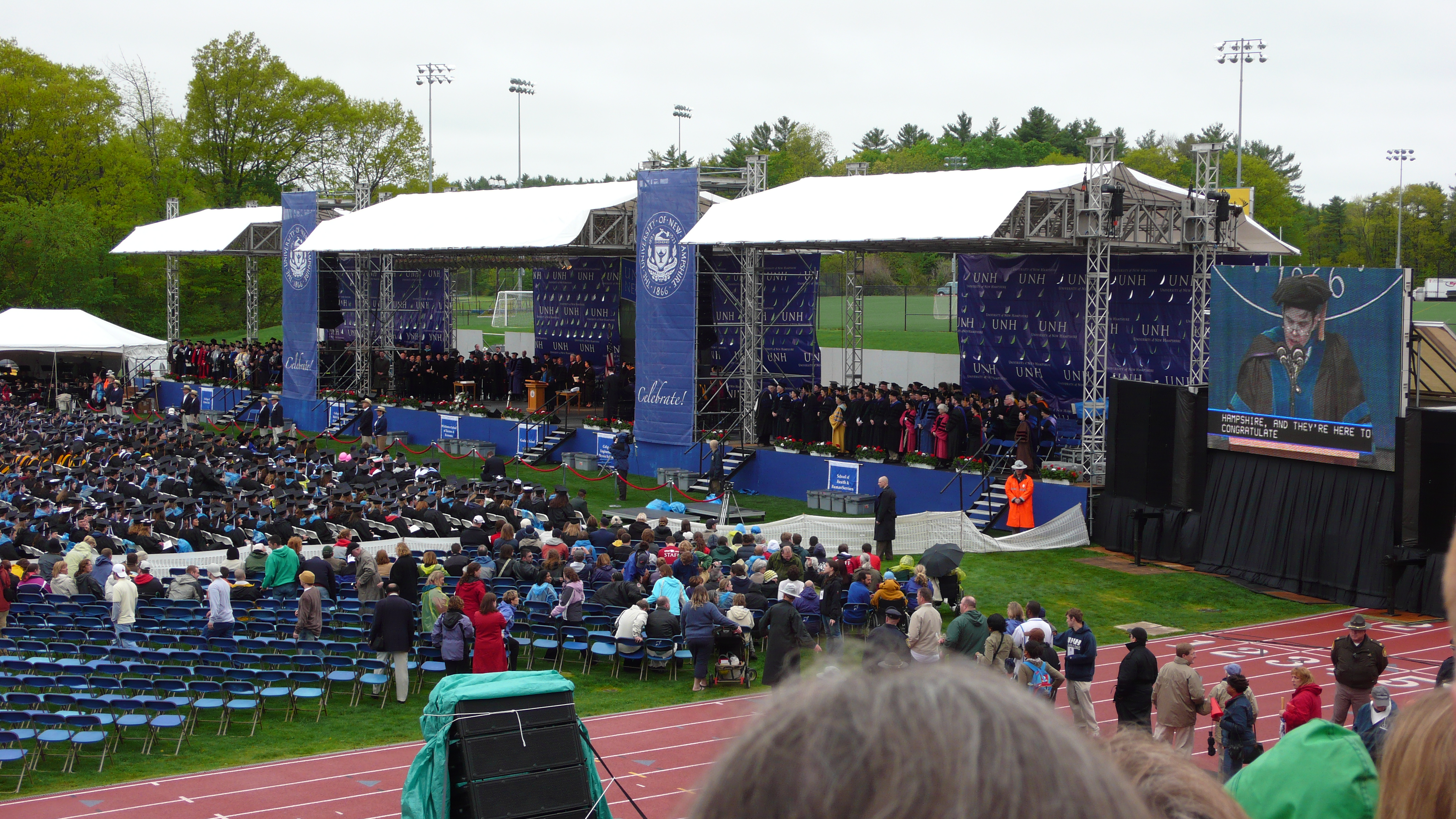
George H. W. Bush and Bill Clinton at the University of New Hampshire's 2007 commencement

A graduation or commencement speech, in the U.S., is a public speech given by a student or by alumnus of a university to a graduating class and their guests. Common themes of the graduation speech include wishing the graduates well in the "real world", cautioning that the world of academe is a special place where they were taught to think (a common variation contradicts this view). More recently, the trend has been to find a celebrity or a politician to deliver the speech.

Notable exceptions are Columbia University, Davidson College, and Belmont University, where the tradition has been that only the current university president gives the commencement address. Though there is only one commencement, individual colleges and schools of Columbia often invite a speaker at separate graduation ceremonies held earlier or on another day, however.

=== Special graduation ceremonies ===
Many homeschooling groups hold their own graduation ceremonies, as it is uncommon (and often not permitted) for homeschool graduates to participate in their local school district's official graduation ceremony. Some GED testing centers hold graduation ceremonies for those who take the GED and pass.

The parents and students of the class of 2009 in Centerburg, Ohio held their own unofficial graduation ceremony at the local park when the school board decided to cancel the official graduation ceremony, in response to a cheating scandal, even though only one person out of the entire 97-student graduating class was ever proven guilty of cheating. The school board's response was criticized by most media outlets in Ohio and even gained nationwide media coverage in the United States. The parents' and students' decision to hold their own graduation ceremony was cheered by many local businesses, and received mixed views, mostly through later letters to the editor of the Columbus Dispatch and other newspapers in the area.

=== Behavior and decorum issues ===
It is common for graduates not to receive their actual diploma at the ceremony but instead a certificate indicating that they participated in the ceremony or a portfolio to hold the diploma in. At the high school level, this allows academic administrators to withhold diplomas from students who are unruly during the ceremony, or whose friends and family disrupt the proceedings. Some schools have banned the sounding of bull horns by the relatives of graduating students.

High schools often inform guests at the start of a graduation ceremony that cheering for individual students should be reserved until all the student's names have been read, and their certificates collected.

At the college level, this allows students who need an additional quarter or semester to satisfy their academic requirements to nevertheless participate in the official ceremony with their cohort before receiving their degree. In addition, with large numbers of students receiving diplomas and often no specific order they walk in, it is impossible for their actual diplomas to be given to them at the ceremony, thus them receiving simply a blank diploma to be filled later.

=== Graduation parties ===
People often throw graduation parties to celebrate the event. These parties can be more general ones, or they can also be themed. Games can be present, as well as music. Flower leis can also be incorporated into celebrations for graduating students, particularly in Hawaii. Parties can also have a food truck rented out for them.
