= Education in Tokyo =

Various schools and universities serve Tokyo, Japan.

== Primary and secondary schools ==
Publicly run kindergartens, elementary schools (years 1 through 6), and junior high schools (7 through 9) are operated by local wards or municipal offices. Public high schools in Tokyo are run by the Tokyo Metropolitan Government Board of Education and are called "Metropolitan High Schools". Tokyo also has many private schools from kindergarten through high school.

== Tertiary education ==
Tokyo is home to many public and private universities, including the University of Tokyo, the most prestigious university in Japan.

=== Rankings ===
Universities in Tokyo ranked in the THE world university rankings 2024
Tier	Universities
1-100	University of Tokyo (World: 29th. National: 1st)
101-200	Tokyo Institute of Technology (World: 191st, National: 5th)
201-500	Tokyo Medical and Dental University (National: 10th)
501-800	Keio University (National: 14th)
801-1000	Tokyo Medical University (21st), Waseda University (22nd)

== See also ==
- Education in Japan
