= CoNETS =

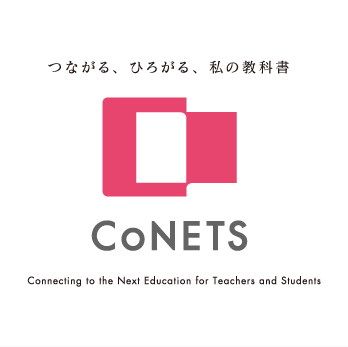

CoNETS (Connecting to the Next Education for Teachers and Students) is a consortium established in September 2013 by 12 textbook publishers and Hitachi Solutions to promote digital textbooks for primary and secondary schools in Japan.

== Members ==
The consortium consists of 13 companies. They are Dainippon Tosho, Jikkyo Shuppan, Kairyudo, Sanseido, Kyoiku Geijyutusha, Mitsumura Tosho, Teikoku-Shoin, Taishukan Publishing, Keirinkan, Yamakawa Shuppansha, Suken Shuppan, Nihon Bunkyou Shuppan and Hitachi Solutions.

The consortium began developing a virtual distribution platform for textbooks. The adopted data format for the platform is EPUB 3.

== Chronology ==
- September 5, 2013: Established.
- December 20, 2013: A prototype began testing at Ritsumeikan Primary School.
- May 21, 2014: A prototype was demonstrated at the fifth EDIX (Educational IT Solutions Expo).
- September 17, 2014: A prototype was demonstrated at EDUPUB Tokyo 2014.
