= Curriculum guideline (Japan) =

Standard specifying materials taught at Japanese schools

Flag of Japan

Curriculum guidelines (学習指導要領, Gakushū shidō yōryō) is a standard issued by the Ministry of Education, Culture, Sports, Science and Technology (MEXT) that specifies materials taught at all of elementary, junior and senior high schools in Japan, either public or private. The authority of the ministry to issue the standard is due to the enforcement regulations of the School Education Law (学校教育法施行規則, Gakkō kyōiku hō shikō kisoku). The ministry also publishes the commentary to the curriculum guidelines (学習指導要領解説, Gakushū shidō yōryō kaisetsu) that accompanies the guidelines. Nominally, the commentary is not legally binding. The Ministry of Education, Culture, Sports, Science and Technology prepares guidelines with the basic outlines of each subject taught in Japanese schools. Typically the guideline is revised every 10 years to update content and objective. Since 1886, the purpose of the official authorization system had been in effect to standardization and maintain neutrality on political and religious issues.

== Legality ==
The legal extent of the standard has been unclear. While the standard is not a law per se, court cases in the past have shown that it is legally binding to some extent. For example, in 1990, the High Court in Fukuoka ruled that a prefectural high school lawfully fired its teacher who taught a course in a way that violated curriculum guidelines.

== Length of study ==
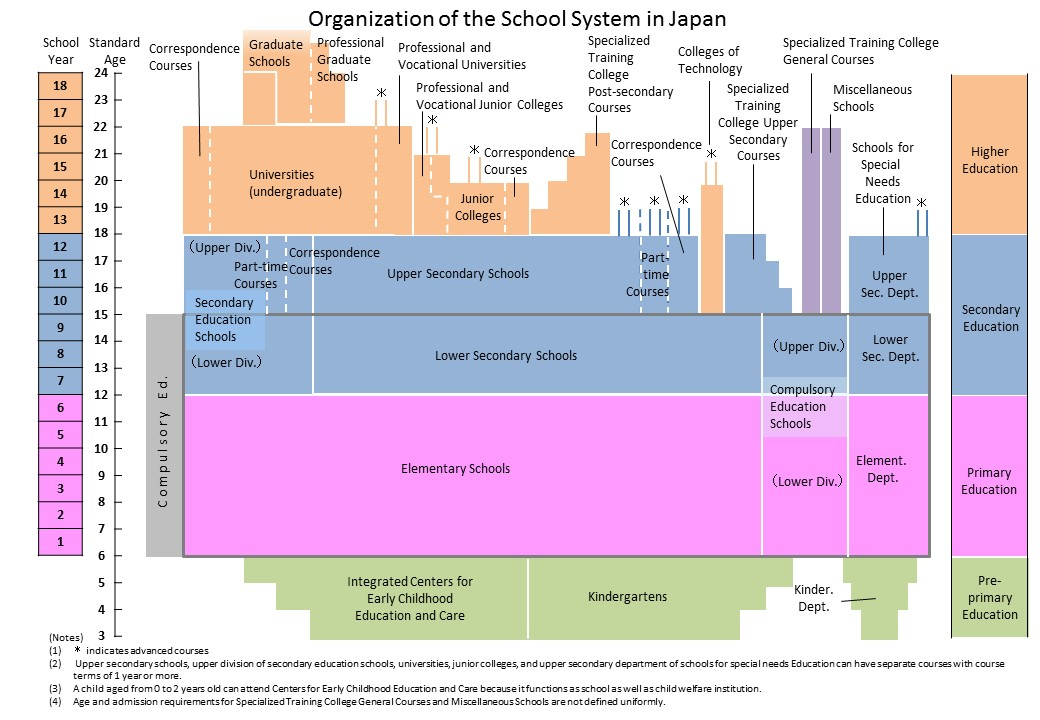
Age and organization of the school system in Japan

The Japanese school system length of study consists of six years of elementary school starting at age 6, following that would be three years of junior high school and another three years of high school. At the end of the study, the student should be around the age of 18. Students that pursue higher education typically will be attending school for another one to four years in vocational school, junior college, or university.

== Elementary school ==
During this period of time, the school curriculum covers Japanese, social studies, mathematics, science, music, arts and crafts, and physical education. This stage of learning usually starts at age 6 and continues for 6 years. A large share of time spent in elementary school is learning how to write and read Japanese katakana, hiragana, and kanji. Typically most students learn the English alphabet in the 4th grade. English is currently required in the 5th and 6th grade but is taught through informal activities rather than as a graded subject

== Junior high (middle) school ==
During junior high school, the student is typically between 12 and 15 years of age The standard curriculum for junior high school students requires the students to learn subjects such as Japanese language, social studies, mathematics, science, a foreign language, music, fine arts, health and physical education, and extracurricular activities. During this stage of school, the curriculum requires students to decide on a foreign language to learn that can consist of English, French, Korean, German..etc.

== High school ==
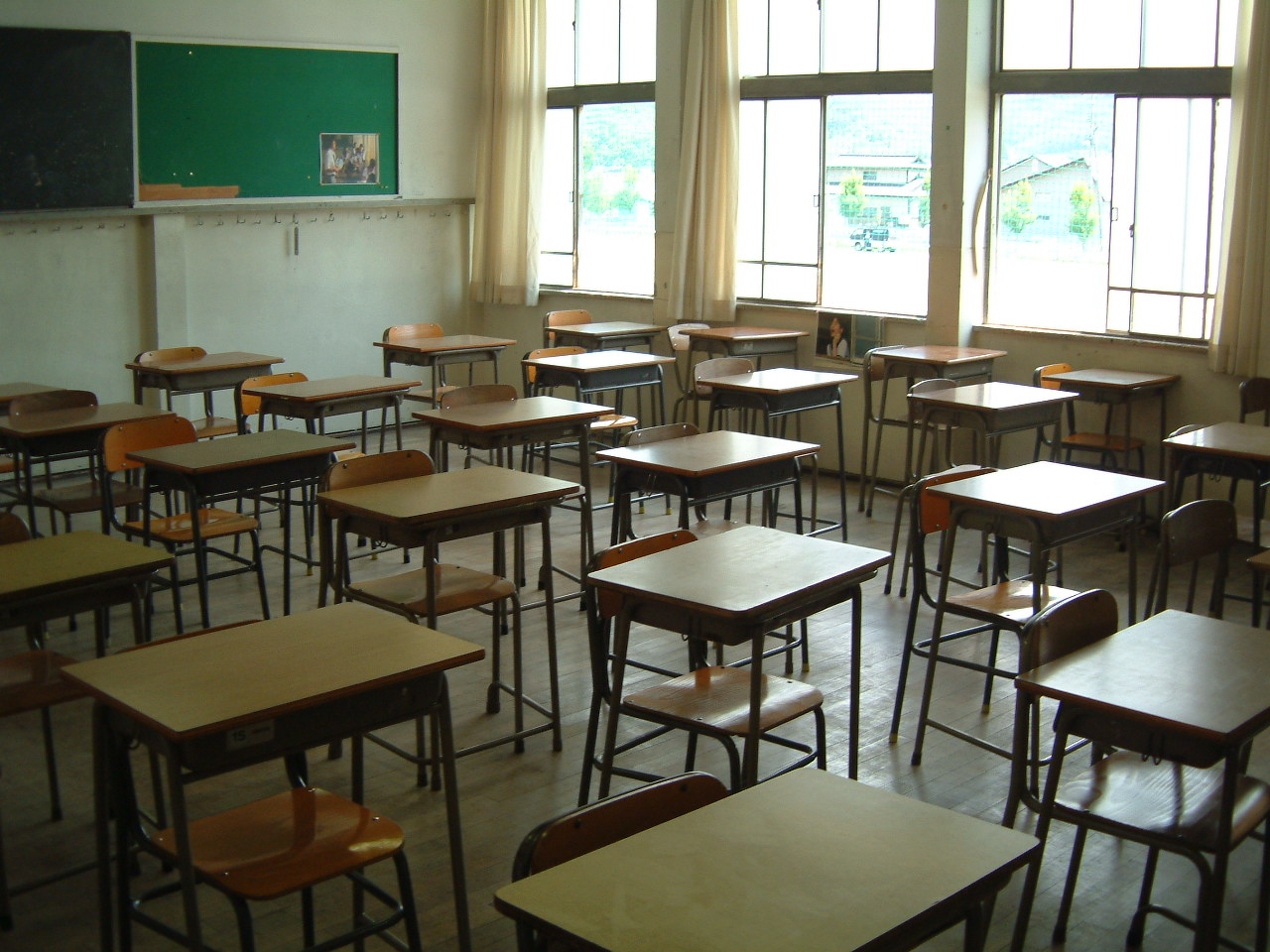
Japanese classroom

During high school, the student is typically between 15 and 18 years of age. The standard curriculum that most during this time study consists of Japanese language, geography and history, civics, mathematics, sciences, health and physical education, arts, foreign language, and home economics. It is not unusual to see students participate in extracurricular activities and integrated study which are required. Vocational programs are for students that takes courses in areas of studies such as business, industrial arts, and agriculture. Students in the program spend less time in the core curriculum subjects compared to regular students. After graduating from high school, students are now able to decide on higher education or to join the workforce and work.

== Extracurricular activities ==
Extracurricular activities are normal and required for students in Japan from elementary school up until high school. Most of these activities are under teacher or a responsible adult supervision and guidance. Typically these activities are done either before school hours or after school hours to avoid disrupting normal education flow. Most college bound students typically withdraw from club activities during their senior year in preparation for university entrance examinations Additionally, students participate in cram school. Approximately 60% of Japanese high school students go for supplemental lessons that specialize in preparing students for examination, these classes extend the student's school day into the evening hours and there is additional homework.

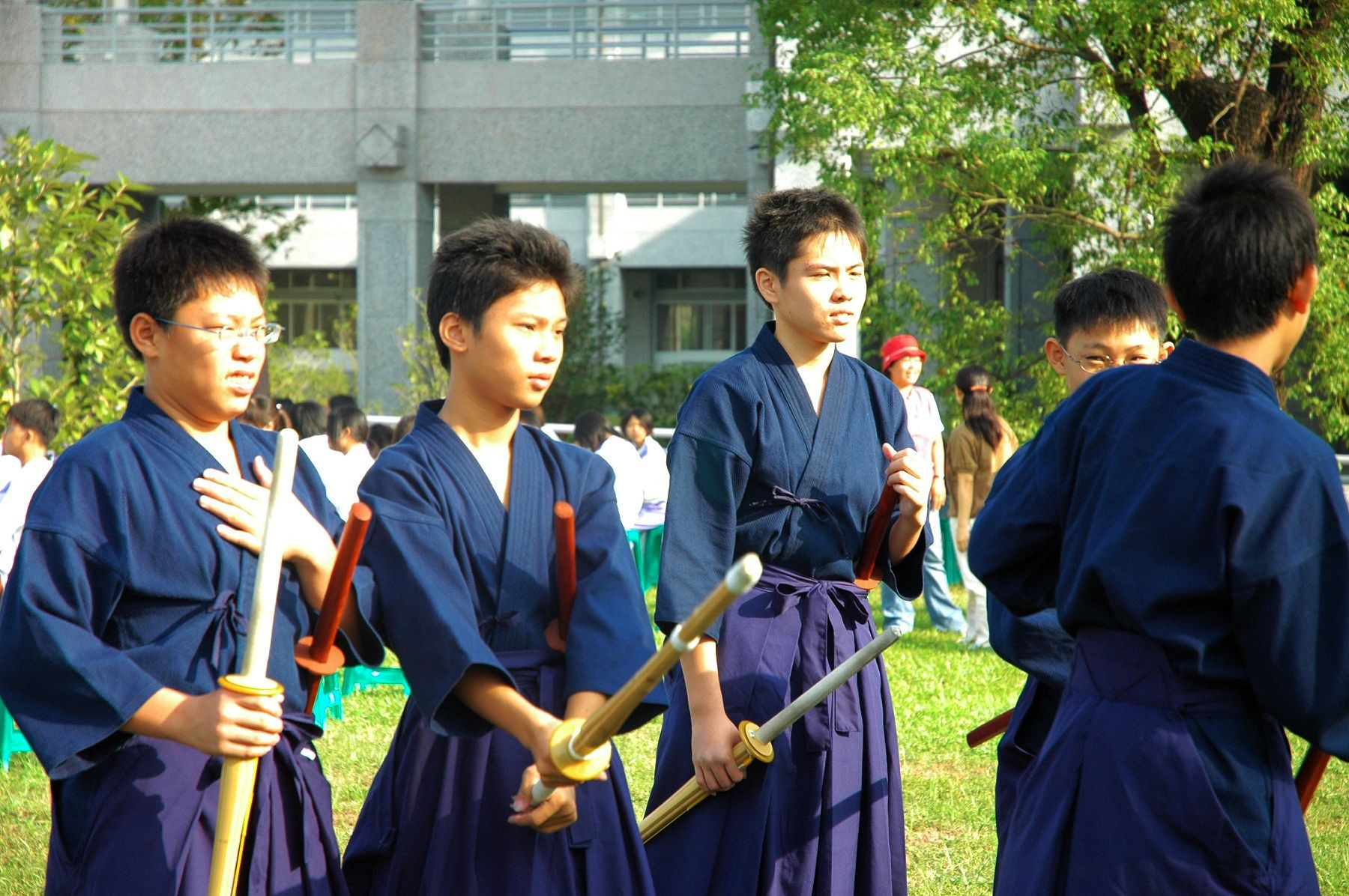
Kendo Club

Some activities students tend to join are listed below

- Baseball
- Soccer
- Volleyball
- Basketball
- Track and Field
- Swimming
- Judo
- Kendo
- School Band
- Shodo
- Cram School

== See also ==
- Japanese history textbook controversies
