= The East Is Red (1965 film) =

1965 communist musical by Wang Ping

- Film poster
- Directed by: Wang Ping; Li Enjie
- Based on: The East Is Red (1964 stage version) by Zhou Enlai
- Produced by: Zhou Enlai
- Starring: Tseten Dolma; Wang Kun; Guo Lanying
- Cinematography: Zhang Zhaobin; Dong Jian; Qian Jiang; Xue Boqing
- Edited by: Ji Xing; Shen Bingfeng
- Production company: August First Film Studio
- Release date: 2 October 1965
- Running time: 117 minutes
- Country: China
- Languages: Mandarin; Tibetan

The East Is Red (simplified Chinese: 东方红; traditional Chinese: 東方紅; pinyin: Dōngfāng Hóng), also known as The East Is Red: A Song and Dance Epic, is a 1965 Chinese film and musical directed by Wang Ping. It is based on an opera assembled by Zhou Enlai and presents an abridged history of the Chinese Communist Revolution and the Chinese Communist Party (CCP) under Mao Zedong's leadership. The film traces the revolution from the May Fourth Movement to the Civil War against the Nationalist Party, culminating in the CCP victory and the founding of the People's Republic of China (PRC). The East Is Red remains commercially available on CD, videos, and online platforms, usually with English subtitles.

== Background ==
=== Historical context ===
The East Is Red was originally a folk song called "Sesame Oil" or 麻油歌 from the Northwestern Shanxi Province of China. It was a love song with unknown authorship or exact date. In 1938, after the start of the Second Sino-Japanese War, the song was rewritten as "White Horse Tune" to inspire people in the fight against occupation by the Empire of Japan. After the rise of Mao as the leader of the Chinese Communist Party (CCP) in 1942 it was rewritten as "The Immigrant Song", until 1945 when it formally renamed into "The East in Red". This musical evolution illustrates a systematic alignment of traditional art with state ideology. The adaptation was not a passive aesthetic choice, but a deliberate political recontextualization. By stripping the original regional melody of its secular, private romantic meaning and replacing it with grand political praise, the production co-opted existing oral traditions. This transformation functioned as a powerful cultural apparatus designed to foster a mass personality cult and prime public consciousness for upcoming political campaigns.

=== Inspiration and creation ===
After Zhou Enlai saw "Revolutionary History Songs Singing" and "Singing Forward under the Banner of Mao Zedong", on July 30, 1964, Zhou convened the relevant officials at a meeting in Xi Hua Hall, Zhong Nan Hai, and made the final decision about launching the musical concert project, and this concert was named as "The East Is Red" during the meeting. Zhou Enlai served not only as the producer of The East Is Red but also as the chief political leader of the project. According to the oral history by director Huang Weixing, Zhou personally convened meetings with military and cultural officials to guide the structure, ideological tone, and even the naming of the performance. He emphasized that all members of the creative team should study the writings of Mao Zedong in order to ensure ideological consistency throughout the film, from choreography and set design to performance style and script. On October 2, 1964, The East is Red was performed for the first time in the Great Hall of the People in Beijing on the 15th anniversary of National Day. Wang Ping produced and directed the film. The East is Red was performed by little egret folk dance troupes.

While the massive 1964 stage performance successfully localized the production for political elites in Beijing, the immediate transition to a feature-length film directed by Wang Ping was a deliberate effort toward mass distribution. To function as an effective tool for national enlightenment, the production required a medium that could bypass geographical limitations. Adapting the stage play into a film allowed the state to broadcast this unified, ideological template to millions of viewers across rural China, establishing a nationwide collective consciousness.

According to the published articles by the main producers of The East Is Red, including Chen Yading, An Bo, etc., the individuals who took responsibility for drafting the basic format of the epic were required to learn about Mao's works first and use Maoism as a red line of the project. Performers of the epic hung up quotations from Mao at rehearsal venues. This rigorous political discipline and demand for ideological consistency translated directly into the film's visual language. The thematic requirement to prioritize the collective over the individual manifested as an aesthetic of strict visual order. Personal artistic expression was secondary to highly disciplined, symmetrical, and geometric mass choreography. On screen, the individual performer's body was effectively integrated into uniform, mechanized group formations to serve as a powerful visual symbol of an aligned and cooperative state apparatus.

== Summary ==
The East Is Red traces the history of the Chinese Communist Party under Mao Zedong from its founding in July 1921 to the establishment of the People's Republic of China in 1949. The musical details key events in CCP history, including the introduction of Communism to China through the October Revolution in Russia and the May Fourth Movement, the Northern Expedition, the KMT-led Shanghai Massacre of 1927, the Nanchang Uprising, and the formation of the People's Liberation Army (PLA), the Long March, guerrilla warfare of the PLA during the Second United Front during the Second Sino-Japanese War, the subsequent overthrow of the National Government of the Republic of China on Mainland China by the PLA in the decisive phase of the Chinese Civil War, and the founding of the People's Republic on October 1, 1949.

The East Is Red is divided into the following named acts:

- Prelude: Sunflowers Face the Sun
- Act I: Dawn of the East
- Act II: A Spark Ignites a Prairie Fire
- Act III: Overcoming a Thousand Rivers and Mountains
- Act IV: The Flames of Anti-Japanese Resistance
- Act V: Burying the Chiang Dynasty
- Act VI: The Chinese People Have Stood Up

Two additional acts were omitted from the final version under Mao's suggestion.

- Act VII: The Motherland Moves Forward
- Act VIII: The World Moves Forward

Act VII, The Motherland Moves Forward (祖国在前进, lyrics by Wang Jian, composer Gu Jianfen Jianfen), includes a song that is not mentioned, Chairman Mao, the Sun in our Hearts (毛主席，我们心中的太阳), by Shen Yawei.

== Film adaptation ==
Not long after its premiere, Zhou Enlai proposed a film adaptation of the production. In December 1965, Zhou invited the film artists of the National People's Congress and the Chinese People's Political Consultative Conference (CPPCC), as well as members of the director group of The East is Red, to the Great Hall of the People to hold a symposium on film shooting.

At this symposium, it was confirmed that the film would be a national-level production under close political supervision. Zhou oversaw choreography, costumes, and set design, while Jiang Qing personally reviewed every visual element, mandating that "costumes and props and each detail of the film were to be examined" under her direction. At the same meeting, Jiang Qing expressed her concern: "I am very worried about turning this large-scale music and dance epic into a film because The East is Red is not cohesive and coherent enough, the artistic effect is flat, and the revolutionary optimism is not prominent enough."

Despite these concerns, production proceeded and three movie companies came together to film it: Wang Ping, co-director Li Enjie, and August First Film Studio. Principal cinematography finished on September 18, 1965. The film was released on National Day of 1965. The original play's six main sections depicting the history of the CCP remained, while some scenes were cut. The film was released on October 2, 1965. The 1965 film adaptation of the original stage production expanded the reach by turning the original stage production at the great hall into a cinematic film medium. It allowed people who were unable to attend the live performance to witness the show again. Scholar Xiaomei argues that the film version allowed to reach a much wider audience the than the theatrical performance in 1964.

== Soundtrack ==
- Orchestra, ensemble and choirs – Overture: "The East is Red" (with dance)
- Orchestra, ensemble, and choirs – "Northern October Winds"
- Orchestra, ensemble, and choirs – "Over The Snowy Meadows"
- Orchestra, ensemble, and choirs – "Workers, Peasants and Soldiers, Unite!"
- Orchestra, ensemble, choirs and lady duettists – "(For the Red Army) Wooden Hunan Shoes"
- Orchestra, ensemble, and male choir – "Three Rules of Discipline and Eight Points for Attention" (Adaptation of the military anthem of China)
- Orchestra, ensemble, and choirs – "Looking At The North Star"
- Orchestra, ensemble and choirs – "Crossing the Dadu River" (with dance)
- Orchestra, ensemble, and lady soloist – "Song of the Yi People"
- Orchestra, ensemble, and male choir – "The Armies Have Reunited (Long Live the Red Army)"
- Orchestra, ensemble, choirs, and male soloist – "Long March"
- Orchestra, ensemble, and soloists – "Along the Songhua River" (Ballad of the Northeasters)
- Orchestra and ensemble- "March of the Volunteers" (1st performance)
- Orchestra, ensemble, and choir – "Song of the Military and Political University of Resistance Against Japan"
- Orchestra, ensemble, and choir – "Song of Guerrillas"
- Orchestra, ensemble, ladies choir, and soloist – "Nanniwan"
- Orchestra, ensemble and choirs – "Defend the Yellow River" from the Yellow River Cantata
- Orchestra, ensemble and choirs – "To the Rear of the Enemy"
- Orchestra, ensemble and choirs – "Unity is Power"
- Orchestra, ensemble and male choir – Military Anthem of the People's Liberation Army
- Orchestra, ensemble, choirs and duettists- "The Occupation of Nanjing by the Chinese People's Liberation Army" (One of Chairman Mao's poems)
- Orchestra and ensemble – "March of the Volunteers" (2nd performance) (National Anthem of the People's Republic of China, played at the beginning of Act 6, in the Tiananmen Square scene)
- Orchestra, ensemble and choirs – "Without the Communist Party, There Would Be No New China"
- Orchestra, ensemble, and male soloist – Paean
- Orchestra, ensemble, ladies choir and soloists – "Chairman Mao's Radiance"
- Millions of Serfs Stand Up
- Orchestra, ensemble and choirs – Finale: "Ode to the Motherland"
- Orchestra, ensemble, choirs and audience – "The Internationale" (Words by Eugène Pottier, music by Pierre Degeyter, Chinese translation by Qu Qiubai) Only the first verse is sung at the finale scene.

In the film, these songs are accompanied by exaggerated acting and dancing. Many scenes involve dancing girls pointing AK-47s. Singers featured in the film include Wang Kun, Tseten Dolma, Hu Songhua, and Guo Lanying.

The major songs of The East is Red continue to be popular in contemporary China, especially at concerts commemorating the anniversaries of the founding of the CCP, of the People's Liberation Army, and of the People's Republic of China.

== Analysis ==
The East is Red contains more than 30 songs in over two hours, mostly adapted from folk songs. "Deep Feelings" is adapted from the folk tune of the Yi nationality, the song of the Yueqin. In the prelude "Sunflowers Face the Sun", the sunflower motif represents Chinese people of all ethnic groups, with Mao Zedong as the sun. This is partly because starting in the 1940s, cultural workers took local rural love songs and "sanitized" them, replacing romantic or rustic themes with political lyrics to make them fit state standards.

The film's visual design emphasized geometric choreography and disciplined formations, expressing socialist ideals of collectivism and national unity. As dance scholar Jia Xiaoxiao notes, formations in group dances were constructed using symmetrical and angular patterns to symbolize ideological order. This aesthetic choice reinforced the narrative of a highly coordinated, politically aligned populace under centralized leadership.Furthermore, art historians note that The East is Red holds a significant status in Chinese dance history because it built a new framework for national song and dance that relies on multiple channels of art designed to transmit revolutionary history and cultural heritage.

The East is Red was the first occurrence of Han Chinese and ethnic minorities in China dancing together on the same stage. Many ethnic minorities are depicted happily singing and dancing. Additionally, the film incorporates both Mandarin and Tibetan dialogue, which was unusual for Chinese cinema of the time. This multilingualism—along with the costuming and casting of ethnic minorities—served to emphasize the CCP's message of ethnic unity. The film's use of language was part of its larger cultural strategy to visually and aurally represent a harmonious multiethnic state.

=== Plot ===
==== Prelude: Sunflowers Face the Sun ====
The prelude, Sunflowers Face the Sun, features a performance and dance of the titular song, The East Is Red.

==== Act I: Dawn of the East ====
Act I, Dawn of the East, starts with a long dance segment depicting the "Years of Suffering" preceding the PRC from subjugation under foreign influences and social divide. This stage borrows the folktale River Water (江河水) from the soundtrack. From the darkness, a dawn arises with the May Fourth Movement and the October Revolution in Russia, and the establishment of the CCP in 1921. The last song of the stage is Workers, Peasants and Soldiers, Unite! (工农兵联合起来).

==== Act II: A Spark Ignites a Prairie Fire ====
Act II, A Spark Ignites a Prairie Fire, consists of four parts. After the Northern Expedition, the Kuomintang turns against the Communists. The first part is the performance of The Righteous Song (就义歌). Autumn Harvest Uprising is the main part of the show. Meeting at Mount Jinggang is a performance composed of three songs, in which the duet of female voices, Straw Sandals for the Red Army (双双草鞋送红军), uses double voice polyphony to give the front section the characteristics of Jiangxi folk songs. It features the songs Three Rules of Discipline and Eight Points for Attention (三大纪律八项注意) and Fighting Against the Local Tyrants and Dividing the Land, which describes the people's complaints against their enemies.

==== Act III: Overcoming a Thousand Rivers and Mountains ====
In Act III, the song Overcoming a Thousand Rivers and Mountains highlights the Chinese Red Army of workers and peasants as they pass the time while trekking the difficult journey of the 9,000 km Long March through singing and dancing. The songs used in the program include Long March and Over Snowy Mountains and Grass (过雪山草地).

==== Act IV: The Flames of Anti-Japanese Resistance ====
Act IV, The Flames of Anti-Japanese Resistance, shows the plight of the Chinese people in the Second Sino-Japanese War since the Mukden incident, which consists of five parts. Along the Songhua River (松花江上) sets up the stage as it represents the fall of the northeast. The Kuomintang and the Communists are forced into an unstable alliance. This also presents the opening of the Anti-Japanese War with a guerrilla song that uses rhythmic drums. The performance, Mass Production, uses songs Nanniwan (南泥湾), Coming in February and Ten Songs in the Border Area from the Yan'an mass production movement.

==== Act V: Burying the Chiang Dynasty ====
Act V, Burying the Chiang Dynasty, has four sections. Following the victory over the Japanese in the Second Sino-Japanese War, Chiang Kai-shek launched a final gambit with the support of the American imperialists to destroy the Communists. Among them, the songs Unity is Strength (团结就是力量) and Not Afraid to Go to Jail (坐牢算什么) show that the CCP has vowed to come together and defend the oppressed people of China. March Dance and A Million Heroes Crossing the River express the party's victory over the Kuomintang through dance. The song The Sky Above the Liberated Zone (解放区的天) celebrates the victory of the PLA and represents the long-awaited liberation of the people of China. The People's Liberation Army Occupies Nanjing (人民解放军占领南京) marks the end of Act V, with the Kuomintang flag thrown off the Presidential Palace.

==== Act VI: The Chinese People Have Stood Up ====
Act VI, The Chinese People Have Stood Up, begins with the singing of the new national anthem March of the Volunteers (义勇军进行曲) and the song Without the Communist Party, There Would Be No New China (没有共产党就没有新中国). It starts with the songs Ode (赞歌) by Hu Songhua and Chairman Mao, I Wish You a Long Life (毛主席，祝你万寿无疆) by Tseten Drolma. After that, the following segments, Ode to the Motherland (歌唱祖国) and The Internationale (国际歌) further praise the achievements of victory.

==== Act VII: The Motherland Moves Forward ====
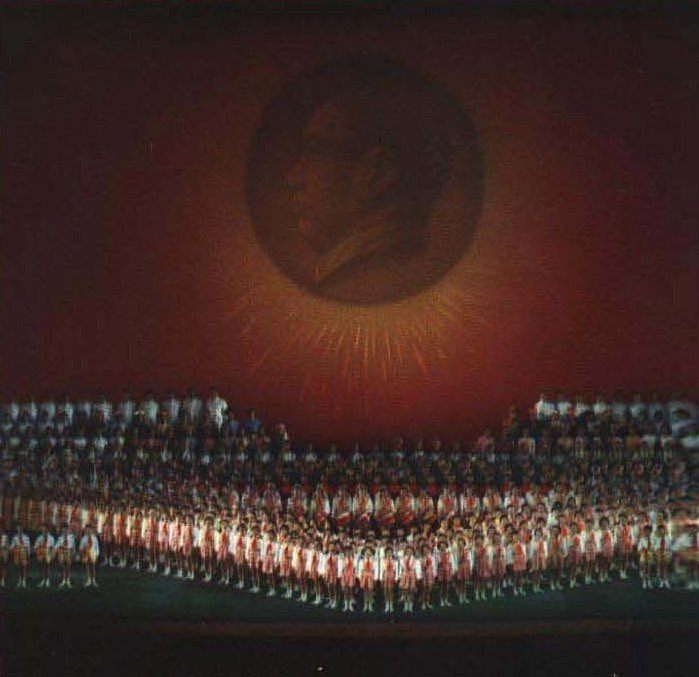
A 1964 production of the song We Are the Inheritors of Communism

Act VII, The Motherland Moves Forward, cut from the final version of the production, contained the song Socialism is Good (社会主义好), and depicted life in the newly formed People's Republic of China, and the eventual liberation of Taiwan by the Communists in the song We Must Raise the Banner of Victory over Taiwan (一定要把胜利的旗帜插到台湾), and a celebration of the triumphs of communism in China, with the song We Are the Inheritors of Communism (我们是共产主义接班人).

==== Act VIII: The World Moves Forward ====
Act VIII, The World Moves Forward, cut from the final version of the production, depicted the global spread of communism and world revolutions, expressed in the song Workers of the World, Unite (全世界无产者联合起来), finally ending in one last performance of The Internationale.

=== Legacy ===
Scholars consider The East Is Red a landmark in the revolutionary “music-and-dance epic” genre, blending operatic performance, folk elements, and socialist realism into a unified form of propaganda art. According to Lu Chen, the work "integrates music, dance, poetry, art, and other art forms" to convey political ideology, history, and collective memory, and helped pioneer "a new way of national song and dance."

This visual and musical format would go on to influence later state productions, such as the PLA's 1984 stage spectacle The Laud for the Chinese Revolution and the 2009 patriotic film Road to Revival. These works echo the stylistic conventions of The East Is Red—mass choreographed ensembles, musical narration of revolutionary history, and a fusion of multiple performance disciplines—cementing the film's lasting legacy in Chinese visual and political culture.

In addition to its domestic impact, The East Is Red was also shown abroad, especially in socialist-aligned countries during the 1960s. Although its circulation in Western countries was limited, the film served as a symbolic export of Maoist ideology. Scholar Chen Xiaomei argues that it presented international audiences with a stylized vision of revolutionary China, functioning as “a curated cultural performance of national triumph and ideological purity.”

== Related artworks ==
The Laud for the Chinese Revolution (simplified Chinese: 中国革命之歌; traditional Chinese: 中國革命之歌; pinyin: zhōngguó gémìng zhī gē), also rendered in English as The Song of the Chinese Revolution, is a 1984 Chinese film directed by the People's Liberation Army (PLA) Movie Studio (namely the August First Film Studio), depicts the history of China, as depicted by the CCP, from 1840 (the Opium War) to 1984 to celebrate the 35th anniversary of the People's Republic of China. This film is considered the second grand song-and-dance epic of the PRC with the support of the central government, following The East Is Red.

The Road to Revival (simplified Chinese: 复兴之路; traditional Chinese: 復興之路; pinyin: fùxīng zhī lù), was produced by the Central Propaganda Department of the Chinese Communist Party, the Ministry of Culture, the Chinese National Broadcasting Bureau, Political Headquarters of the People's Liberation Army and the Beijing City Government. It is a 2009 Chinese film created for the celebration of the 60th anniversary of the PRC. The narrative of The Road to Revival extends its narrative to the post-Mao period.
