= Wang Kun (singer) =

- Born: 1925; Tang County, Hebei, China
- Died: 2014 (aged 88–89); Beijing, China
- Education: Yan'an Lu Xun Institute of Arts
- Years active: 1954-2010
- Spouse: Zhou Weizhi (m. 1943–2014)
- Children: Two sons
- Musical career
- Genres: Mandopop

Wang Kun (Chinese: 王昆; pinyin: Wáng Kūn; 1925 – 21 November 2014) was a Chinese opera singer, actress, musical director, and teacher specializing in revolutionary repertoire. She was most famous for her leading role in the opera The White Haired Girl, and her interpretations of songs such as "Nanniwan" (1943).

In 1982, she became director of the Oriental Song and Dance Company, and educated a number of influential singers including Yuan Zheng, Zheng Xulan, and Zhu Mingying. Although she mainly sang revolutionary songs herself, Wang was an ardent supporter of popular music in the early 1980s, when such music was the target of heavy criticism in the wake of the Cultural Revolution. Her personal approval of Cui Jian, now known as the "Father of Chinese Rock", gave the singer the opportunity to debut at a major 1985 concert organized by the Oriental Song and Dance Company.

Wang Kun's husband Zhou Weizhi was an influential musician who served as acting Minister of Culture of the PRC. They were married from 1943 until 2014, when the couple both died within a period of three months.

== Biography ==
Wang was born in 1925 in Tang County, Hebei. In the 1940s, she joined the performing arts troupe of the People's Liberation Army. In 1945, she played the lead role in The White Haired Girl (modern China's first Western-style opera), produced by the Yan'an Lu Xun Institute of Arts (延安鲁艺戏剧音乐系), and also performed in other modern dramas.

Along with her contemporary Guo Lanying, Wang was a member of the first generation of Chinese performing artists to train overseas. Following the Chinese Communist Revolution in 1949 she continued studying music in the USSR with Medvedev, as well as with the Chinese singer Lin Junqing (林俊卿). In 1954 she entered the Central Conservatory of Music, to further her education. She later directed the Oriental Song and Dance Company (东方歌舞团), serving as regimental commander.

She was a member of the committee of the fourth session of the China Federation of Literary and Art Circles (CFLAC) and the Chinese Musicians' Association, and she participated in the second and third sessions as director of the executive committee for the fourth session of the All-China Women's Federation. She was the Chinese Communist Party's 11th representative for the first, second, and third National People's Congress, and was also a member of the National Committee of the Chinese People's Political Consultative Conference for the fifth and sixth National People's Congress. She performed in the large-scale music and dance drama and film, The East Is Red in the 1960s.

Her singing was praised by China's tops leaders Mao Zedong and Zhou Enlai, but that did not prevent her and her family from being persecuted during the Cultural Revolution. She was labelled a counterrevolutionary and imprisoned by the Red Guards. She was rehabilitated after the Cultural Revolution.

Wang's singing style draws on Chinese folk traditions for its foundation, though her vocal production (featuring a bright timbre and consistent vibrato) also shows elements of borrowing from Western bel canto operatic style. Besides "Nanniwan", her famous recordings include the songs "Joy of Emancipation" (翻身道情), "Autumn Harvest" (秋收), and "Peasants' Association" (农友歌). Her notable students included Li Lingyu and Ai Jing. In September 2005, she was hired by the China Institute of Art Research (中国艺术研究院) as a special master's tutor. On 9 August 2009, she performed with her students in a concert commemorating her 70-year performing career, organized by the Chinese Ministry of Culture and the CFLAC. Chinese Premier Wen Jiabao sent a congratulatory letter to the show.

Wang Kun died on November 21, 2014 at the age of 89.

== Personal life ==
Wang married musician Zhou Weizhi in 1943. Zhou later served as Minister of Culture of the PRC. They had two sons. Zhou died in September 2014, at the age of 98, and Wang died shortly afterwards on 21 November 2014, aged 89.

Her little brother Wang Zhongqi was a Chinese engineer who was a professor at Harbin Institute of Technology, and an academician of the Chinese Academy of Engineering.
