= Osmanthus Flowers Blooming Everywhere in August =

Chinese Red Army folk song

Osmanthus Flowers Blooming Everywhere in August (Chinese: 八月桂花遍地开; pinyin: bāyuè guìhuā biàndì kāi) is a Chinese Red Army folk song from Sichuan province, and is among the best-known revolutionary songs from the wartime and Maoist periods in China.

The song is based on a folk melody called "Eight Pieces of Brocade" (八段锦; bā duàn jǐn) from the Dabie Mountains where the Eyuwan Soviet was based. The revolutionary version of the song was very popular during the Cultural Revolution of the 1960s; Deputy Secretary of Defence General Tan Zheng's wife, captain Wang Changde, used to sing the song on his visits to the troops in the early 1960s, prior to his imprisonment during the Cultural Revolution. It was featured in the 1964 musical The East is Red, and is now regarded as one of the most popular "new" folk songs.
