= Guo Lanying =

Chinese musical artist (1929–2026)

- 郭兰英
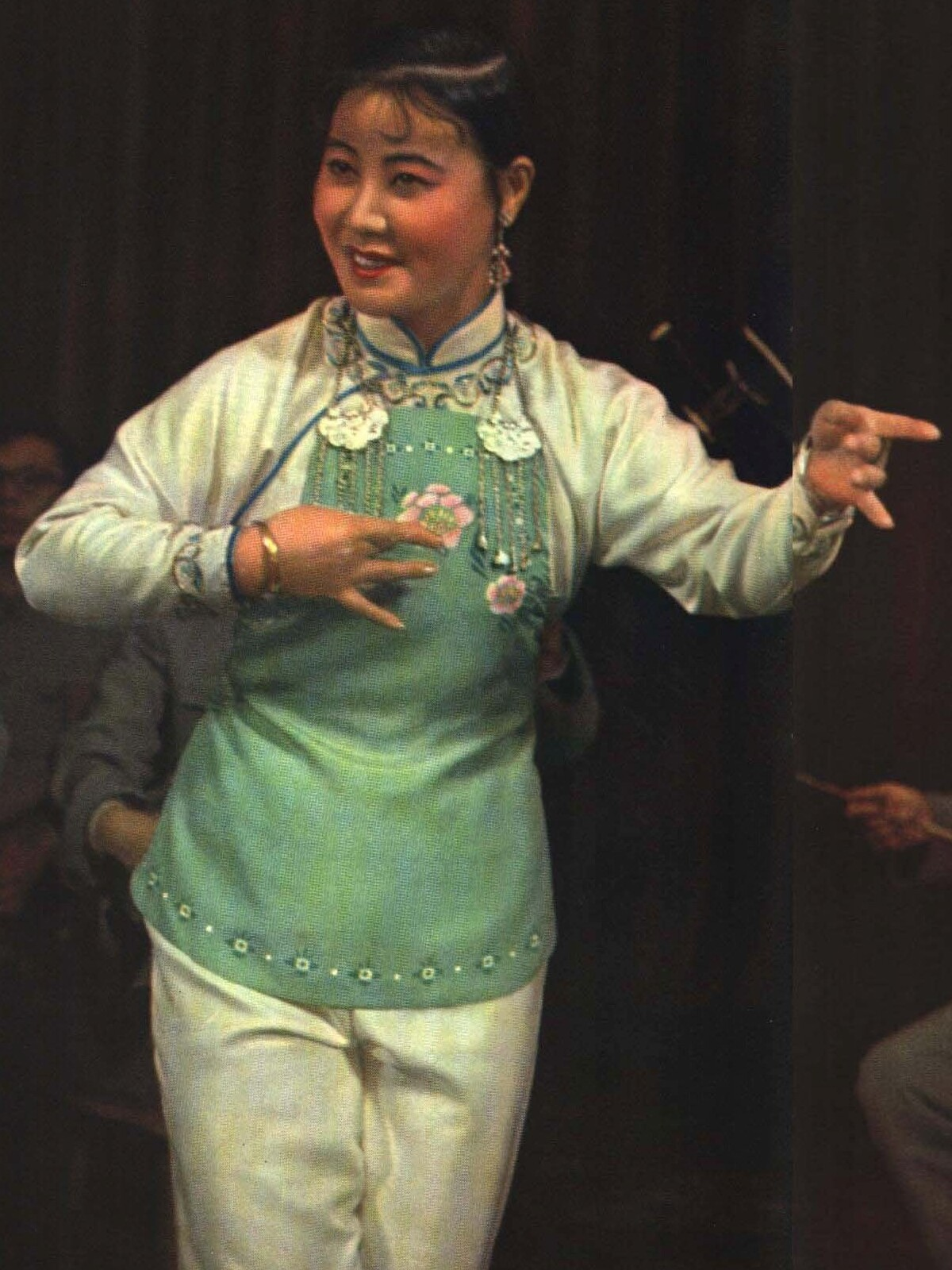
- Lanying in 1964

Delegate to the National People's Congress (1st, 2nd, 3rd, 5th, 6th)
- In office September 1954 – January 1975
- Chairman: Liu Shaoqi; Zhu De
- Constituency: Shanxi
- In office February 1978 – March 1988
- Chairman: Ye Jianying; Peng Zhen
- Constituency: Shanxi

Personal details
- Born: 31 December 1929 Pingyao, Shanxi, China
- Died: 11 August 2026 (aged 96) Guangzhou, Guangdong, China
- Occupation: Singer
- Musical career
- Genre: Chinese Music
- Instruments: Vocal
- Years active: 1946–1982

Guo Lanying (Chinese: 郭兰英; 31 December 1929 – 11 August 2026) was a Chinese operatic soprano best known for singing patriotic songs such as "My Motherland" (1956) and "Nanniwan" (1943).

== Life and career ==
Guo Lanying was born in Pingyao, Shanxi, China on 31 December 1929, into a poor family in Pingyao, central Shanxi. She began studying Shanxi bangzi, a form of local opera, at the age of six. She performed with the local theatrical troupe in Taiyuan, the provincial capital, at the age of 11.

In the 1940s, she majored in opera at North China United University (华北联合大学) and performing with that university's Song and Dance Troupe. With that troupe, she performed many dance dramas.

Following the Chinese Communist Revolution, Guo became the chief performer in the Song and Dance Theatre of the Central Conservatory of Music, Central Experimental Opera, and China Opera House. She played the leading roles in many new operas, including The White Haired Girl and The Marriage of Little Er Hei. In the 1960s she appeared in the film The East Is Red.

Along with the singer Wang Kun, she was a member of the first generation of Chinese performing artists to train overseas. She visited the Soviet Union, Romania, Poland, Czechoslovakia, Yugoslavia, Italy, Japan, and other nations.

Guo retired in 1982, continuing to teach at the China Conservatory of Music in Beijing. In 1986 she established the Guo Lanying Art School in Guangdong.

Guo died in Guangzhou on 11 August 2026, at the age of 96.

== See also ==
- Wang Kun (singer)
