= Nhạc đỏ =

Revolutionary music genre in Vietnam

- Stylistic origins: Chamber music, musical traditions
- Cultural origins: Early 1945, urban area, Tonkin

Fusion genres
- March; Suite; Valse; Slow waltz; Ballad; Slow surf; Blues; Chachacha; Disco; Rumba; Opera; Symphony; Country

Other topics
- Revolutionary opera; revolutionary song; red music

Nhạc đỏ or literally "red music", is the common name of the revolutionary music (nhạc cách mạng) genre in Vietnam. Red music was formed during the communist Việt Minh and the First Indochina War and later strongly promoted across communist North Vietnam during the Vietnam War, to urge Northerners to achieve reunification under the Workers' Party of Vietnam and fight against the "American imperialist puppet" in South Vietnam. Other forms of non-traditional, non-revolutionary music and culture in the North, like Vietnamese popular music and Western music and culture, were banned, being labelled as "counter-revolutionary", "bourgeois", or "capitalist".

One of the earliest composers of revolutionary songs was Đinh Nhu (1910–1945). Trọng Tấn (born 1976) is considered the young "Hoàng tử nhạc đỏ" (Prince of Red Music).

== See also ==
- Political music in China — red music in China
