= Begum Dolly Azad =

Bangladeshi politician

- ডলি আজাদ; ڈولی آزاد

Member of 4th National Assembly
- In office 1965–1969
- President: Ayub Khan
- Preceded by: Shamsunnahar Mahmud
- Constituency: NE-77 (Women's Reserved Seat-II)

Personal details
- Born: Kamar Jehan Sekandra Begum Bogra, Bengal Presidency
- Died: 1994 Abu Dhabi
- Party: Pakistan Muslim League
- Spouse: Khwaja Mohammad Azad
- Children: Aaliya Azad (daughter); Ashfaque Azad (son); Atique Azad (son); Azra Azad (daughter)
- Relatives: Khwaja Atiqullah (father-in-law)

Kamar Jehan Sekandra Begum, better known as Begum Dolly Azad (Bengali: বেগম ডলি আজাদ, Urdu: بیگم ڈولی آزاد), was an East Pakistani politician.

== Early life and family ==
Begum was born into a Muslim family in Bogra District, Bengal Presidency, British Raj. She resided in 19 New Eskaton Road, Ramna Thana, Dacca after marrying Khwaja Mohammad Azad of the Dhaka Nawab family, where she inherited vast amounts of land. Mohammad Azad was an officer among the lieutenants of East Pakistan Army.

== Career ==
In 1949, Azad became a founding member of the All Pakistan Women's Association (which later became the Bangladesh Mahila Samiti). She played an active role during the Association's 5th Triennial Conference in Dacca, which was held in February 1968.

She became a member of the 4th National Assembly of Pakistan as a representative of East Pakistan in 1965. In 1966, she requested the government of Pakistan to increase the number of reserved seats for the women in the National Assembly. She visited China as part of a two-week Pakistani delegation, in which she sang a Chinese patriotic song called Unity is Strength.

With the aftermath of the Bangladesh Liberation War and subsequent Independence of Bangladesh, Azad abandoned her residence and migrated to West Pakistan. Her home was later gifted to the families of Serajuddin Hossain and Abul Kalam Azad who were said to have been killed by Al-Badr forces during the war. She later returned to the property, and a court case took place between Azad against the families residing there.
