= Anthem of China (disambiguation) =

Anthem of China may refer to:

- "March of the Volunteers", the national anthem of China
- "National Anthem of the Republic of China", the national anthem of Taiwan and of China until 1949
- Military anthem of China
- "National Flag Anthem of the Republic of China", used by Taiwan in place of a national anthem at some sporting events
- Historical Chinese anthems
