= The Road to Revival =

2009 Chinese musical film

- Directed by: Zhang Jigang
- Release date: 1 October 2009
- Country: China
- Language: Mandarin

The Road to Revival (simplified Chinese: 复兴之路; traditional Chinese: 復興之路; pinyin: fùxīng zhī lù) is a 2009 Chinese musical film created for the celebration of the 60th anniversary of the People's Republic of China. It portrays the historical period from 1840 through contemporary China. Directed by Zhang Jigang, the production featured 3,200 performers and was staged on an arching structure as large as a multi-story building and on a raked stage.

== Development ==
The Road to Revival is a 2009 Chinese film created for the celebration of the 60th anniversary of the PRC. Director Zhang Jigang conceived of the production as built around performance spaces that combined "performance art in the square" with "performance art on a stage".

The Road to Revival had a cast of 3,200 performers.

The musical was staged on an arching structure as large as a multi-story building and used a raked stage.

== Narrative ==
Throughout the musical, an LED screen displays historical material including photographs, paintings, and documentary clips, portraying events like the burning of the Summer Palace by the Eight-Nation Alliance in 1900, worker and peasant movements of the 1920s, the Long March, development of China's nuclear weapons, the launching of Chinese satellites, and the return of Hong Kong and Macau to China.

A large chorus observes the historical events as they unfold on stage. Academic Xiaomei Chen compares their function to that of a Greek chorus.

The five acts are:

1. "A Memorial to the Anguished Land" (covering 1840-1921)
2. "An Epic of Heroic Martyrs" (covering 1921-1949)
3. "A Portrait of Socialist Pioneers" (covering 1949-1978)
4. "A Melody of the Great Waves" (covering 1978-2008)
5. "Praise for a Magnificent China" (contemporary).

== Release ==
The Road to Revival premiered as a stage musical at Great Hall of the People in Beijing in September, 2009. It was filmed and released as a movie for National Day on October 1, 2009.

== See also ==
- The East is Red
- The Song of the Chinese Revolution
- Political music in China
- Cinema of China
