= Common Regulations of the People's Liberation Army =

The Common Regulations of the People's Liberation Army (Chinese: 中国人民解放军共同条令), also known as the "Three Major Regulations" (Chinese: 三大条令), include the Regulations on Internal Affairs of the People's Liberation Army, the Regulations on Discipline of the People's Liberation Army, and the Regulations on Formations of the People's Liberation Army, which are the basic disciplinary system and regulations of the People's Liberation Army (PLA).

== History ==
As early as 1930, the Chinese Red Army promulgated the "Draft Regulations on Discipline of the Chinese Workers' and Peasants' Red Army". In August 1936, after the Red Army arrived in northern Shaanxi, it formulated and issued the "Provisional Internal Affairs Regulations of the Chinese Workers' and Peasants' Red Army". The formulation of the "Formation Regulations" was not put on the agenda until after the founding of the People's Republic of China.

The term "common regulations" first emerged in 1951, when the then Central Revolutionary Military Commission proposed to "formulate common regulations to unify the discipline and system of the entire army." Under the leadership of Mao Zedong, Zhou Enlai, Liu Bocheng and others, and with the participation and guidance of Soviet military advisers and experts in China, the formulation of various military regulations was fully launched. The three regulations, "Internal Affairs Regulations," "Discipline Regulations," and "Formation Regulations," were promulgated together and collectively referred to as "common regulations." This usage is still used today. The common regulations are the basic regulations that must be observed by the Chinese People's Liberation Army, from the leadership to the grassroots units, from senior generals to ordinary soldiers. They stipulate the daily activities of the army in the form of regulations, including the establishment of regular combat readiness, training, work, life order and other basic behavioral norms.

The Joint Regulations have been revised many times in history. The current Joint Regulations were issued in April 2018 by an order signed by Chairman of the Central Military Commission Xi Jinping and came into effect on May 1, 2018. In February 2025, the newly revised Joint Regulations were announced and will come into effect on April 1, 2025.

== See also ==
- Double Supports
- Three Rules of Discipline and Eight Points for Attention
