= The Sky Above the Liberated Zone =

"The Sky Above the Liberated Zone" (Chinese: 解放区的天; pinyin: jiěfàngqū de tiān "sky of liberated area") is a famous Chinese Communist Party revolutionary song. It was composed by Liu Xilin (Chinese: 刘西林) in 1943 to words by Ji Lumin (Chinese: 冀鲁民) after a folk song. It is one of the songs featured in the 1964 musical The East is Red. An edition of the song is included in the East is Red songbook.

The tune has also frequently been recorded in instrumental versions, such as Le Ciel Au-Dessus De La Zone Libérée arranged for piano by Chu Wang Hua, and played by pianist Jia Zhong.

Classic recordings of the number include the version by Bao Hui Qiao, and those by the China Broadcast Choir.

== Lyrics ==
Simplified	Traditional	Pinyin	English translation
解放区的天是明朗的天， 解放区的人民好喜欢， 民主政府爱人民呀， 共产党的恩情说不完。 呀呼嗨嗨伊咳呀嗨， 呀呼嗨呼嗨，呀呼嗨嗨嗨， 呀呼嗨嗨伊咳呀嗨。	解放區的天是明朗的天， 解放區的人民好喜歡， 民主政府愛人民呀， 共產黨的恩情說不完。 呀呼嗨嗨伊咳呀嗨， 呀呼嗨呼嗨，呀呼嗨嗨嗨， 呀呼嗨嗨伊咳呀嗨。	Jiěfàng qū de tiān shì mínglǎng de tiān, jiěfàng qū de rénmín hǎo xǐhuan, mínzhǔ zhèngfǔ àiren mín ya, gòngchǎndǎng de ēnqíng shuō bù wán. ya hū hāi hāi yī hāi ya hāi, ya hū hāi hū hāi ya hū hāi hāi hāi, ya hū hāi hāi yī hāi ya hāi.	Bright the sky in the Liberated Areas, And happy the people there, For the democratic government loves the people, The goodness of the Communist Party is boundless. Hurrah, hurrah, hurrah! Hurrah, hurrah, hurrah! Hurrah, hurrah, hurrah!
