= Battle on Shangganling Mountain =

Shangganling
- DVD front cover
- Traditional Chinese: 上甘嶺
- Simplified Chinese: 上甘岭
- Hanyu Pinyin: Shànggānlǐng
- Directed by: Lin Shan; Sha Meng
- Starring: Gao Baocheng; Xu Linge; Liu Yuru
- Release date: 1956
- Country: China
- Language: Mandarin

Shangganling (Chinese: 《上甘岭》; pinyin: Shànggānlǐng) is a 1956 Chinese war film, also translated as Battle of Shangganling and Battle on Shangganling Mountain. It depicts the Battle of Triangle Hill (Shangganling in Chinese) during the Korean War, an especially bloody battle that resulted in eventual Chinese victory.

The film follows a group of Chinese People's Volunteer Army soldiers who are holding Triangle Hill for several days against the U.S. Army and the Republic of Korea Army. Short of both food and water, they hold their ground until the relief troops arrive. The movie shows Chinese victory over the American invasion, and the People's Volunteer Army soldiers were shown as Chinese war heroes. The film's style and view of the battle have been contrasted with the 1959 American film Pork Chop Hill.

== The spirit of Shangganling ==
The Battle of Shangganling has become a symbol of Chinese "die for the sake of motherland" heroism, and also the symbol of fighting spirit of the Chinese military. Taking into account of the absolute superiority of American ground artillery power and air power, resulting in the People's Volunteer Army regaining their original positions against high American and South Korean casualties, the Chinese promote it as a military victory with emphasis on Chinese soldier's endurance and sacrifice.

== White House performance controversy ==
On 19 January 2011, pianist Lang Lang played the theme song of this movie at a White House state dinner for Chinese President Hu Jintao. The event generated controversies within both US and China, similar to the "anti-Soviet" music of composer Dmitri Shostakovich.

== See also ==
- "My Motherland", a popular song featured in the film
