= My Motherland =

Chinese patriotic song

"My Motherland" (simplified Chinese: 我的祖国; traditional Chinese: 我的祖國; pinyin: Wǒde Zǔguó) is a song written for the Chinese movie Shangganling (1956). Lyrics were written by Qiao Yu (乔羽). Music was composed by Liu Chi (刘炽). Both of them are well known for a number of songs since the 1950s. It remains a popular and famous patriotic song in mainland China, and the signature song for the famous operatic soprano Guo Lanying.

Original sound track.

== Lyrics and music ==
"My Motherland" was initially called "A Big River" (《一條大河》) by the author, in order to represent the hundreds of rivers that flow in China. The title was changed when it was published with the movie. The song is divided into 3 stanzas. Within each stanza, the soloist sings first before the chorus sings its refrain.

Although the song was written for a movie about Korean War in the 1950s, there is no explicit mention of the war at all. It describes a soldier (or anyone who is away from home) thinking about his home and his family.

The music for solo part has folk song style similar to those in northern China.

== Lyrics ==
Traditional Chinese	Simplified Chinese	Pinyin	English translation
1. （獨）; 一條大河波浪寬 風吹稻花香兩岸 我家就在岸上住 聽慣了艄公的號子 看慣了船上的白帆	1. （独）; 一条大河波浪宽 风吹稻花香两岸 我家就在岸上住 听惯了艄公的号子 看惯了船上的白帆	1. (Dú); Yītiáo dàhé bōlàng kuān Fēngchuī dào huāxiāng liǎng'àn Wǒjiā jiù zài ànshàng zhù Tīng guànle shāogōng de hào zi Kàn guànle chuánshàng de báifān	1. Solo; A great river flows, its waves wide Wind blows the scent of flowers to both shores My family lives on the shore I am used to hearing the punters' call And seeing the white sails on the boats
（合） 這是美麗的祖國 是我生長的地方 在這片遼闊的土地上 到處都有明媚的風光	（合） 这是美丽的祖国 是我生长的地方 在这片辽阔的土地上 到处都有明媚的风光	(Hé); Zhè shì měilì de zǔguó Shì wǒ shēngzhǎng de dìfāng Zài zhè piàn liáokuò de tǔdì shàng Dàochù dōu yǒu míngmèi de fēngguāng	Chorus; This is the beautiful Motherland; This is the place where I grew up On this expansive stretch of land Everywhere there is wonderful scenery to behold
2. （獨）; 姑娘好像花一樣 小伙心胸多寬廣 為了開闢新天地 喚醒了沉睡的高山 讓那河流改變了模樣	2. （独）; 姑娘好像花一样 小伙心胸多宽广 为了开辟新天地 唤醒了沉睡的高山 让那河流改变了模样	2. (Dú); Gūniang hǎoxiàng huā yīyàng Xiǎohuǒ xīnxiōng duō kuānguǎng Wèile kāipì xīntiāndì Huànxǐngle chénshuì de gāoshān Ràng nà héliú gǎibiànle múyàng	2. Solo; How flower-like are the young ladies How big and brave are the hearts of the young men In order to usher in a new era They've woken the sleeping mountains And changed the shape of the river
（合） 這是英雄的祖國 是我生長的地方 在這片古老的土地上 到處都有青春的力量	（合） 这是英雄的祖国 是我生长的地方 在这片古老的土地上 到处都有青春的力量	(Hé); Zhè shì yīngxióng de zǔguó Shì wǒ shēngzhǎng de dìfāng Zài zhè piàn gǔlǎo de tǔdì shàng Dàochù dōu yǒu qīngchūn de lìliàng	Chorus; This is the heroic Motherland; This is the place where I grew up On this stretch of ancient land There is youthful vigor everywhere
3. （獨）; 好山好水好地方 條條大路都寬暢 朋友來了有好酒 若是那豺狼來了 迎接它的有獵槍	3. （独）; 好山好水好地方 条条大路都宽畅 朋友来了有好酒 若是那豺狼来了 迎接它的有猎枪	3. (Dú); Hǎo shān hǎo shuǐ hǎo dìfāng Tiáo tiáo dàlù dōu kuānchàng Péngyǒu láile yǒu hào jiǔ Ruòshì nà cháiláng láile Yíngjiē tā de yǒu lièqiāng	3. Solo; Great mountains, great rivers, a great land Every road is broad and wide If friends come, there is fine wine But if the dholes and wolves come They shall be greeted with hunting guns
（合） 這是強大的祖國 是我生長的地方 在這片溫暖的土地上 到處都有和平的陽光	（合） 这是强大的祖国 是我生长的地方 在这片温暖的土地上 到处都有和平的阳光	(Hé); Zhè shì qiángdà de zǔguó Shì wǒ shēngzhǎng de dìfāng Zài zhè piàn wēnnuǎn de tǔdì shàng Dàochù dōu yǒu hépíng de yángguāng	Chorus; This is the mighty Motherland; This is the place where I grew up On this stretch of warm and friendly land There is peaceful sunshine everywhere

== Reception ==
The song received renewed international attention on January 19, 2011, when Lang Lang played "My Motherland" as President Barack Obama welcomed Hu Jintao at a White House state dinner (many famous Chinese celebrities, including Jackie Chan and Yo-Yo Ma attended, as well as some others.)

On Lang Lang's blog, he put pictures that performed at the White House and wrote that "I soloed 'My Motherland' which in the mind of the Chinese people is one of the most beautiful songs. Being able to play this song in front of many foreign guests, including the heads of state from around the world, that praises China, and seemingly serenading a strong China and its people in solidarity, I am deeply honored and proud. I would like to share that day in the White House."
