= Lang Lang =

Chinese pianist (born 1982)

- 郎朗
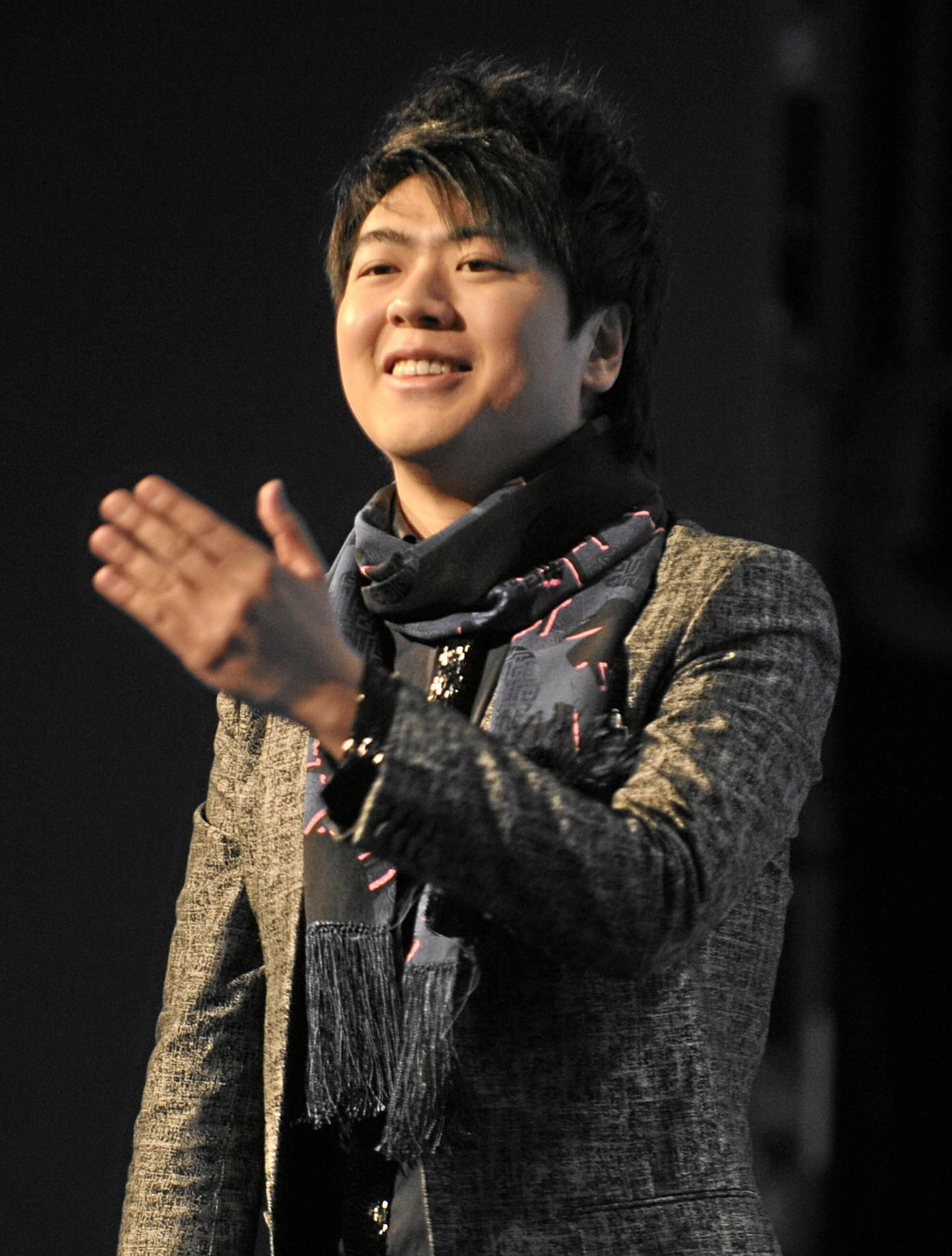
- Lang in 2010, after performing at the World Economic Forum annual meeting in Davos
- Born: 14 June 1982 (age 44); Shenyang, Liaoning, China
- Education: Central Conservatory of Music; Curtis Institute of Music
- Occupation: Musician
- Years active: 1993–present
- Spouse: Gina Redlinger (m. 2019)
- Children: 1
- Parent(s): Lang Guoren (郎國任); Zhou Xiulan (周秀蘭)
- Musical career
- Genre: Classical
- Instrument: Piano
- Labels: Deutsche Grammophon; Sony Classical; Telarc

YouTube information
- Channel: Lang Lang
- Years active: 2006–present
- Genre: Classical music
- Subscribers: 488 thousand
- Views: 118 million
- Last updated: 1 May 2026
- Website: www.langlangofficial.com

Lang Lang (Chinese: 郎朗; pinyin: Láng Lǎng; born 14 June 1982) is a Chinese classical pianist. He has performed with major orchestras around the world and appeared at many leading concert halls. Active since the 1990s, he was the first Chinese pianist to be engaged by the Berlin Philharmonic, the Vienna Philharmonic and many of the top American orchestras.

He was also a judge on the first two series of the British music competition television series The Piano.

== Early life and education ==
Lang Lang was born in Shenyang, China, in 1982, to a family of the Manchu Niohuru clan. His father Lang Guoren is a musician who plays the erhu. Both his father and mother, also a musician, were displaced to work on rice farms in the country during the Cultural Revolution, before Lang was born.

The Tom and Jerry episode The Cat Concerto, which features Franz Liszt's Hungarian Rhapsody No. 2, motivated two-year-old Lang to learn the piano. He started lessons with Zhu Yafen at age three, won first place at the Shenyang Piano Competition and performed his first public recital when he was five.

When Lang was nine, he was expelled from his piano tutor's studio for "lack of talent". Lang has stated that upon learning of this, his father flew into a rage and told Lang that he "shouldn't live any more", ordering him to jump off the balcony of their 11th floor family apartment. Another music teacher at his state school noticed Lang and asked him to play the second movement of Mozart's Piano Sonata No. 10, which reminded Lang of his love for the instrument. Lang later studied under Zhao Ping-Guo at Beijing's Central Conservatory of Music.

Lang won the Xinghai National Piano Competition in Beijing in 1993 and first prize for outstanding artistic performance at the International Competition for Young Pianists in Ettlingen, Germany, in 1994. In 1995, Lang played the Chopin études at the Beijing Concert Hall, won the International Tchaikovsky Competition for Young Musicians in Japan, and performed as soloist with the Moscow Philharmonic Orchestra. Fourteen-year-old Lang was a featured soloist for the China National Symphony's inaugural concert in September 1996, then General Secretary of the Chinese Communist Party Jiang Zemin met Lang after this performance.

Lang and his father moved to the United States in 1997, so Lang could pursue studies with Gary Graffman at the Curtis Institute of Music in Philadelphia.

== Career ==
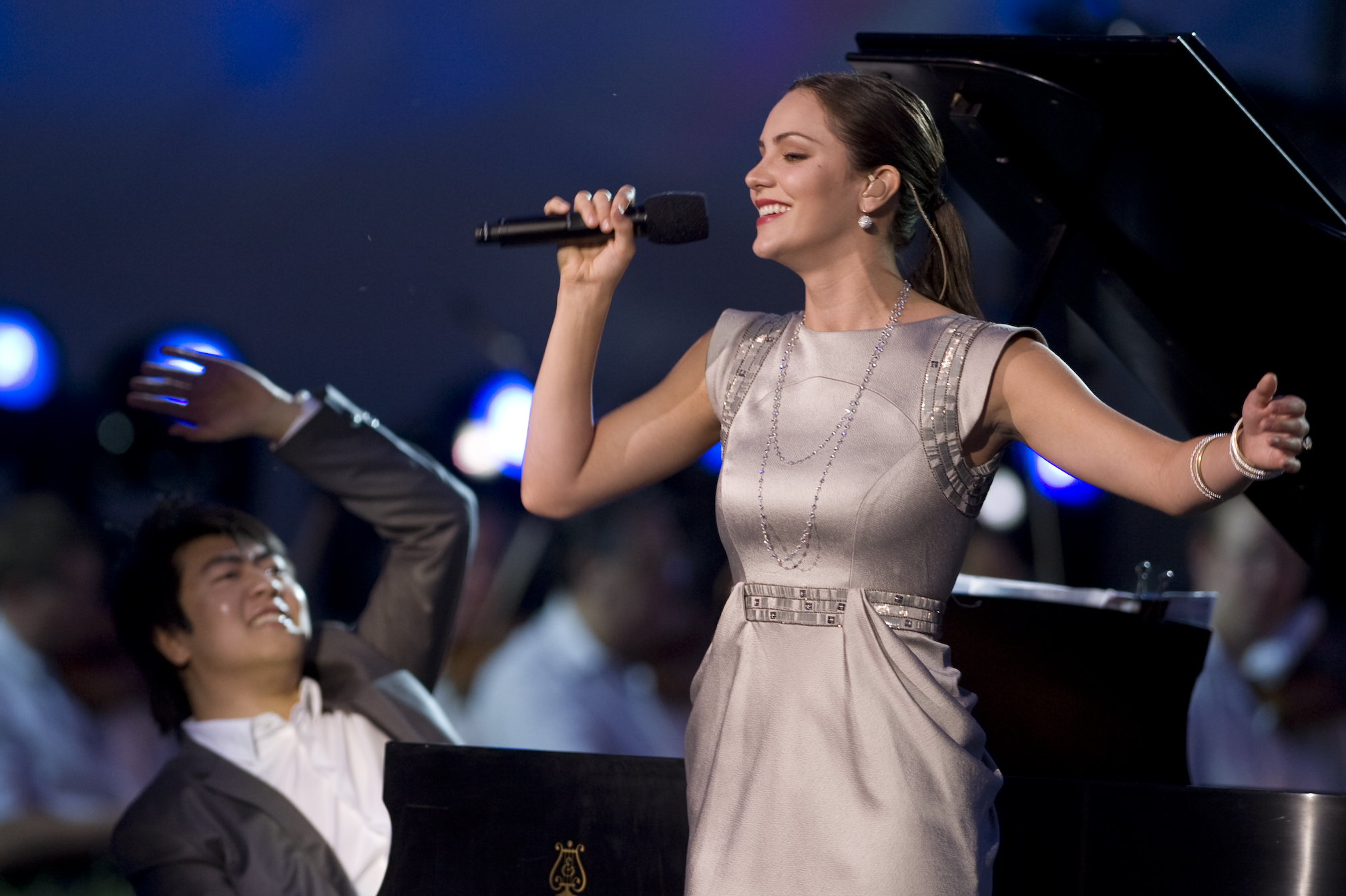
Lang and singer Katharine McPhee perform at the National Memorial Day Concert in Washington, D.C., United States, 24 May 2009.

Lang has been noted by musicians and critics around the world. The conductor Jahja Ling remarked: "Lang Lang is special because of his total mastery of the piano... He has the flair and great communicative power." National Public Radio's Morning Edition remarked: "Lang Lang has conquered the classical world with dazzling technique and charisma." It is often noted that Lang successfully straddles two worlds, classical prodigy and rock-like "superstar", a phenomenon summed up by The Times (London) journalist Emma Pomfret, who wrote, "I can think of no other classical artist who has achieved Lang Lang's broad appeal without dumbing down."

Lang's performance style was met with controversy when he gained wider recognition in the classical music scene in 1999. At that time, pianist Earl Wild called him "the J. Lo of the piano." Others have described him as immature, but admitted that his ability to "conquer crowds with youthful bravado" is phenomenal among classical musicians. His maturity in subsequent years was reported by The New Yorker: "The ebullient Lang Lang is maturing as an artist." In April 2009, when Time magazine included Lang in its list of the 100 most influential people, Herbie Hancock described his playing as "so sensitive and so deeply human", commenting: "You hear him play, and he never ceases to touch your heart."

In 2001, after a Carnegie Hall debut with Yuri Temirkanov, he traveled to Beijing with the Philadelphia Orchestra on a tour celebrating its 100th anniversary, during which he performed to an audience of 8,000 at the Great Hall of the People. The same year, he made his BBC Proms debut, prompting a music critic of the British newspaper The Times to write, "Lang Lang took a sold-out Royal Albert Hall by storm... This could well be history in the making". In 2003, he returned to the BBC Proms for the First Night concert with Leonard Slatkin. After his recital debut with the Berlin Philharmonic, the Berliner Zeitung wrote: "Lang Lang is a superb musical performer whose artistic touch is always in service of the music". In 2004, Lang was featured in Radio Television Hong Kong's TV documentary Outstanding Young Chinese Musicians. However, recent reviews have been mixed; Lang’s playing style has faced criticism from some for being overwrought or bombastic. The pianist has commented on the backlash: "You get many good reviews from the beginning", he says, "and then the critics start criticising you. It's strange. The things they liked you for first—unique, fresh—they say is great. And then later they say you're too fresh, too unique. But they're the same thing!"

Lang was the featured soloist on the Golden Globe-winning score of The Painted Veil and can be heard on the soundtrack of The Banquet. He has recorded for the Deutsche Grammophon and Telarc labels. His album of the first and fourth Beethoven piano concertos with the Orchestre de Paris and Christoph Eschenbach debuted at No. 1 on the Traditional Classical Billboard Chart. In 2008, he was the pianist on Mike Oldfield's 2008 album Music of the Spheres. In 2010, he signed with Sony for a reported $3 million. Metallica performed the song One alongside Lang at the 56th Annual Grammy Awards in 2014.

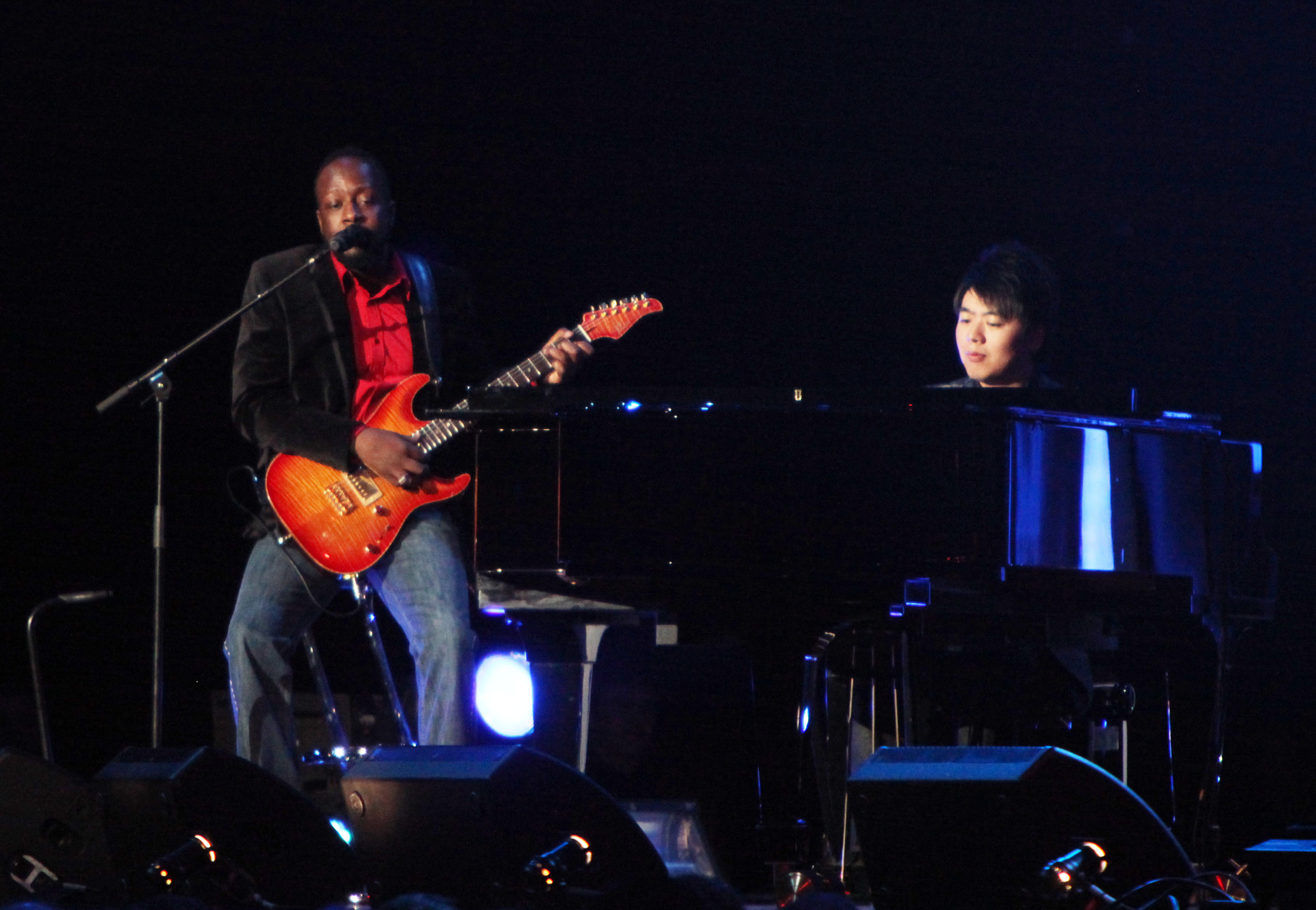
Lang and Wyclef Jean at The Nobel Peace Price Concert 2009

In December 2008, Lang partnered with Google and YouTube in the project YouTube Symphony Orchestra.

At the White House state dinner in honour of General Secretary of the Chinese Communist Party Hu Jintao's visit on 19 January 2011, one of the tunes Lang played was the song "My Motherland" from the movie Battle on Shangganling Mountain, a film about a Chinese victory in the Korean War. The song's lyrics include the line "We deal with wolves with guns", which in the film referred indirectly to the United States Army. Although the tune is popular and has lost much of its political and historical significance in China, the performance was interpreted by American conservatives as insulting the US.

In response to the controversy, Lang denied that he intended to insult the United States. He later released a statement stating that he "selected this song because it has been a favorite of mine since I was a child. It was selected for no other reason but for the beauty of its melody." White House spokesperson Tommy Vietor also responded by saying "My Motherland" is "widely known and popular in China for its melody. Lang played the song without lyrics or reference to any political theme... any suggestion that this was an insult to the United States is just flat wrong."

Lang has also recorded piano works for the video game Gran Turismo 5's soundtrack, mostly under the "Classical" subgenre. This included versions of Danny Boy, Scott Joplin's "The Entertainer", Beethoven's 8th Piano Sonata, and one of the game's intro pieces, the third movement from Prokofiev's 7th Piano Sonata.

Lang has played for UN Secretary General Kofi Annan, President Barack Obama, Queen Elizabeth II, Chinese leader Hu Jintao, President Horst Köhler, Prince Charles (now King Charles III), then Prime Minister Vladimir Putin, President Nicolas Sarkozy, and Polish President Lech Kaczyński.

In October 2016, Lang was invited to the Vatican to perform for Pope Francis.

He cancelled performances from March to July 2017, after injuring his left arm.

In 2023, Lang Lang became a judge on the Channel 4 television series The Piano, alongside singer Mika. He returned for the follow series in 2024, as well as a Christmas special, but departed afterwards to be replaced by American musician Jon Batiste.

== Select appearances ==
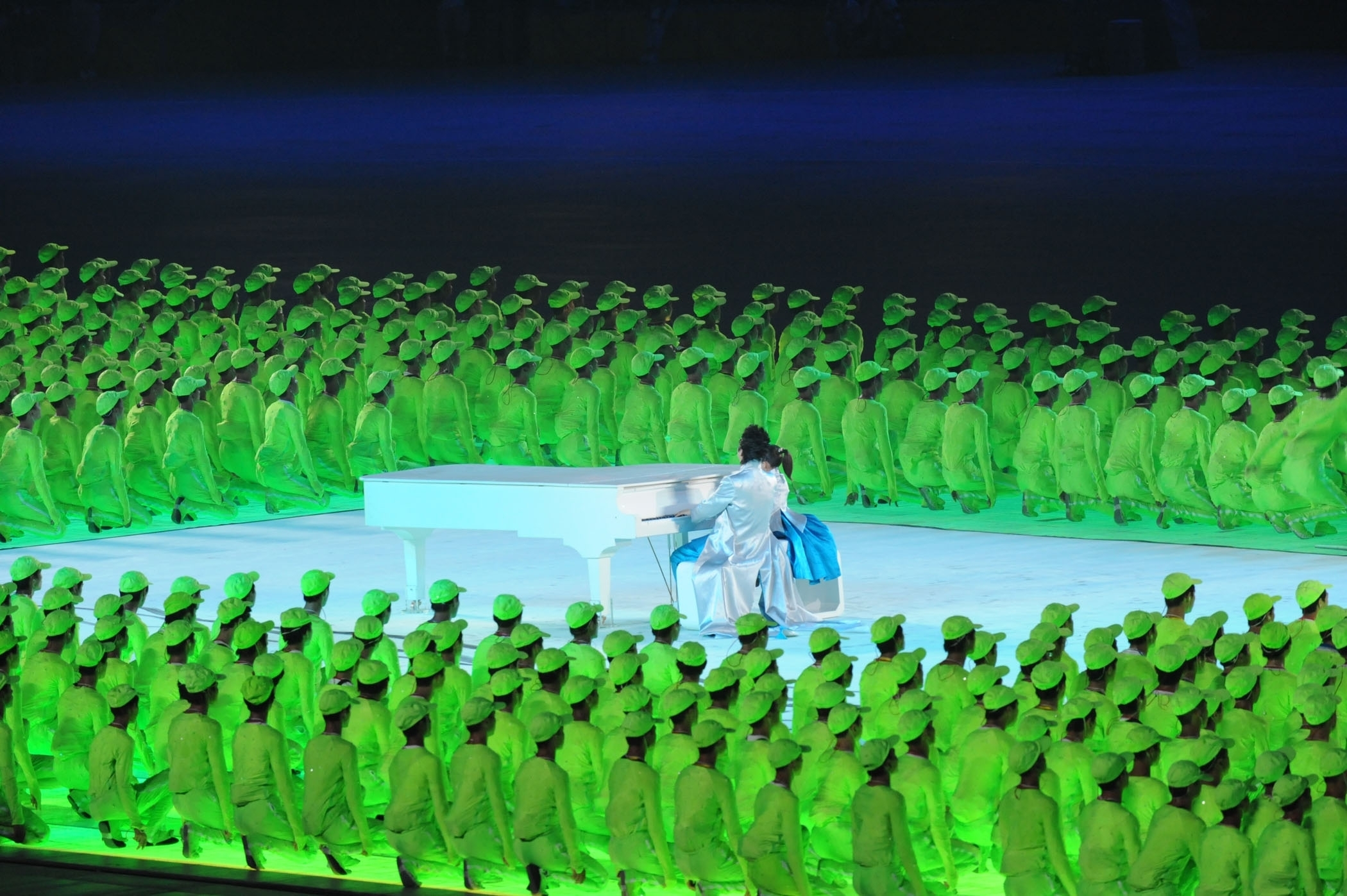
Lang performing at the Opening Ceremony of the 2008 Summer Olympics

Lang has performed at various open-air venues, including Central Park New York, Hollywood Bowl Los Angeles, the Ravinia Festival Chicago, Theaterplatz in Dresden, and Derby Park Hamburg.

In July 2007, he played at a concert from the Teatro del Silenzio, Lajatico, Italy, hosted by Andrea Bocelli. He performed "Io ci sarò" with Bocelli, and Liszt's "Hungarian Rhapsody". The performance is available on a DVD entitled Vivere Live in Tuscany.

In December 2007, Lang performed at the Nobel Prize concert in Stockholm. Collaborating with Seiji Ozawa, he appeared at the New Year's Eve gala opening for the National Center for the Performing Arts in Beijing. He also participated in the opening concert at Munich's Olympic Stadium with Mariss Jansons, marking the commencement of the 2006 FIFA World Cup, and, in a celebratory concert held the night before the last match of the 2008 Euro Cup finals, Lang played with the Vienna Philharmonic under Zubin Mehta in front of Schönbrunn Palace.

In 2008, an audience estimated at between one and four billion people saw Lang's performance in Beijing's opening ceremony for the 2008 Summer Olympics where he was promoted as a symbol of the youth and future of China. During these games, he was also featured on the German TV network ZDF and made several appearances on NBC's The Today Show Summer Olympics broadcasts. In the opening ceremony, he performed a melody from the Yellow River Cantata with five-year-old Li Muzi. Lang also collaborated with a German band, Schiller, to record "Time for Dreams", used to promote some coverage of the 2008 Olympics broadcast in Germany.

In February 2008, Lang and jazz pianist Herbie Hancock performed together at the 50th Annual Grammy Awards, playing George Gershwin's Rhapsody in Blue. The two were again brought in by United Airlines for the reintroduction of their "It's Time to Fly" advertising campaign with a series of new animated commercials aired during the 2008 Summer Olympics. In April 2008, he premiered Tan Dun's First Piano Concerto, subtitled "The Fire". Hancock and Lang continued to collaborate with a world tour in summer 2009. Lang played at the 2009 Nobel Peace Prize ceremony for US President Barack Obama and at the Nobel Peace Prize concert in Oslo the next day.

Lang has made numerous TV appearances including The Today Show, The Tonight Show with Jay Leno, Good Morning America, CBS Early Show, and 60 Minutes and was a judge on The Piano. He has featured in publications including The New Yorker, Esquire, Vogue (Germany), The Times, Financial Times, GQ, Die Welt, Reader's Digest, and People. Lang holds the title of the first Ambassador of the YouTube Symphony Orchestra.

In 2009, he performed at Carnegie Hall accompanied by Marc Yu, a 10-year-old pianist and musical child prodigy from Pasadena, California, who made his Carnegie Hall debut at the event.

Lang was featured in the award-winning German-Austrian documentary Pianomania, which was directed by Lilian Franck and Robert Cibis. The film premiered theatrically in North America, Asia and throughout Europe, and is a part of the Goethe-Institut catalogue.

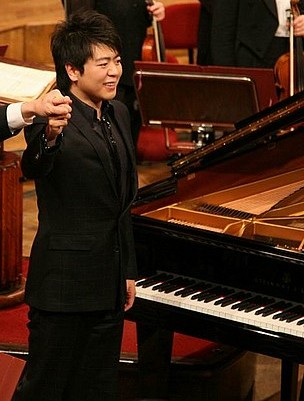
Lang at the opening of the 2010 Chopin Year in Warsaw

In 2010, he was featured at the Carnegie Hall's China Festival and performed with the New York Philharmonic on New Year's Eve at Avery Fisher Hall.

In 2011, Lang opened the Last Night of the Proms at the Royal Albert Hall performing with the BBC Symphony Orchestra. He played Liszt's 1st Piano Concerto and Chopin's Grande Polonaise Brillante.

In June 2012, he played Liszt's Hungarian Rhapsody No. 6 and Gershwin's Rhapsody in Blue at the Queen's Diamond Jubilee Concert at Buckingham Palace. In 2012, Lang gave a masterclass to a select few pianists at the Royal College of Music featuring Lara Ömeroğlu and Martin James Bartlett.

In January 2014, Lang collaborated with heavy metal band Metallica at the 56th Annual Grammy Awards, performing their iconic 1988 anti-war classic "One".

On 3 July 2014, Lang played at Byblos International Festival in Byblos, Lebanon.

On 19 September, he played with Korean artist PSY for opening ceremony of 2014 Asian Games in Incheon, South Korea.

On 18 October, Lang performed at the Red Velvet Ball with the St. Louis Symphony and David Robertson at Powell Hall.

On 8 February 2015, Lang played with Pharrell Williams and Hans Zimmer at the 57th Annual Grammy Awards, performing Pharrell's hit song "Happy".

On 30 April 2015, Lang performed at the Expo 2015 opening concert with Andrea Bocelli at Piazza del Duomo in Milan.

On 4 July 2015, Lang performed "Rhapsody in Blue" during "A Capitol Fourth", a U.S. Independence Day celebration televised from Washington, D.C.

On 24 September 2015, Lang performed the Edvard Grieg Piano Concerto in A minor, Op. 16 at the New York Philharmonic Opening Gala Concert at the David Geffen Hall with Alan Gilbert conducting.

In a cameo appearance in the 30 December 2015 episode of Mozart in the Jungle, Lang performed a version of Franz Liszt's "Hungarian Rhapsody No. 2".

On 19 August 2020, Lang told a meditative story about his audition for teacher Gary Graffman at the Curtis Institute of Music in Philadelphia.

On 25 September 2021, Lang performed at Global Citizen Live on the Great Lawn in Central Park, New York City. He also played piano for the Coldplay song, "Clocks" at the same festival.

On 30 September 2021, Lang performed at the opening ceremony of Expo 2020 in Dubai, UAE.

On 7 May 2023, Lang performed at the Coronation Concert, held in celebration of the coronation of King Charles III and Queen Camilla the day before. Lang played the piano for the song "Reflection", from Disney's 1998 animated film Mulan, accompanied by singer Nicole Scherzinger.

On 6 February 2026, Lang performed at the opening ceremony of the 2026 Winter Olympics in Milan, Italy.

== Books ==
Lang's autobiography, Journey of a Thousand Miles: My Story, co-authored by David Ritz and published by Random House in eight languages, was released in July 2008. Delacorte Press also released a version of the autobiography specifically for younger readers, entitled Playing with Flying Keys.

== Awards and outreach ==
Lang has achieved remarkable commercial success. His 2019 album Piano Book has exceeded 1.2 billion streams globally, topped classical charts in multiple countries, and become one of the most successful classical albums of the 21st century. On Spotify, he reportedly draws more than 4.25 million monthly listeners, placing him among the most streamed classical pianists. He has received many awards and made many television appearances. His Deutsche Grammophon recording of Beethoven Piano Concertos Nos. 1 and 4 with Christoph Eschenbach was nominated for a Grammy Award during the year of its release.

He appeared in Time magazine's 2009 list of the 100 Most Influential People in the World, and in Gramophone magazine's Hall of Fame in 2012. In 2008, the Recording Academy named him their Cultural Ambassador to China. He was also awarded the Crystal Award in Davos by the World Economic Forum in 2010, and he has been chosen as an official worldwide ambassador to the 2010 Shanghai Expo. Lang was appointed by the United Nations' Children's Fund (UNICEF) as an International Goodwill Ambassador in 2004. The Chinese government selected him as a vice-president of the All-China Youth Federation.

The Financial Times reported that Lang is "evangelical in his efforts to spread the popularity of classical music." In October 2008, he launched the Lang Lang International Music Foundation in New York with the support of the Grammys and UNICEF. In May 2009, Lang and his three chosen scholars from the foundation – Charlie Liu, Anna Larsen, and Derek Wang, who were between eight and 10 years old – performed together on The Oprah Winfrey Show.

In June 2011, Lang was engaged by Telefónica to make appearances concerning culture, technology, education and social commitment.

On 22 July 2012, Lang carried the London 2012 Olympic torch through Hornchurch on its Redbridge to Bexley leg. On 24 August 2012, he was awarded the Cross of Merit of the Federal Republic of Germany for his engagement in the Schleswig-Holstein Musik Festival.

On 27 January 2013, in Cannes, the Minister of Culture and Communication, Aurélie Filippetti, presented Lang with the insignia of Chevalier of the Order of Arts and Letters. In February, he received the Best International Music award at the 48th Goldene Kamera Awards in Berlin. In September, Lang won the Classic BRIT Awards International Artist of the Year. On 28 October, Lang was chosen by Secretary-General Ban Ki-moon to be a United Nations Messenger of Peace, a role he says is more important than his music because it can help improve the lives of children around the world through education. In November, Lang was given an honorary fellowship at St Peter's College, Oxford, presented to him by Mark Damazer CBE at a special ceremony. Besides, his Chopin Album on Sony Classical received the 2013 Echo Klassik Award.

In November 2014, Lang won the Spanish Premios Ondas award in Barcelona, Spain. Lang won the Bambi Award in the same month, one of Germany's highest media accolades, and he shared the award with the entertainer Helene Fischer, the tenor Jonas Kaufmann and Queen Mary of Denmark.

On 18 October 2015, Lang won the Echo Klassik Instrumentalist of the Year (Piano) award, and he also received a Special Award for the Lang Lang International Music Foundation. In November, Lang was named one of GQ Germany's "Men of the Year".

In 2017, the "Mission Mozart" project involving Lang and conductor Nikolaus Harnoncourt won the Echo Klassik award.

On 13 February 2019, Lang received a special award at the 2019 Victoires de la musique classique in recognition of his achievements over the past two decades.

On 10 April 2024, Lang was awarded a star on the Hollywood Walk of Fame.

Lang holds honorary doctorate degrees from the Royal College of Music, Birmingham City University, University of Leeds, Manhattan School of Music, New York University, University of Hong Kong, and Central Conservatory of Music.

On 19 May 2026, Lang was sworn in as an Honorary Fellow at Homerton College, Cambridge.

== Personal life ==
Lang lives in Paris, France, where he married German-Korean pianist Gina Alice Redlinger in June 2019. She gave birth to their first child in January 2021.
