= Zhang Jigang =

Chinese choreographer and lieutenant-general

Zhang Jigang 张继钢
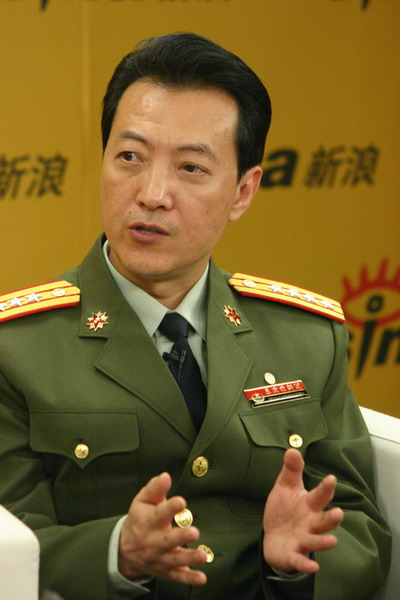
- Zhang Jigang at Sina.com, 2006
- Born: December 25, 1958 (age 67); Shanxi, China
- Spouse: Zhang Lamei
- Children: 1

Zhang Jigang (simplified Chinese: 张继钢; traditional Chinese: 張繼鋼; pinyin: Zhāng Jìgāng, pronounced [tʂáŋ tɕî káŋ]; born December 25, 1958) is an internationally acclaimed Chinese choreographer and lieutenant general in the People's Liberation Army. He was the former director of the Song and Dance Ensemble with the People's Liberation Army before being promoted in 2006. Zhang Jigang now holds the highest non-combat military officer rank in China.

He is the only choreographer to receive the crown title of "Century Star" in the country, and is responsible for the creation of more than 300 large-scale productions in over 60 countries.

== Early career ==
Zhang Jigang was born in the ancient Chinese city of Yuci located in the Shanxi Province. As a young child, he was influenced by Zhong Ziwu (Cultural Revolution Dance). He began formal dance training at the age of 12 in Taiyuan at the Song and Dance Ensemble of Shanxi Province. By the age of 17, he was working as an established choreographer for the Chinese government. In the 1980s he received the highest national dance award called Quan Guo Wu Dao Da Sai (Chinese: 全国舞蹈大赛). Zhang Jigang became the first resident of Shanxi Province to receive such an award, propelling his career to national stardom putting Shanxi Province in the entertainment spotlight for the first time. Shortly after, in 1988 he enrolled at the Beijing Dance Academy where he graduated with a degree in choreography. He would later return to university and finish with a Masters in Political Science.

== 1980s ==
Zhang truly began to establish himself as a leading choreographer during this period, although he was yet to obtain the level of international success he would experience a decade later. His works contained many traditional cultural Chinese dance influences throughout the decade, and were often categorized by heavy militaristic symbols.

=== Mother and Son (母与子) ===
Created by Zhang in 1986, it revolves around a mother and her criminal son. It was performed in Beijing, and was one of Zhang's first major works.

=== The Night of Yuanxiao Festival (元宵夜) ===
A comedic story created by Zhang Jigang revolving around a couple who visit the Yuanxiao Festival and lose each other in crowd. It quickly became a smash hit, and was franchised across China by dozens of provincial theatre companies.

=== Feelings of the Yellow River Girl (黄河儿女情) ===
A show developed by a number of choreographers.

== 1990s ==
In 1992, Zhang became a choreographer for the Art Troupe of the PLA's General Political Department (A prominent dance group in China)

=== Yellow Earth (黄土黄) ===
Received the 20th Century Classical Dance Award, and a national smash success. It also received the 3rd Taoli Award for outstanding dance production.

=== A Man Who Dances Yangge (一个扭秧歌的人) ===
Another production to receive the 20th Century Classical Dance Award. The story revolved around the passion of dance in China.

== 2000–present ==
Zhang Jigang has enjoyed international acclaim and success in his military career. He was promoted to the rank of Lt. General in 2006 and currently holds the highest military rank in China for any non-combat officer. Aside from receiving awards in Hollywood California, North Korea, Japan and Monaco, Zhang Jigang created a number of multimillion-dollar large-scale productions that subsequently toured America, Australia, Italy and Spain. He currently resides in Beijing, China with his wife Zhang Lamei.

=== Thousand Hand Bodhisattva (Guan Yin) (千手观音) ===
Zhang Jigang's most famous and influential production, the piece features 21 hearing-impaired dancers who form remarkable arm and hand positions by standing closely together in a straight line. Breathtaking images are created as the dancers perform perfectly synchronized movements. The show became a national treasure and an overwhelming domestic success. It was first performed internationally at the Kennedy Center in Washington, D.C. before former U.S. President Bill Clinton, senior White House staff, and other spectators. It was then showcased around the world in countries including Australia, Japan, North Korea, Egypt, Turkey, and Italy. In 2004, it was performed at the Closing Ceremony of the 2004 Summer Paralympics in Athens, Greece, as well as at the Miss World 2004 pageant held in Sanya, China. [citation needed] The primary filmed version was recorded during the 2005 Spring Festival Gala on CCTV. It subsequently spread across the internet through platforms such as Google Video and YouTube. As a result, hundreds of millions of viewers in China and around the world have watched the performance online.

=== Forbidden Fruit Under The Great Wall (一把酸枣) ===
Zhang Jigang's most recent production. The large scale show features a cast with some of China's most famous acrobatic and traditional dance stars. It revolves around the life of a young man who seeks his fortune in Shanxi during the Tang dynasty. Poison Dates includes a huge ensemble with over 200 dancers. It is franchised across China and has been received by soldout shows in over 100 cities including Beijing, Shanghai, Taiyuan and Hong Kong. In early 2007, the show toured Japan and in December 2007 travelled to Taiwan.

=== CCTV National Dance Competition, Season 4 (第四届CCTV电视舞蹈大奖赛) ===
Zhang Jigang was a returning celebrity judge on China's most popular dance idol show. The program could be compared to that of the Idol series or Dancelife, with contestants vying to win a coveted prize in ballet, hip-hop, Latin, folk and Chinese classical dance. It was broadcast nationally every night from April 19 - 28th 2007 at 7:30pm on CCTV 3. Season 4 received the highest domestic ratings for the series ever, with an estimated national audience over 200 million viewers per episode.

=== 2008 Beijing opening ceremonies ===
On August 8, 2008, Zhang Jigang co-directed and choreographed the 2008 Summer Olympics opening ceremony in Beijing, China. Hein Verbruggen, chairman of the IOC Coordination Commission for the XXIX Olympiad, called the ceremony "a grand, unprecedented success." The AFP called it "a spectacular opening ceremony." The BBC and The Times concurred by calling it a dazzling and spectacular show in Beijing.

=== The Road to Revival (复兴之路) ===
Zhang directed The Road to Revival, a 2009 film created for the celebration of the 60th anniversary of the PRC. Zhang conceived of the production as built around performance spaces that combined "performance art in the square" with "performance art on a stage".

== Awards ==
- 1986 Third Annual National Dance Competition 3rd Award
- 1986 National Folk Singing and Dance Competition 1st Place of the Grand Prize
- 1987 National Wen Hua Award
- 1990 Tao Li Award
- 1992 20th Century Classical Dance
- 2002 The Wing of Life, Best International Production, Japan
- 2002 April Spring International, Best Choreography, North Korea
- 2003 Hollywood Star Award, Best Director

== See also ==
- 2008 Summer Olympics
- Zhang Yimou
- Bodhisattva
