= Three Rules of Discipline and Eight Points for Attention =

1928 military doctrine of Mao Zedong

The Three Rules of Discipline and Eight Points for Attention (Chinese: 三大纪律八项注意; pinyin: Sān dà jìlǜ bā xiàng zhùyì) is a military doctrine that was issued in 1928 by Mao Zedong and his associates to the Chinese Red Army during the Chinese Civil War. The contents vary slightly in different versions. One of the major distinctions of the doctrine was its respect for the civilians during wartime. The following version is obtained from Stephen Uhalley in 1975.

== Statement ==
The three rules enjoined

- prompt obedience to orders,
- no confiscation of people's property,
- prompt delivery directly to authorities of all items confiscated from enemy.

The eight points were:

- Be polite when speaking
- Be honest when buying and selling
- Return all borrowed articles
- Pay compensation for everything damaged
- Do not hit or swear at others
- Do not damage crops
- Do not harass women
- Do not mistreat prisoners

=== Alternate ===
An alternative, more literal translation into English was presented by the People's Daily.

The Three Main Rules of Discipline:

- Obey orders in all your actions. (一切行动听指挥)
- Do not take a single needle or piece of thread from the masses. (不拿群众一针一线)
- Turn in everything captured. (一切缴获要归公)

The Eight Points for Attention:

- Speak politely. (说话和气)
- Pay fairly for what you buy. (买卖公平)
- Return everything you borrow. (借东西要还)
- Pay for anything you damage. (损坏东西要赔)
- Do not hit or swear at people. (不打人骂人)
- Do not damage crops. (不损坏庄稼)
- Do not take liberties with women. (不调戏妇女)
- Do not ill-treat captives. (不虐待俘虏)

== History ==
These injunctions were usually complied with and, according to historian Stephen Uhalley, came to make the Chinese Red Army a distinctive army in China and an exceptionally popular one. The attitude of the Three Rules and the Eight Points heavily contrasted with the Nationalist Kuomintang armies led by Chiang Kai-shek, who were fighting the Chinese Red Army in the Chinese Civil War. For example, Nationalist armies tended to board in civilian houses without permission, tended to be rude and disrespectful towards civilians, or sometimes even confiscated material from the peasants in order to gain supplies. The Chinese Red Army however, under the Three Points of Discipline and Eight Points of Attention requested permission to take supplies and to board at houses instead, and any confiscation of peasant property were exceptions and violators were promptly punished. For example, Red Army soldiers would be shot on the spot if they were found looting peasant homes.

Many impressed villagers gave supplies and shelter to the Red Army voluntarily, greatly helping their war efforts. Eventually, many villagers and their sons and daughters joined the Red Army, providing the Red Army with sufficient manpower to combat the Japanese and Kuomintang.

It was common after a confiscation of items from warlords that the items would be redistributed among the people, in addition to supplying the Chinese Red Army. As a result, the peasants tended to spread disinformation to the Kuomintang when they arrived to pursue the Chinese Red Army, while showing the Chinese Red Army hospitality whenever they arrived at villages. This invariably resulted in attrition of the Kuomintang forces.

This contrasting doctrine in comparison with the Kuomintang inevitably became one of the major reasons for winning most of the Chinese people's support, and thus the victory of the Chinese Red Army over the Kuomintang in 1949. The people's support for the Red Army proved to be more important than the raw manpower that Kuomintang initially enjoyed.

The doctrine was turned into a song format, which used a melody that was originally composed for the Qing army as a training song, called "大帥練兵歌" (roughly translating to "The Marshal's Training Song"). The tune was then rewritten by Yuan Shikai, and became the training song of the Beiyang Army, also having been used by Zhang Zuolin. The same melody is played in Taiwan, although with differently lyrics due to its history of being rewritten for varying purposes.

== See also ==
- Military anthem of China
- Common Regulations of the People's Liberation Army
- Winning hearts and minds
- New Life Movement, a similar national disciplinary movement enacted under the Republic of China
