= To the Rear of the Enemy =

Sheet music for To the Rear of the Enemy, written in jianpu notation

"To the Rear of the Enemy" (simplified Chinese: 到敌人后方去; traditional Chinese: 到敵人後方去; pinyin: Dào dírén hòufāng qù), also translated as "To Go Behind Enemy Lines", is a Chinese patriotic song written in 1938 by Zhao Qihai. The song was a popular melody during the Second Sino-Japanese War, where it was used by numerous guerilla groups and gained popularity as a resistance song against the Japanese.

== History ==
The song was written by Zhao Qihai and composed by Xing Xinghai in September 1938. During the Second Sino-Japanese War in 1937, Qihai was a student at Beijing Normal University, and, alongside a number of other progressives and students, founded the Peiping Students' Exile Theatre Group to produce anti-Japanese music and propaganda. Similarly, Xinghai was a travelling musician, touring China with communist sympathisers in an attempt to rally support against the Japanese. In early 1938, the two met in Wuhan, and began producing music together.

During this time, Qihai became increasingly influenced by the methodologies of guerilla warfare in the lyrics of his music, in particular the 1938 compilation On Protracted War, which stressed the use of small raids against the Japanese from behind enemy lines. In September 1938, Qihai and Xinghai wrote a series of musical works inspired by these communist guerrilla tactics, of which To the Rear of the Enemy became the most popular. The song was used extensively in Chinese propaganda works both during and after the war, and became a popular revolutionary song.

=== Lyrics ===
Simplified Chinese	Traditional Chinese	Pinyin	English translation
副歌 到敌人后方去， 把鬼子赶出境！ 到敌人后方去， 把鬼子赶出境！ 不怕雨，不怕风， 包后路，出奇兵， 今天攻下来一个村， 明天夺回来一座城， 叫鬼子顾西不顾东， 叫鬼子军力不集中。 副歌 两路夹攻才能打得赢， 两路夹攻才能打得胜！ 副歌 不论西，不论东， 从北平，到南京， 到处有我们游击队， 到处有我们好弟兄， 看日本军阀有什么用 ， 看日本军阀有什么用？ 副歌 我们的旗帜插遍了东三省 ， 我们的旗帜插遍了黄河东。 副歌	副歌 到敵人後方去， 把鬼子趕出境！ 到敵人後方去， 把鬼子趕出境！ 不怕雨，不怕風， 包後路，出奇兵， 今天攻下來一個村， 明天奪回來一座城， 叫鬼子顧西不顧東， 叫鬼子軍力不集中。 副歌 兩路夾攻才能打得贏， 兩路夾攻才能打得勝！ 副歌 不論西，不論東， 從北平，到南京， 到處有我們游擊隊， 到處有我們好弟兄， 看日本軍閥有什麼用， 看日本軍閥有什麼用？ 副歌 我們的旗幟插遍了東三省， 我們的旗幟插遍了黃河東。 副歌	Fù gē dào dí rén hòu fāng qù， bǎ guǐ zǐ gǎn chū jìng ！ dào dí rén hòu fāng qù ， bǎ guǐ zǐ gǎn chū jìng ！ bù pà yǔ ， bù pà fēng ， bāo hòu lù ， chū qí bīng， jīn tiān gōng xià lái yī gè cūn， míng tiān duó huí lái yī zuò chéng， jiào guǐ zǐ gù xī bù gù dōng， jiào guǐ zǐ jūn lì bù jí zhōng。 Fù gē liǎng lù jiā gōng cái néng dǎ dé yíng ， liǎng lù jiā gōng cái néng dǎ dé shèng ！ Fù gē bù lùn xī ， bù lùn dōng ， cóng běi píng ， dào nán jīng ， dào chǔ yǒu wǒ mén yóu jī duì ， dào chǔ yǒu wǒ mén hǎo dì xiōng ， kàn rì běn jūn fá yǒu shí me yòng ， kàn rì běn jūn fá yǒu shí me yòng ？ Fù gē wǒ mén dí qí zhì chā biàn liǎo dōng sān shěng ， wǒ mén dí qí zhì chā biàn liǎo huáng hé dōng 。 Fù gē	Refrain: Go behind the enemy, Flush out the devil! Go behind the enemy, Flush out the devil! Not afraid of rain, not afraid of the wind, After the package, a surprise soldier, Take down a village today, To take back a city tomorrow, Devil Gu Xie Gudong, The devil army is not concentrated. Refrain Two-prong attack can win. Two-prong attack can win! Refrain Regardless if West, regardless if East, From Beiping to Nanjing, There are our guerrillas everywhere, There are our good brothers everywhere. What is the use of Japanese warlords? What is the use of Japanese warlords? Refrain Our banner was inserted throughout the three provinces of East China . Our banner was inserted in the east of the Yellow River. Refrain

== See also ==
- Maoism
- Mao Zedong
- The East Is Red (song)
- Cultural Revolution
- Ode to the Motherland
- Sailing the Seas Depends on the Helmsman
