= Wang Zhongqi =

Chinese engineer (1932–2022)

- 王仲奇
- Born: 29 June 1932; Tang County, Hebei, China
- Died: 25 December 2022 (aged 90); Harbin, Heilongjiang, China
- Education: Harbin Institute of Technology; Moscow Power Engineering Institute
- Scientific career
- Fields: Thermal turbomachinery
- Workplaces: Harbin Institute of Technology; Northeast China Municipal Engineering Design Institute

Wang Zhongqi (Chinese: 王仲奇; pinyin: Wáng Zhòngqí; 29 June 1932 – 25 December 2022) was a Chinese engineer who was a professor at Harbin Institute of Technology, and an academician of the Chinese Academy of Engineering.

== Biography ==
Wang was born in Tang County, Hebei, on 29 June 1932. His uncle Wang Heshou was a Communist politician. His elder sister Wang Kun was an opera singer. He attended Shanxi-Chahar-Hebei Frontline United Middle School (now Beijing 101 Middle School). In 1952, he entered Harbin Institute of Technology, where he graduated in 1956. In October 1960, he was sent to study at Moscow Power Engineering Institute at the expense of the Communist government, obtaining his vice-doctorate in October 1962.

Wang began his academic career at Harbin Institute of Technology in 1957. At the institute, he eventually became professor in 1999. He also served as chief engineer at the Northeast China Municipal Engineering Design Institute between January 1985 and December 1998.

On 25 December 2022, Wang died in Harbin, Heilongjiang, at the age of 90.

== Honours and awards ==
- 1994 State Natural Science Award (Second Class)
- 1997 Member of the Chinese Academy of Engineering (CAE)
- 2001 State Science and Technology Progress Award (Second Class)

== Family ==
His sister Wang Kun was a Chinese opera singer in revolutionary repertoire.
