= Tseten Dolma =

Tibetan soprano

Delegate to the National People's Congress (6th)
- In office 1983–1988
- Chairman: Peng Zhen

Member of the Standing Committee of the National People's Congress (5th)
- In office 1978–1983
- Chairman: Ye Jianying

Member of the Chinese People's Political Consultative Conference (4th, 7th, 8th, 9th)
- In office January 1965 – March 1978
- Chairman: Zhou Enlai
- In office April 1988 – March 2003
- Chairman: Li Xiannian; Li Ruihuan

Personal details
- Born: 1 August 1937 (age 89) Xigaze, Tibet (modern day People's Republic of China)
- Party: Chinese Communist Party
- Spouse: Namgyal Dorje (m. 1957)
- Children: 2 (son and daughter)
- Occupation: Singer

Tseten Dolma (Tibetan: ཚེ་བརྟན་སྒྲོལ་མ།, Wylie: tshe brtan sgrol ma, ZWPY: Cêdain Zhoima, Lhasa dialect: [t͡sʰe˥˥.tɛ̃.ɖ~ɖʐøː˩˨.ma]; Chinese: 才旦卓玛; pinyin: Cáidàn Zhuōmǎ) is a Tibetan soprano. Tseten was influenced by Tibetan folk music from a very young age, and first performed on stage in 1956. She is known for starring in the 1965 musical epic The East Is Red. She has held senior posts in China's official arts organisations and in the Chinese People's Political Consultative Conference. Chinese state media present her as a symbol of the end of serfdom in Tibet, while Tibetan critics, including writers in exile, have described her songs as state propaganda.

== Early life and education ==
Tseten Dolma was born in 1 August 1937 in Shigatse. Chinese state media describe her as having been born into a family of serfs, and in a 2021 interview with China Daily, she recalled hunger, constant work and beatings in her childhood. At about the age of 20, she joined an art ensemble of the People's Liberation Army in Shigatse. In 1958, she was sent to a school for Tibetans in Shaanxi province, and that year she entered a class for ethnic minority students at the Shanghai Conservatory of Music, when she could barely speak Chinese. There she studied under the vocal teacher Wang Pinsu. The singer Wang Kun also mentored her from the 1950s, advising her on pronunciation and on preserving a Tibetan vocal style. Because of her busy performing schedule, she did not graduate until 1965.

== Career ==
=== Rise to fame ===
In 1959, she sang the theme song of a documentary film about Tibet, "Emancipated Serfs Sing", which became her signature song. In 1963, while still a student, she performed "Sing a Folk Song to the Party" at the Shanghai Spring International Music Festival. She learned to sing the song in Mandarin, which took her about two months. The song, composed by Zhu Jian'er, who also coached her, became associated with the model soldier Lei Feng. Broadcast on radio, her performance made the song a nationwide hit and made her famous. In 1964, she took part in the musical epic The East Is Red at the Great Hall of the People in Beijing.

After graduating, Tseten Dolma returned to Tibet, where she toured pastures and villages, singing for local people. According to China Daily, Premier Zhou Enlai had told her that "Tibet needs people like you". In 1972, she recorded "On the Golden Mountain of Beijing", which became widely known. The South China Morning Post later described the song as epitomising the official propaganda that once shaped mainland Chinese understanding of Tibet, presenting it as a primitive land freed from serfdom by the Communist Party.

=== Later career ===
Tseten Dolma became chair of the Tibet Federation of Literary and Art Circles, a vice chair of the China Federation of Literary and Art Circles and a vice chair of the Chinese Musicians Association. She was a member of the 4th, 7th, 8th and 9th National Committees of the Chinese People's Political Consultative Conference, and a vice chair of its Tibet Autonomous Region committee. In 1989, she received the China Golden Record Award. In 1993, she promoted the creation of the Mount Qomolangma Literature and Art Foundation in Tibet. She has performed abroad in dozens of countries, including the United States, the United Kingdom, Germany, Japan and Austria.

In later years, Tseten Dolma often served as a judge in singing competitions, and in the 2008 CCTV New Year's Gala, she sang a Tibetan song from the 1960s with a young pop singer. On 21 June 2008, she was the final torchbearer of the Olympic torch relay in Lhasa. The relay's passage through Lhasa, three months after the 2008 Tibetan unrest, was opposed by Tibetans in exile, who held a "No Torch in Tibet" rally in Dharamshala against it. In May 2021, at the age of 84, she received a special honour award at the 37th Shanghai Spring International Music Festival and sang "Sing a Folk Song to the Party" at its closing ceremony. In the 2021 interview, she said that "without liberation, it would not have been possible for us to have today's happy life".

== Reception ==
In China, Tseten Dolma is celebrated in official media as a singer whose life embodies the end of serfdom in Tibet, and the baritone Yang Xiaoyong called her "an idol to us". Tibetan critics have taken a different view, and the Tibetan scholar Lama Jabb, writing in the Revue d'Etudes Tibétaines, cites her songs in praise of Mao and the Communist revolution as examples of the early phase of modern Tibetan music, when it served Chinese state propaganda in the 1960s and 1970s. The Dharamshala-based Tibetan poet Bhuchung D. Sonam, writing for the diaspora Tibetan blog Lhakar Diaries in 2011, called her a "veteran Communist nightingale" and argued that the state promoted such "patriotic" singers while imprisoning Tibetan artists who did not support its message.

Tibetan writer Tsering Woeser, in essays translated into English by the website High Peaks Pure Earth, described Tseten Dolma as a "government sponsored" singer who had transformed herself from "a liberated serf" into an official. In a 2010 essay written for Radio Free Asia, Woeser reported that propaganda vehicles in Lhasa were repeatedly broadcasting her songs from loudspeakers, and she linked them to the politics of the Cultural Revolution. The translators noted that Tibetan bloggers had also criticised both her and her music.

== Personal life ==
In 1957, after about a year of courtship, Tseten Dolma married Namgyal Dorje, who was six years her senior, had also come from the People's Liberation Army's 18th Army and later worked in public security. While she studied and toured, he took on most of the housework and childcare, and in her later years she spoke of caring for him during his poor health. The couple had a daughter and a son. Their daughter, who had been in poor health since childhood, died suddenly after complaining of a severe headache, and friends later told Tseten Dolma that better medical care might have saved her. Their son has worked in construction in Tibet and has a son of his own.

== Notable works ==
Tsetsun Dolma is famous for the following songs:

- On the Golden Mountain of Beijing (《在北京的金山上》)
- Emancipated Serfs Sing Proudly (《翻身农奴把歌唱》)
- Flying goose (《远飞的大雁》)
- Heart Song (《唱起心中的歌》)
- Happy Songs (《幸福的歌声》)
- Spring Wind Waves in My Heart (《春风在心中荡漾》)
- Lhobas are Flying High (《珞巴展翅飞翔》)
