= Revolutionary song =

Song that advocates or praises a revolution

Revolutionary songs are political songs that advocate or praise revolutions. They are used to boost morale and spread political propaganda or agitation. Amongst the most well-known revolutionary songs are "La Marseillaise" and "The Internationale". Many protest songs can be considered revolutionary – or later become canonized as revolutionary songs following a successful revolution. On the other hand, once a revolution is established, some of the aspects of protest song may be considered counter-revolutionary.

Revolutionary songs are a notable part of propaganda. The singing of such songs is often considered as a demonstrative or revolutionary action. Such songs have been known to lend solidarity to disjointed political communities. Some revolutionary songs have appeared spontaneously; others have been written by notable authors, such as Bertolt Brecht. Revolutionary songs are frequently targeted at certain governments.

== By country ==
Music was part of the cultural support of the earliest revolutions, and institutionalized as a genre of socialist or workers' music in countries including the Soviet Union, its former Eastern European satellites, China, Vietnam, Cuba and North Korea, as well as less permanent revolutionary movements in other countries.

=== French Revolution ===
During the French Revolution, notable songs, beyond "La Marseillaise", included "Chant du départ", "Carmagnole", "Ça Ira" (1790), "Allons Français au Champs de Mars" (1790), "L'aristocratie en déroute" (1790), "Aux bons citoyens" (1790), "Le bonnet de la liberté", and many more.

=== American Revolution ===
Songs during the American Revolutionary War with revolutionary lyrics and propaganda purposes include songs such as "Dying Redcoat", "Free America", "Poor Old Tory", and "Jefferson and Liberty".

=== Greek Revolution ===
The successful Greek War of Independence between 1821 and 1832, generated not only revolutionary songs in Greece, but wide artistic and musical support from other western nations.

=== Revolutions of 1848 ===
The Revolutions of 1848 in Europe generated a wide range of revolutionary, nationalist and patriotic popular song. This tapped into earlier support for the Napoleonic revolutions. The current Romanian national anthem "Deșteaptă-te, române!" is a revolutionary song of 1848.

=== Russian Revolution ===
Revolutionary songs were used by the Bolsheviks during the Russian Revolution, with "The Internationale" becoming the national anthem of the USSR later on.

=== Spanish Civil War ===
Many revolutionary songs appeared during the Spanish Civil War and subsequent social revolution, especially amongst members of the anarcho-syndicalist trade union, the Confederación Nacional del Trabajo. The most famous of these, "A las Barricadas", remains popular for anarchist militants to this day.

=== Europe ===
In post-World War II Europe, revolutionary songs were taught in schools and sung at celebrations and official functions.

=== China ===
Revolutionary songs were a prominent part of the popular culture of the People's Republic of China during the 1950s, 1960s, and 1970s, and especially during the Cultural Revolution. One of the more popular Chinese revolutionary songs was "Nanniwan", a 1943 song lauding the exploits of the Eighth Route Army in the titular gorge in Shaanxi province near the revolutionary base of Yan'an. Revolutionary songs of Communist China often served to glorify the Chinese Communist Revolution and to present an image of unity amongst China's 56 ethnic groups and its various regions. Songs such as "The Sky Above the Liberated Zone" (praising the Chinese Communist Party (CCP) and romanticizing life in the CCP-held liberated zones during the wars against Japan and the Kuomintang) and "Osmanthus Flowers Blooming Everywhere in August", a Chinese Red Army folk song from the Sichuan province, are among the best-known revolutionary songs from the wartime and Maoist periods in China.

=== Vietnam ===
Nhạc đỏ, "Red Music," is the common name of the revolutionary music (nhạc cách mạng) genre in Vietnam. Composers during the struggle against the French include Đinh Nhu then songwriters of Vietnamese popular music such as Văn Cao.

=== Cuba and Latin America ===
Cuba's national anthem "La Bayamesa" ("El Himno de Bayamo") dates to 1868, but many new songs were generated by the revolution. The key focus is on the rural people. "Hasta Siempre" (1965) was written when Che Guevara departed Cuba to spread the revolution in Africa. Another well known Latin American song, "El pueblo unido jamás será vencido" (1973), is not a revolutionary song, but a Chilean protest song in support of Salvador Allende. Cuban government sponsored revolutionary Nueva trova is often similar to Nueva canción, Latin American protest songs.

=== Iranian Revolution ===
Following the Iranian Revolution musicians were obliged to create music different from the pre-revolutionary music both in terms of rhythm and content. Iranian revolutionary songs (Persian: سرودهای انقلاب اسلامی) are epic ballads, composed during the Islamic Revolution in Iran in support of the revolution and in opposition to the Pahlavi dynasty. Before the success of the revolution, these chants were made by various political supporters – many of them recorded on cassette tapes in underground and home studios. On the anniversary of the revolution, many of the songs were broadcast by Iranian state television. In schools the songs have been sung by students as part of the celebrations Fajr for decades.

== Musical genres ==
Some revolutionary songs intentionally mimic folk (children's) songs to make them palatable in non-political settings. An example of this type of song is a lullaby from Hungary (tentative translation follows), which starts off as a lullaby but shifts into more direct propaganda toward the end:

The bunch of little bears happily sleeping
And the pool sleeps on a soft pillow
The swing sleeps too, and the night will be their good blanket
Dream, my little one, soft dream flies
It flies to your eyes
Be silent, little baby
Our dreams were hushed away by the grim despotism
And only our hunger sung our song.

Another example is "Tomorrow Belongs to Me", which is performed by a young man in the movie Cabaret. It starts off as a sweet folk song about nature, and then it becomes apparent that the young man is a member of the Hitler Youth. Soon, the song changes into a marching song, and the lyrics became a fascist propaganda about "rising up."

Another kind of revolutionary songs are folk songs that become popular or change lyrics during revolutions or civil wars. Typical examples, the Mexican song "La Cucaracha" and the Russian song "Yablochko" (Little Apple) have humorous (often darkly humorous) lyrics that come in easily remembered stanzas and vary highly from singer to singer.

== Psychology ==
The effect of some revolutionary songs has been compared to a coordinated attack, inspiring individuals to merge themselves into a cohesive body.

== See also ==
- Protest song
- Red song
- List of socialist songs
