= Political music in China =

Political music in China (政治歌曲) consists of Patriotic Music (爱国歌曲) and Revolutionary Music (革命歌曲). It is an ideological music with political or nationalistic content, sometimes taking the form of a modernized Chinese traditional music written or adapted for some form of grand presentation with an orchestra. It was created in the early to mid-20th century, become the dominant genre of music after the Chinese Communist Revolution, and until the 1980s was the main form of music broadcast on radio and television in the People's Republic of China.

== Characteristics ==
Political music may be practically viewed at the political and ideology level. There are basically two ends of the spectrum.

The light end is the typical "Patriotic Music". It is usually performed by some collection of instrument or orchestra. It is equivalent to national anthems performed in other countries, perhaps taken more seriously by the Chinese government. The extreme end is termed "Revolutionary Music".

== History ==
=== Origin ===
After the fall of the Qing Dynasty, the New Culture Movement was initiated to promote a new national culture, including a new national music guoyue, and greater patriotism. Identity and national pride became important during the Second Sino-Japanese War and the Chinese Civil War throughout the 1930s. A left-wing music movement to promote music with anti-Imperialist and anti-feudal content called New Music (新音乐) began in the 1930s.

=== Birth of Revolutionary songs (1921–1970s) ===
The Communist Party began spreading songs among the people as early as 1921, when it was first established. One example is the predecessor to the Chinese revolutionary song ‘The East Is Red’—the folk tune known as White Horse Tune.

Beginning in the middle of 1958, the new folk song movement sought to compile folk songs and poetry. Among the major compendiums of these folk works was Red Flag Ballads by Guo Moruo and Zhou Yang, which presented the works of amateur poets anonymously as part of an effort to develop the figure of the mass writer in communist art and literature. The volume was one of the major artistic works of the Great Leap Forward. The most famous songs of the movement include I Have Come.

The red songs (红色歌曲) were presented differently from the usual national anthems, since the government made a genuine effort to upgrade the music for a political cause. An example is Lin Biao in 1964 promoting that "all Chinese were urged to learn from the People's Liberation Army", who were taught 11 revolutionary songs. For the musicians of the era, they were expected to model their work after the army's musical organization.

The 1964 music and dance epic The East is Red premiered on 2 October 1964 in Beijing. It is among the early cultural works which responded to Mao Zedong's call to prevent capitalist restoration in China. Other model operas influenced by this theme include The Song of the Longjiang River and The Seaport.

"Quotation songs", in which Mao Zedong's quotations were set to music, were particularly popular during the early years of the Cultural Revolution. Composer Li Jiefu (李劫夫, 1913-1976) first published quotation songs in People's Daily in September 1966 and they were promoted thereafter as a means for studying Quotations from Chairman Mao Zedong.

=== Revolutionary opera (1960s–1970s) ===
Jiang Qing was the main advocate of the revolutionary opera, and during the cultural revolution, only certain approved work could be performed.

Revolutionary operas were described as one of the newborn socialist things.

=== Reform era ===
The 1984 musical film The Song of the Chinese Revolution revises the narrative from its model The East is Red to include the roles of previously omitted revolutionary leaders and with greater emphasis on personal experiences, such as the pathos of the sacrifices made by women and children.

=== Mao nostalgia period (1990s) ===
As recent as 1991, anthems to Mao Zedong were updated into disco-like arrangements released in Shanghai by the China Record Company. The album titled "The Red Sun" (红太阳) became an instant best seller. For nostalgia, social, patriotic or entertainment purposes, there are many reasons why the genre have leaned so close to commercial music in the past.

=== Post-2000 ===
In 2004, there was a major revival of The East is Red to commemorate the 55th anniversary of the PRC's founding. It continues to be a popular musical work.

Bo Xilai made the singing of red songs an important aspect of his promotion of red culture through the Chongqing model. The campaign of singing red songs was intended to counter the influences of consumerism and commercialism. By the end of 2010, Chongqing had organized 155,000 events for the singing of red songs.

== Style ==
=== Patriotic Songs ===
Ensembles performing patriotic political songs range from chamber groups to quite large orchestras or a concert band which are led by a conductor. Orchestral patriotic music compositions are often arranged in concerto-like form, for solo instrument and orchestra, and often incorporate some use of Western harmony.

Usually it combines traditional instruments with western ones. Like in The East is Red, melodies of traditional instruments like erhu and sheng are combined with western ones such as violin and trumpets.

=== Revolutionary songs ===
Any given patriotic song can be performed for a revolutionary cause. Sometimes compositions are done to reflect a legacy. An example is compositions by Zhang Guangtian's (张广天) in 1993 idolizing the Cultural Revolution. The lyrics did get censored by the government to some degree for being too extreme, demonstrating how far the lyrics can go.

Sample translated lyrics by Zhang Guangtian

I move forward with you, Mao Zedong...
Mao Zedong, Mao Zedong, with you I charge a hail of bullets
When love and battle have become the same today
Give me, ah give me power, Mao Zedong

== See also ==
- Cultural Revolution
- Guoyue
- Historical Chinese anthems
- Musical nationalism
- Nhạc đỏ — political music in Vietnam
