= Stephen Uhalley =

American historian, specializing in aerospace (1930–2024)

Stephen Uhalley Jr.
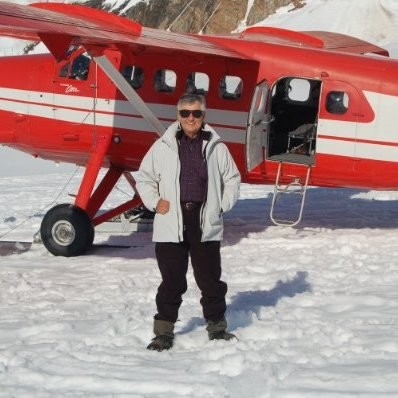
- Born: 1930; Akron, Ohio, U.S.
- Died: 2024 (aged 93–94)
- Spouse: Joan Uhalley
- Children: David

Stephen Uhalley Jr. (1930–2024) was an American historian of Chinese history, specializing in aerospace. He wrote China and Christianity: Burdened Past, Hopeful Future, A History of the Chinese Communist Party, and Mao Tse-tung, a Critical Biography, as well as being a frequent contributor to multiple journals.

== Life and career ==
Uhalley began studying history at San Bernardino Valley College, where he received an Associate of Arts degree after two years (1952–1954). After, he received a bachelor's degree in history from the University of California, Riverside (1954–1956). He then went to Claremont Graduate School and, after only one year, received a master's degree in international relations (1956–1957). After studying and acting as a teaching assistant at Cornell University, he went on to the University of California, Berkeley where he received his Ph.D. in history (1958–1967).

Before pursuing any academia, he served as a chief rifleman in the Amphibian Tractor Crew during the Korean War (1942–1952). During the time he studied for his undergraduate degrees, however, he worked as a steelworker at the Kaiser Steel Corporation (1952–1957). After receiving his graduate degree, he began work as an assistant representative at The Asia Foundation (1960–1967). Following his Ph.D., he became an assistant professor at The University of Arizona (1967–1968), and then an associate professor of history at Duke University (1968–1970).

He then became a professor at the University of Hawaii at Manoa, where he stayed for 25 years (1970–1995), when the department had several important historians of Asia, and upon retirement, was made an emeritus.

Uhalley co-edited the text, China and Christianity: Burdened Past, Hopeful Future: Burdened Past, Hopeful Future, with Xiaowin Wu.

He remained an active historian in retirement, residing in Novato, California. Uhalley died in 2024.

== Bibliography ==
- China and Christianity: Burdened Past, Hopeful Future, coedited by S Uhalley, X Wu (R. E. Sharpe, 2001, reprinted, Routledge, 2015), ISBN 0-7656-0662-3
- A history of the Chinese communist party, by S Uhalley (Hoover Inst. Pr. 1988) ISBN 9780817986124
- Mao Tse-tung: a critical biography, by S Uhalley - (New York, New Viewpoints,1975) ISBN 9780531055717
