= Along the Songhua River =

Chinese patriotic song

"Along the Songhua River" (Chinese: 松花江上; pinyin: Sōnghuā Jiāng Shàng) is a patriotic song from the War of Resistance in the People's Republic of China and formerly of the Republic of China.

== History ==
The song describes the lives of the people who had lost their homeland along the Songhua River, after the Mukden Incident of September 18, 1931 (「九.一八」) in Northeast China.

It was written and composed by Zhang Hanhui.

== Lyrics ==
Simplified Chinese	Traditional Chinese	Pinyin	English translation
我的家在东北松花江上， 那里有森林煤矿， 还有那满山遍野的大豆高粱。 我的家在东北松花江上， 那里有我的同胞，还有那衰老的爹娘。 「九.一八」，「九.一八！」从那个悲惨的时候， 「九.一八」，「九.一八！」从那个悲惨的时候， 脱离了我的家乡，抛弃那无尽的宝藏， 流浪！流浪！整日价在关内，流浪！ 哪年哪月，才能够回到我那可爱的故乡？ 哪年哪月，才能够收回我那无尽的宝藏？ 爹娘啊，爹娘啊！什么时候才能欢聚在一堂？	我的家在東北松花江上， 那裏有森林煤礦， 還有那滿山遍野的大豆高粱。 我的家在東北松花江上， 那裏有我的同胞，還有那衰老的爹娘。 「 九.一八 」，「 九.一八！ 」從那個悲慘的時候， 「 九.一八 」，「 九.一八！ 」從那個悲慘的時候， 脫離了我的家鄉，拋棄那無盡的寶藏， 流浪！流浪！整日價在關內，流浪！ 哪年哪月，纔能夠回到我那可愛的故鄉？ 哪年哪月，纔能夠收回我那無盡的寶藏？ 爹娘啊，爹娘啊！甚麼時候纔能歡聚在一堂？	wǒ de jiā zài Dōngběi Sōnghuā Jiāng shang nàli yǒu sēnlín méikuàng, háiyǒu nà mǎnshānbiànyě de dàdòu gāoliáng. wǒ de jiā zài Dōngběi Sōnghuā Jiāng shàng, nàli yǒu wǒ de tóngbāo, háiyǒu nà shuāilǎo de diē-niáng. Jiǔ-Yībā, Jiǔ-Yībā! cóng nàgè bēicǎn de shíhou, Jiǔ-Yībā, Jiǔ-Yībā! cóng nàgè bēicǎn de shíhou, tuōlí le wǒ de jiāxiāng, pāoqì nà wújìn de bǎozàng, liúlàng! liúlàng! zhěngrìjia zài Guānnèi, liúlàng! nǎ nián nǎ yuè, cái nénggòu huídào wǒ nà kě'ài de gùxiāng? nǎ nián nǎ yuè, cái nénggòu shōuhuí wǒ nà wújìn de bǎozàng? diē-niáng a, diē-niáng a! shénme shíhou cái néng huānjù zài yītáng?	My home is on Songhua River in the Northeast. There are forests, coal mines, soybeans and sorghum all over the mountain. My home is on Songhua River in the Northeast. Over there, my fellow countrymen and my old parents are. September 18, September 18, since that miserable day, September 18, September 18, since that miserable day, I've left my homeland, discarded the endless treasure. Roam, Roam, the whole day I roam inside the Great Wall. When can I go back to my homeland? When can I get back my endless treasure? My mother, my father, when can we gather together?
