= Đinh Nhu =

Vietnamese composer

Đinh Nhu (Hải Phòng, 1910 – Yên Bái, 17 March 1945) was a Vietnamese songwriter and independence activist against the French. He was one of the earliest composers of what is today known as Nhạc đỏ, "Red Music," or Vietnamese revolutionary music. After participating in the Nghệ Tĩnh uprising in 1930 Nhu was imprisoned, but while in prison organized cultural events such as plays and choirs.
