= Military anthem of China =

The military anthem of China is a Chinese patriotic song that dates back to the formation of the New Armies of the late Qing dynasty. The succeeding Chinese regimes have recycled the music and changed the lyrics.

Urban legend states that the music was taken from the Prussian March of the Emperor Wilhelm II; however, no piece by this name can be found in Armeemarschsammlung. The original Qing lyrics were commissioned by Zeng Guofan for the Xiang Army. The same lyrics were used during the Yuan Shikai regime and known as the Soldier's Training Song. After the Xinhai Revolution, the lyrics were changed again and continued to be used by the Chinese military. A well known variant was the National Revolution Army Song.

The Communists reworded the song into the Land Revolution Is Successful. A further modification transformed the song into Three Rules and Eight Notices, which is the best known form today. The latest lyrics are an extension of Zeng Guofan's version, and add additional rules to further inspire soldiers' discipline. At the 1984 Summer Olympics in Los Angeles, the music was used in the presence of representatives of the People's Republic of China and the Republic of China.
