= Unity Is Strength =

1943 Chinese patriotic song written by Mu Hong and Lu Su

"Unity Is Strength" (simplified Chinese: 团结就是力量; traditional Chinese: 團結就是力量; pinyin: Tuánjié jiùshì lìliàng) is a Chinese patriotic song written by Mu Hong and Lu Su in June 1943. Despite being written as the finale act to an opera of the same name, the song gained popularity as a standalone anti-Japanese propaganda piece, and soon became widely used among numerous Chinese guerrilla groups, most notably the Chinese Communist Party. The song remains a popular patriotic song today, and in an online poll hosted by the State Administration of Press, Publication, Radio, Film and Television in 2015, Unity is Strength was voted among the top ten songs of the Second Sino-Japanese War.

== History ==
Unity is Strength was jointly written in June 1943 by Mu Hong, also the composer of I Love the Eighth Route Army and a major contributor to the production of the Yellow River Cantata, and Lu Su, another well known Chinese communist musician. Allegedly, the song was written in only three days after the lukewarm reception of an opera they had produced under the same name. After facing criticism that the opera ended too abruptly, the two wrote Unity is Strength as a finale act.

The piece was written in a small mountain village in Shaanxi Province, with the lyrics reportedly inspired by the harsh treatment of local peasants by their landlords, and the song was used by the peasants in attempts to appeal for lowered rent. The song quickly became popular throughout Western and Northern China, and was adopted by the Chinese Communist Party as one of their most frequently used pieces both during and after the Chinese Civil War. The song remains a popular piece to this day, and has been performed at numerous significant points in Chinese history, being used during the Bao Jia Weiguo Campaign during the Korean War, during the 1998 Chinese Flood relief, and being sung at the 2008 Beijing Olympics.

== Lyrics ==
Simplified Chinese	Traditional Chinese	Pinyin	English Translation
团结就是力量 团结就是力量 这力量是铁 这力量是钢 比铁还硬 比钢还强 向着法西斯蒂开火 让一切不民主的制度死亡 向着太阳 向着自由 向着新中国 发出万丈光芒 重复	團結就是力量 團結就是力量 這力量是鐵 這力量是鋼 比鐵還硬 比鋼還強 向著法西斯蒂開火 讓一切不民主的製度死亡 向著太陽 向著自由 向著新中國 發出萬丈光芒 重複	tuán jié jiù shì lì liáng tuán jié jiù shì lì liáng zhè lì liáng shì tiě zhè lì liáng shì gāng bǐ tiě huán yìng bǐ gāng huán qiáng xiàng zhuó fǎ xī sī dì kāi huǒ ràng yī qiē bù mín zhǔ dí zhì dù sǐ wáng xiàng zhuó tài yáng xiàng zhuó zì yóu xiàng zhuó xīn zhōng guó fā chū wàn zhàng guāng máng Chóngfù	Unity is strength Unity is strength This power is iron This force is steel Harder than iron Stronger than steel Fire upon Fascism; Let all undemocratic systems die Towards the sun Towards freedom Towards New China; Emit a radiant glow Repeat

== See also ==
- Maoism
- "Solidarity Forever"
- "Ode to the Motherland"
- "Sailing the Seas Depends on the Helmsman"
- "Without the Communist Party, There Would Be No New China"
