= Nanniwan =

Revolutionary song popular in People's Republic of China

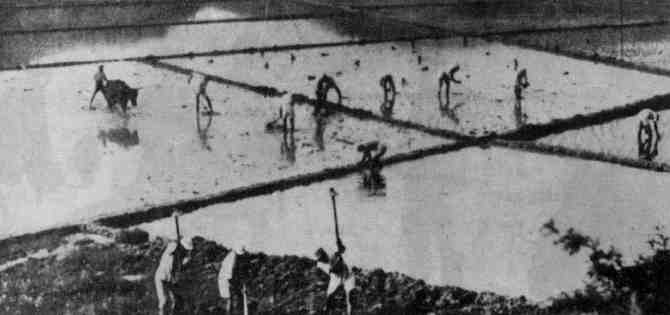
- Soldiers working in Nanniwan in 1943
- Simplified Chinese: 南泥湾
- Traditional Chinese: 南泥灣
- Literal meaning: south muddy bay
Transcriptions
Standard Mandarin
- Hanyu Pinyin: Nánníwān
- Wade–Giles: Nan^{2}-ni^{2}-wan^{1}

"Nanniwan" is a revolutionary song written in 1943 with lyrics by communist playwright and poet He Jingzhi and music by Ma Ke. It was made popular by the Chinese Communist Party and continues to be one of the most recognisable songs in the People's Republic of China.

Nanniwan is a gorge about 90 km southeast of Yan'an, Shaanxi province. In response to economic blockades by the Imperial Japanese Army and Kuomintang in 1941, the Communists set up crops production committee with Ren Bishi as its head and began experimenting with small scale agricultural development as well as poppy production in a bid to become self-sufficient. The 359th brigade of the Eighth Route Army was deployed to Nanniwan to improve productivity. In 1943 Nanniwan was heralded a success, and a propagandist song was commissioned. The lyrics, written by He Jingzhi, were set to a traditional folk melody of northern Shaanxi.

The song rose during the last years of the Second Sino-Japanese War and continued to be popular after the Communist victory in 1949. It is the signature song of the important revolutionary singer Wang Kun, and Cui Jian, widely regarded as the "father of Chinese rock," created a rock version of the song in 1987. It experienced a revival during the mid-1990s along with other revolutionary songs, with the release of many re-adaptations in Guoyue compilations. In the late 20th century Nan Ni Wan was also remade into a Chinese popular Lunar New Year song entitled "Cai Yuan Gun Gun" (财源滚滚), sung by Cindy Wong (黄美诗) and Zheng Yi (郑仪) – Malaysian Chinese singers.

== Cui Jian performance controversy ==
Cui Jian was invited to perform for an annual official TV gala in 1987 where he sang a version of the song that was distinctly different. His version removed the final stanza that hails the achievements of the 359th Brigade, changing the tone of the song to sound more like a lament. The commander of the 359th Brigade, Wang Zhen, took offense and the performance cost Cui his job – he was banned from performing and forced to perform underground. Undeterred, Cui continued to perform Nanniwan at nearly every major performance of his following the ban. It peaked at number one on the Chinese Pop Chart.

== Lyrics ==
Simplified chinese	Traditional chinese	Pinyin	Translation
花篮的花儿香 听我来唱一唱 唱一唱 来到了南泥湾 南泥湾好地方 好地呀方 好地方来好风光 好地方来好风光 到处是庄稼 遍地是牛羊 往年的南泥湾 处处是荒山 没呀人烟 如今的南泥湾 与往年不一般 不呀一般 如呀今的南泥湾 与呀往年不一般 再不是旧模样 是陕北的好江南 陕北的好江南 鲜花开满山 开呀满山 学习那南泥湾 处处是江南 是呀江南 又学习来又生产 三五九旅是模范 咱们走向前 鲜花送模范	花籃的花兒香 聽我來唱一唱 唱一呀唱 來到了南泥灣 南泥灣好地方 好地呀方 好地方來好風光 好地方來好風光 到處是莊稼 遍地是牛羊 往年的南泥灣 處處是荒山 沒呀人煙 如今的南泥灣 與往年不一般 不一呀般 如呀今的南泥灣 與呀往年不一般 再不是舊模樣 是陝北的好江南 陝北的好江南 鮮花開滿山 開呀滿山 學習那南泥灣 處處是江南 是呀江南 又學習來又生產 三五九旅是模範 咱們走向前 鮮花送模範	Huālán de huā er xiāng Tīng wǒ lái chàng yī chàng Chàng yī ya chàng Lái dàole nán ní wān Nán ní wān hǎo dìfāng Hǎo de ya fāng Hǎo dìfāng lái hǎo fēngguāng Hǎo dìfāng lái hǎo fēngguāng Dàochù shì zhuāngjia Biàndì shì niú yáng Wǎngnián de nán ní wān Chùchù shì huāngshān Méi ya rén yān Rújīn de nán ní wān Yǔ wǎngnián bù yībān Bù yī ya bān Rú ya jīn de nán ní wān Yǔ ya wǎngnián bù yībān Zài bu shì jiù múyàng Shì shǎnběi de hǎo jiāngnán Shǎnběi de hǎo jiāngnán Xiānhuā kāi mǎn shān Kāi ya mǎn shān Xuéxí nà nán ní wān Chùchù shì jiāngnán Shì ya jiāngnán Yòu xuéxí lái yòu shēngchǎn Sānwǔjiǔ lǚ shì mófàn Zánmen zǒuxiàng qián Xiānhuā sòng mófàn	Flowers in a basket are fragrant Listen to me sing a little Sing for a little Come to Nanniwan; Nanniwan is a nice place Nice place Nice place and beautiful scenery Nice place and beautiful scenery Crops everywhere Cattle and sheep all around Nanniwan in years gone by Was a barren mountain With no people around Nanniwan today Is different from the past Nanniwan today Is different from the past And no longer looks like it did It is the Jiangnan* of Northern Shaanxi The Jiangnan of Northern Shaanxi; Mountains full of flowers Mountains blossoming Know that in Nanniwan; Everywhere is like Jiangnan; Yes, like Jiangnan; Learning again how to cultivate The 359th Brigade sets the example Let us go forward Let the example blossom

* This lyric, referring to Nanniwan as "Jiangnan", implies it is as prosperous as the extremely fertile area immediately south of the Yangtze.
