= Beijing Municipal Committee of the Chinese People's Political Consultative Conference =

Chinese municipal government advisory body

Beijing Municipal Committee of the Chinese People's Political Consultative Conference 中国人民政治协商会议北京市委员会
- 14th
- Emblem of the Chinese People's Political Consultative Conference

Type
- Type: United front organ Constitutional convention (Historical); Legislature (Historical) of Chinese People's Political Consultative Conference

History
- Founded: April 26, 1955; 71 years ago
- Preceded by: Beijing Municipal People's Congress Consultative Committee

Leadership
- Chairperson: Wei Xiaodong

Website
- www.bjzx.gov.cn

Chinese name
- Simplified Chinese: 中国人民政治协商会议北京市委员会
- Traditional Chinese: 中國人民政治協商會議北京市委員會
Transcriptions
Standard Mandarin
- Hanyu Pinyin: Zhōngguó Rénmín Zhèngzhì Xiéshāng Huìyì Běijīngshì Wěiyuánhuì

Abbreviation
- Simplified Chinese: 北京市政协
- Traditional Chinese: 北京市政協
- Literal meaning: CPPCC Beijing Municipal Committee
Transcriptions
Standard Mandarin
- Hanyu Pinyin: Beijingshì Zhèngxié

The Beijing Municipal Committee of the Chinese People's Political Consultative Conference (Chinese: 中国人民政治协商会议北京市委员会) is the advisory body and a local organization of the Chinese People's Political Consultative Conference in Beijing, China. it is supervised and directed by the Beijing Municipal Committee of the Chinese Communist Party.

== History ==
The Beijing Municipal Committee of the Chinese People's Political Consultative Conference traces its origins to the Beijing Municipal People's Congress Consultative Committee (北京市各界人民代表会议协商委员会), founded in 1949.

=== Anti-corruption campaign ===
On 25 August 2020, vice chairperson Li Wei was put under investigation for alleged "serious violations of discipline and laws" by the Central Commission for Discipline Inspection (CCDI), the party's internal disciplinary body, and the National Supervisory Commission, the highest anti-corruption agency of China. On 18 March 2022, he was sentenced to 9 years in prison on taking bribes and fine of one million yuan, and his illegal gains will be confiscated and his case transferred to the judiciary.

== Term ==
=== 1st ===
- Term: April 1955 – September 1959
- Chairperson: Liu Ren
- Vice Chairpersons: Zhang Youyu, Jiang Guangnai, Wu Han, Xiao Ming, Qian Duansheng, Liang Sicheng, Yu Xinqing, Ling Qijun
- Secretary-General: Cui Yueli

=== 2nd ===
- Term: September 1959 – December 1962
- Chairperson: Liu Ren
- Vice Chairpersons: Wan Li, Chen Peng, Jiang Guangnai, Wu Han, Liang Sicheng, Chen Yuan, Wang Jiong, Yu Xinqing, Ling Qijun, Lin Qiaozhi
- Secretary-General: Liao Masha

=== 3rd ===
- Term: December 1962 – September 1965
- Chairperson: Liu Ren
- Vice Chairpersons: Wan Li, Chen Peng, Jiang Guangnai, Wu Han, Liang Sicheng, Chen Yuan, Yu Xinqing, Ling Qijun, Lin Qiaozhi, Liao Masha, Wang Yuanxing
- Secretary-General: Liao Masha (concurrently)

=== 4th ===
- Term: September 1965 – November 1977
- Chairperson: Liu Ren
- Vice Chairpersons: Wan Li, Jiang Guangnai, Wu Han, Yu Xinqing, Ling Qijun, Lin Qiaozhi, Cui Yueli, Wang Yuanxing, Yang Kuanlin, Xia Xiang
- Secretary-General: Cui Yueli (concurrently)

=== 5th ===
- Term: November 1977 – March 1983
- Chairperson: Ding Guoyu (November 1977 – December 1979) → Zhao Pengfei (December 1979 –)
- Vice Chairpersons: Zheng Tianxiang, Liu Shaowen, Wang Xiaoyi, Guo Yingqiu, Chen Kehan, Fan Rusheng, Yan Jici, Zhang Liang, Fan Jin, Cui Yueli, Gao Ge, Xia Xiang, Hou Jingru, Wen Jiasi, Pu Jiexiu, Lei Jieqiong, Liao Masha, Liu Yong, Guo Buyue, Luo Qing, He Yizhang, Liang Zhengzhong, Lin Tong, Wang Ziru, Zhang Guangdou, Su Congzhou, Lu Zongda, Sun Fuling, Gu Junzheng, Ding Gongnan, Chen Mingshao, Wu Baosan
- Secretary-General: Gao Ge (concurrently)

=== 6th ===
- Term: March 1983 – January 1988
- Chairperson: Liu Daosheng (March 1983 – March 1985) → Fan Jin (March 1985 – May 1986) → Bai Jiefu (May 1986 – )
- Vice Chairpersons: Gao Ge, Liao Masha, Su Congzhou, Lu Zongda, Liu Yong, Deng Jixing, Xia Xiang, Zhang Guangdou, Guo Buyue, Wu Baosan, Ding Gongnan, Kan Guanqing, Luo Qing, Lin Tong, Guan Shixiong, Li Bokang, Li Chen, Gan Ying, An Lin
- Secretary-General: Li Tianshou

=== 7th ===
- Term: January 1988 – February 1993
- Chairperson: Bai Jiefu
- Vice Chairpersons: Feng Mingwei, Wang Daming, Guan Shixiong, Sun Fuling, Zhang Mingyi, Li Bokang, Xia Xiang, Xu Jialu, Zhu Chenyu, Kan Guanqing, Chen Zhongyi, Gan Ying
- Secretary-General: Li Tianshou (– April 1989) → Du Shenwei (April 1989 –)

=== 8th ===
- Term: February 1993 – January 1998
- Chairperson: Wang Daming
- Vice Chairpersons: Feng Mingwei, Sun Fuling, Shen Rendao, Huang Jicheng (– December 1996), Chen Zhongyi, Zhu Chenyu, Chen Dabai, Wang Shuhuan, Lu Songhua, Zhang Lianyun, Qian Yi, Wan Siquan, Wang Zhitai, Jin Jin
- Secretary-General: Du Shenwei (– March 1996) → Song Weiliang (March 1996 –)
- Advisor: Li Bokang

=== 9th ===
- Term: January 1998 – February 2003
- Chairperson: Chen Guangwen
- Vice Chairpersons: Shen Rendao, Lu Songhua, Wan Siquan, Qian Yi, Du Yijin, Li Disheng, Song Weiliang, Han Ruqi, Zhu Xiangyuan, Lu Daopei, Sun Anmin, Michael Fu Tieshan, Zhu Yucheng, Bi Qun, Mei Xiangming, Huang Yiyun, Man Yunlai
- Secretary-General: Song Weiliang (– February 2001) → Huang Yiyun (February 2001 –)

=== 10th ===
- Term: January 2003 – January 2008
- Chairperson: Cheng Shi'e (– January 2006) → Yang Anjiang (January 2006 –)
- Vice Chairpersons: Huang Yiyun, Huang Chengxiang, Han Ruqi, Zhu Xiangyuan, Michael Fu Tieshan, Man Yunlai, Wang Changlian, Zhang Heping, Chen Nanxian, Chen Jiansheng, Ye Wenhu, Tang Xiaoqing, Chen Ping
- Secretary-General: Li Jianhua

=== 11th ===
- Term: January 2008 – January 2013
- Chairperson: Yang Anjiang (– January 2011) → Wang Anshun (January 2011 –)
- Vice Chairpersons: Shen Baochang, Tang Xiaoqing, Wang Wei (January 2009 – December 2009), Chen Ping, Zhao Wenzhi, Xiong Daxin, Fu Huimin, Ge Jianping, Wang Yongqing, Ma Dalong, Cai Guoxiong, Li Xiaohong (January 2010 – January 2012)
- Secretary-General: Yan Zhongqiu

=== 12th ===
- Term: January 2013 – January 2018
- Chairperson: Ji Lin
- Vice Chairpersons: Shen Baochang (– January 2016), Tang Xiaoqing, Chen Ping (– January 2017), Zhao Wenzhi, Fu Huimin, Ge Jianping, Wang Yongqing, Ma Dalong, Cai Guoxiong, Yan Zhongqiu, Li Changyou (January 2016 –), Li Shixiang (January 2017 –)
- Secretary-General: Zhou Yuqiu

=== 13th ===
- Term: January 2018 – January 2023
- Chairperson: Ji Lin (– January 2022) → Wei Xiaodong (January 2022 –)
- Vice Chairpersons: Yang Yiwen, Cheng Hong, Li Wei (– October 2020), Niu Qingshan (– January 2022), Lin Fusheng, Yu Luming (– May 2022), Liu Zhongfan, Chen Jun, Yan Ying, Wang Ning (January 2021 –), Cui Shuqiang (January 2022 –), Zhang Jiaming (January 2022 –), Yang Bin (January 2022 –), Wang Hong (January 2022 –)
- Secretary-General: Yan Liqiang → Yu Changhui (January 2022 –)

=== 14th ===
- Term: January 2023 – 2028
- Chairperson: Wei Xiaodong
- Vice Chairpersons: Cui Shuqiang, Zhang Jiaming, Cheng Hong, Lu Yan, Wang Hong, Lin Fusheng (– January 2025), Liu Zhongfan, Chen Jun, Yan Ying, Wang Jinnan, Guo Yanhong (January 2025 –)
- Leading Party Members' Group Member: Han Zirong
- Secretary-General: Han Yu
