= 2022 Winter Paralympics closing ceremony =

- Part of 2022 Winter Paralympics
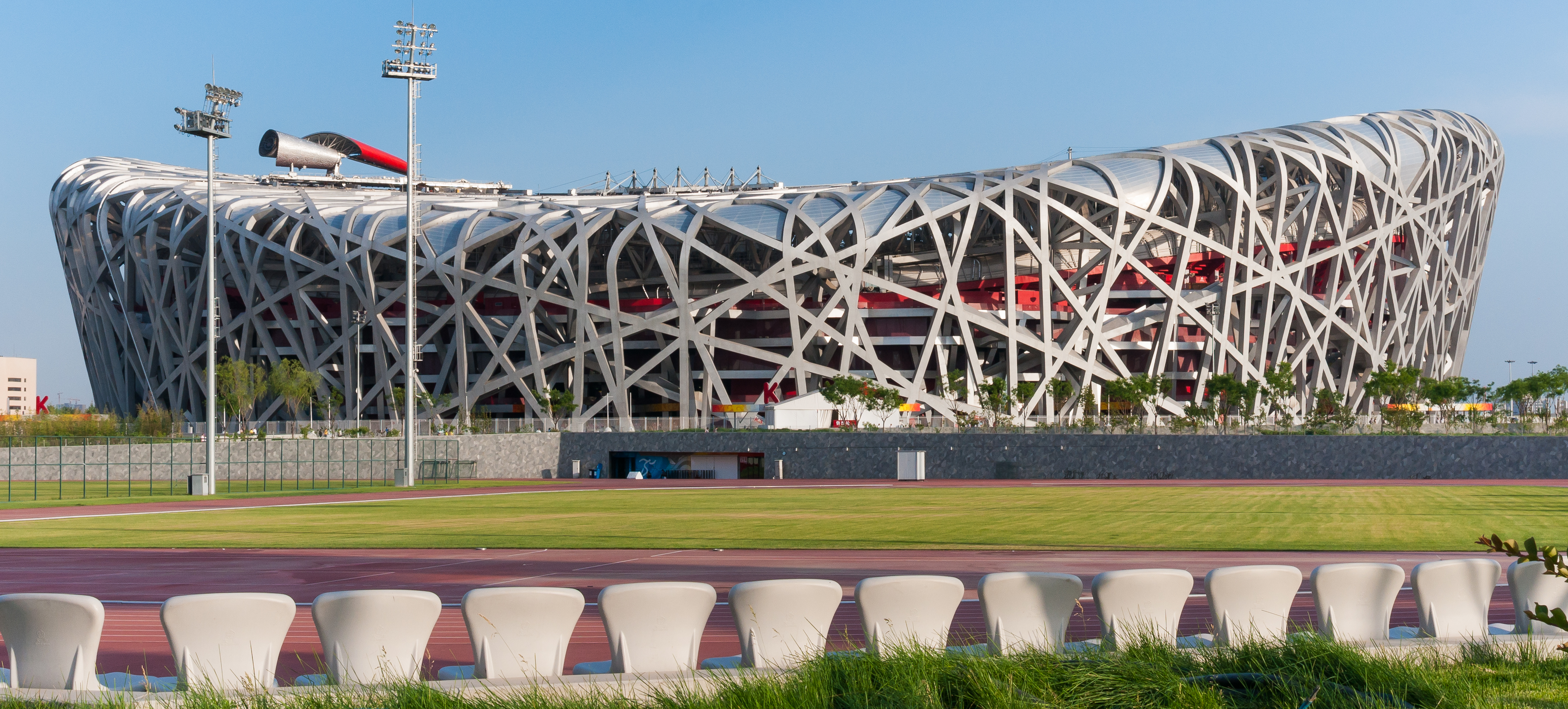
- The Beijing National Stadium hosted the closing ceremony.
- Date: 13 March 2022; 4 years ago
- Time: 20:00–21:00 CST (UTC+8)
- Venue: Beijing National Stadium
- Location: Beijing, China; 39°59′30″N 116°23′26″E
- Theme: "Call of Love"
- Filmed by: Olympic Broadcasting Services (OBS)
- Footage: The ceremony on the IPC YouTube channel on YouTube

The closing ceremony of the 2022 Winter Paralympics took place at the Beijing National Stadium in Beijing, China, on March 13, 2022.

== Preparations ==
The site of the closing ceremony, the Beijing National Stadium, was redeveloped in preparation for the ceremonies of both the 2022 Winter Olympics and the 2022 Winter Paralympics.

Zhang Yimou was the director of the closing ceremony of the 2022 Winter Paralympics. He was also the director of the opening ceremony as well as the opening and closing ceremonies of the 2022 Winter Olympics.

== Proceedings ==
The ceremony included the flags of the 46 competing nations and their entry into the stadium accompanied by an arrangement of Beethoven's Ode to Joy.

A "call to love" performance occurred afterwards.

Anna Scavuzzo and Gianpietro Ghedina, the vice mayors of Milan and Cortina d'Ampezzo, Italy, respectively, were at the closing ceremony for the handover of the Paralympic flag, as the 2026 Winter Paralympics is scheduled to be held in Milan and Cortina d'Ampezzo, Italy. The handover ceremony was called "we are the light". The flame was then extinguished.

== Dignitaries in attendance ==
=== Host nation dignitaries ===
- China –
  - CCP general secretary, CMC chairman and Chinese president Xi Jinping
  - CCP Politburo Standing Committee member and Chinese premier Li Keqiang
  - Party secretary of Beijing, CCP Politburo member and Organizing Committee chairman Cai Qi

=== International dignitaries ===
- Italy – Vice Mayor of Milan Anna Scavuzzo
- Italy - Vice-Mayor of Cortina d'Ampezzo Gianpietro Ghedina

=== Dignitaries from International organizations ===
- and (International Olympic Committee) International Paralympic Committee – President Andrew Parsons

== Anthems ==
- National Anthem of China
- Paralympic Hymn
- National Anthem of Italy – Sang by Arisa

== See also ==
- 2022 Winter Olympics opening ceremony
- 2022 Winter Olympics closing ceremony
- 2022 Winter Paralympics opening ceremony
