= 2022 Winter Paralympics opening ceremony =

- Part of 2022 Winter Paralympics
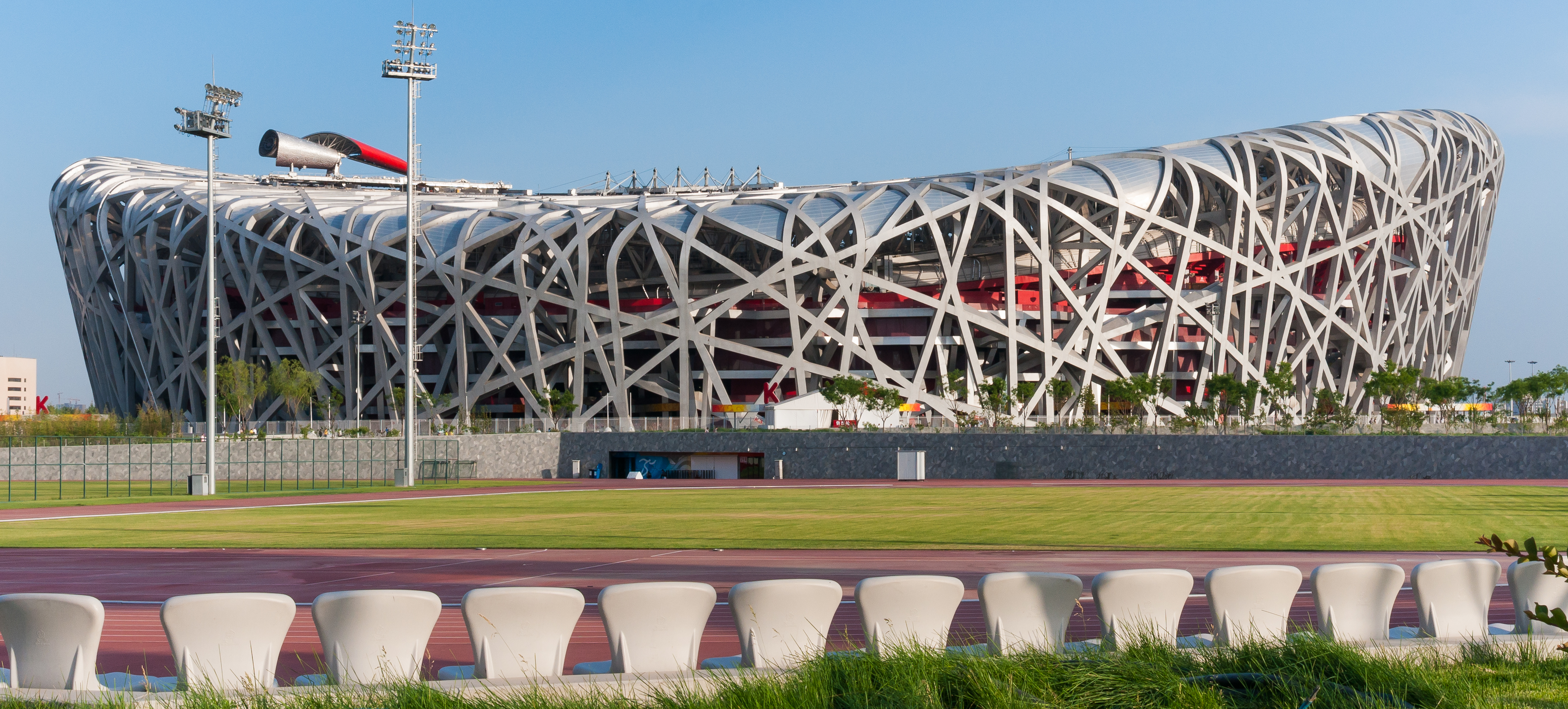
- The Beijing National Stadium hosted the opening ceremony.
- Date: 4 March 2022; 4 years ago
- Time: 20:00–21:33 CST (UTC+8)
- Venue: Beijing National Stadium
- Location: Beijing, China; 39°59′30″N 116°23′26″E
- Theme: "Blossoming of Life"
- Filmed by: Olympic Broadcasting Services (OBS)
- Footage: The ceremony on the IPC YouTube channel on YouTube

The opening ceremony of the 2022 Winter Paralympics took place on 4 March 2022 at the Beijing National Stadium (also known as "Bird's Nest") in Beijing, China. The Games were opened by Xi Jinping, General Secretary of the Chinese Communist Party and President of China.

== Preparations ==
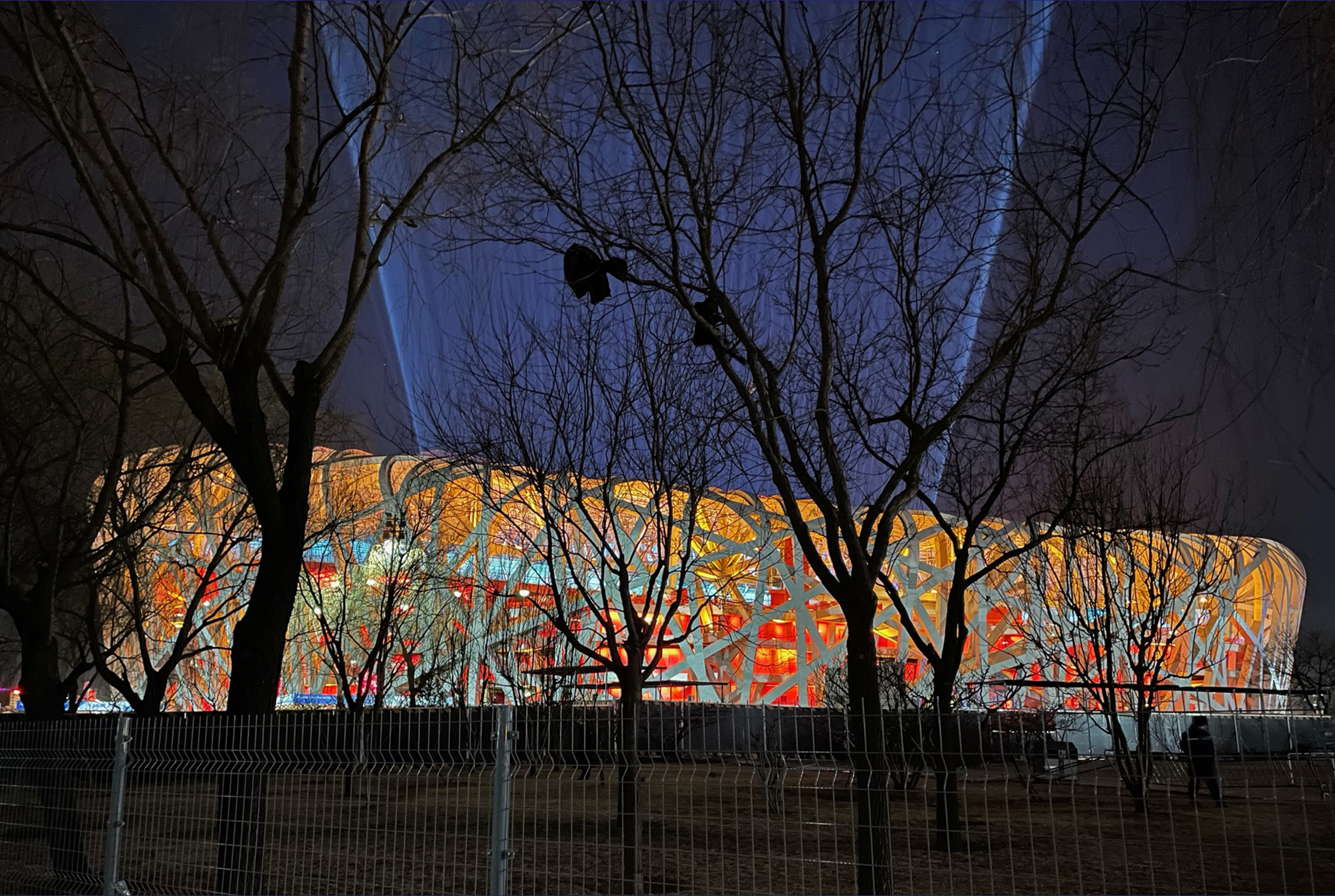
The Beijing National Stadium where the opening ceremony was held.

The site of the opening ceremony, the Beijing National Stadium, was redeveloped in preparation for the ceremonies of both the 2022 Winter Olympics and the 2022 Winter Paralympics.

== Announcers (masters of ceremony) ==
- English: Zhao Ying
- Mandarin Chinese: Gang Qiang

== Proceedings ==
The ceremony, directed by Zhang Yimou, had the theme "Blossoming of Life" and began at 20:00 CST (UTC+8) in the Beijing National Stadium. The games were opened by Xi Jinping, General Secretary of the Chinese Communist Party and President of China, and International Paralympic Committee (IPC) president Andrew Parsons were in attendance. As well as representing the IPC, Parsons represented the International Olympic Committee in the absence of president Thomas Bach who tested positive for COVID-19.

A countdown performance of the curling rink occurred before the entry of the Flag of China.

=== Reactions to Russian invasion of Ukraine ===
Russian and Belarusian athletes were banned from participating after the countries' invasion of Ukraine. During the ceremony, Parsons did not mention Russia by name, but he publicly declared his horror at the fighting in Ukraine and called on world authorities to promote peace.

=== Entry of Paralympic Flag ===
Flag bearers of the Paralympic Flag achieved the goal of "Combination of the Sound and the Disabled":

- Chen Qi (陈琦): former wheelchair athlete and Caption of China men's national wheelchair basketball team at the 2008 Beijing Paralympics. As the current head coach of China women's national wheelchair basketball team, he led the team to win the historic silver medal of wheelchair basketball at the 2020 Tokyo Paralympics.
- Hao Guohua (郝国华): Judge of goalball at the 2008 Beijing Paralympics and he took the Paralympic oath on behalf of all officials at the opening ceremony.
- Liu Yutong (刘禹彤): Gold medalist of badminton at the 2020 Tokyo Paralympics.
- Yao Juan (姚娟): Athletics athlete at six consecutive Paralympics (2000 Sydney, 2004 Athens, 2008 Beijing, 2012 London, 2016 Rio and 2020 Tokyo), winning 5 golds in total.
- Zhang Li (张丽): Gold medalist of swimming at 2016 Rio Paralympics and 2020 Tokyo Paralympics, winning 6 golds and 1 silver in total.
- Sun Gang (孙刚): Wheelchair fencer at the 2016 Rio Paralympics and 2020 Tokyo Paralympics, winning 4 golds, 2 silvers and 1 bronze in total.
- Xue Juan (薛娟): Gold medalist of table tennis at 2016 Rio Paralympics and 2020 Tokyo Paralympics, winning 4 golds in total.
- Li Hao (李豪): Wheelchair fencer at the 2020 Tokyo Paralympics, winning 2 golds.

=== Oath taking ===
The representative of the oath taking were:

- Athlete:
  - Zhang Mengqiu (张梦秋) (Alpine skiing)
  - Chen Jianxin (陈建新) (Wheelchair Curling): Vice Skip of China national wheelchair curling team (Skip: Wang Haitao).
- Coach:
  Yue Qingshuang (岳清爽) (Wheelchair Curling): Head coach of China national wheelchair curling team, bronze medalist of 2010 Vancouver Olympics, and the only non Northern American or European curling world champion (skip: Wang Bingyu, 2009 World Championship).
- Official: Zhang Liheng (张立恒) (Para Ice Hockey).

=== Arrival and lighting of the Paralympic flame ===
Torch bearers in the National Stadium on the opening ceremony were:

- Liu Sitong (刘思彤): Alpine Skier at the 2018 Pyeongchang Paralympics and 2022 Beijing Paralympics.
- Wen Xiaoyan (文晓燕): Gold medalist of para-athletics at the 2016 Rio Paralympics and 2020 Tokyo Paralympics, winning 5 golds and 1 silver in total.
- Ma Jia (马佳): Gold medalist of para swimming at the 2020 Tokyo Paralympics and record holder of women's 50 metre freestyle S11 & women's 200 metre individual medley SM11.
- Zhang Xuemei (张雪梅): Silver medalist of wheelchair basketball at the 2020 Tokyo Paralympics, member of China women's national wheelchair basketball team and flagbearer of Team China on 2020 Summer Paralympics closing ceremony.
- Liu Cuiqing (刘翠青) & Xu Donglin (徐冬林) (Paralympic guide and in-field guide): Gold medalists of 2016 Rio Paralympics and 2020 Tokyo Paralympics, winning 4 gold medals, 2 silver medals and 1 bronze medal in total.
- Dong Chao (董超): Medalist of shooting at four consecutive Paralympics (2008 Beijing, 2012 London, 2016 Rio & 2020 Tokyo), winning 3 gold medals and 3 bronze medals in total.
- Tang Xuemei (唐雪梅): Medalist of sitting volleyball in three consecutive Paralympics (Gold at 2012 London and Silver at 2016 Rio & 2020 Tokyo).

Visually-impaired Paralympic champion Li Duan (李端), who won gold medals at the 2008 Summer Paralympics, which was also held in Beijing, lit the cauldron, becoming the third visually impaired person to light the Paralympics cauldron at the Opening Ceremonies.

== Dignitaries in attendance ==
=== Host nation dignitaries ===
- China
  - Xi Jinping, General Secretary of the Chinese Communist Party, President of China and Chairman of the Central Military Commission
  - Li Keqiang, Premier of China
  - Cai Qi, Party Secretary of Beijing, Executive President of the Organizing Committee for Beijing 2022

=== Dignitaries from International organizations ===
- International Paralympic Committee – President Andrew Parsons.
- International Olympic Committee – IPC President Andrew Parsons in place of IOC Vice President Ng Ser Miang who is unable to attend after testing positive for COVID-19. Ng was to attend in place of IOC President Thomas Bach.

== Anthems ==
- National Anthem of China
- Paralympic Hymn

== Controversy ==
Parsons's speech about how he was "horrified at what is taking place in the world right now", which implied the 2022 Russian invasion of Ukraine, was not translated and muted by China Central Television (CCTV). The IPC later asked CCTV to explain why the speech was not translated and muted. As of 12 March 2022, the IPC has not yet received an update from CCTV, and Parson's speech was completely cut on replay from CCTV's official website later. In addition, Parson's reaction for Ukraine National Team during the Parade of Nation also been cut and replaced by other scene on CCTV's opening ceremony live.

In his speech, Parsons wrongly referred Xi Jinping as the president of the Republic of China, which is the official name of Taiwan and recognized as part of People's Republic of China in Mainland China. Parsons later apologized for this.

== See also ==
- 2008 Summer Paralympics opening ceremony
- 2008 Summer Paralympics closing ceremony
- 2022 Winter Olympics opening ceremony
- 2022 Winter Olympics closing ceremony
- 2022 Winter Paralympics closing ceremony
