= National Conference of Publicity Ministers =

Annual Chinese Communist Party gathering

- 全国宣传部长会议
- Abbreviation: NCPM
- Type: Annual conference
- Headquarters: Beijing, China
- Region served: China
- Official language: Chinese
- Recent chairs: Wang Huning (2022); Cai Qi (2023–2025)
- Parent organization: Chinese Communist Party

National Conference of Publicity Ministers
- Simplified Chinese: 全国宣传部长会议
- Traditional Chinese: 全國宣傳部長會議
Transcriptions
Standard Mandarin
- Hanyu Pinyin: Quánguó Xuānchuán Bùzhǎng Huìyì

The National Conference of Publicity Ministers (NCPM) is an annual conference of the Chinese Communist Party (CCP) that gathers officials related to publicity and ideological work.

== History ==
The first National Conference of Publicity Ministers was held from November 15 to December 2, 1984. In the conference, CCP General Secretary Hu Yaobang encouraged propaganda leaders to push the Four Modernizations. Since then, a total of 34 NCPM meetings were held from 1984 to 2024. In January 1988, the second conference was held, convened by CCP Secretariat member Hu Qili; this conference included the topic of political reform. The third conference was held in October 1988, while the fourth one was held in July 1989. Since then, each conference was held consistently in January of each year, though conferences were not held in 1993 and 1994.

In January 2022, Politburo Standing Committee member Wang Huning chaired the National Conference of Publicity Ministers, where he emphasized the importance of Xi Jinping Thought and called on officials to follow the "442 formula", meaning the Four Consciousnesses, the Four Confidences and the Two Upholds. In January 2023, Politburo Standing Committee member Cai Qi spoke at the National Conference of Publicity Ministers, where he called on officials to use core socialist values, improve foreign propaganda work, and uphold Xi Jinping Thought and Two Establishes and Two Upholds.

At the January 2024 annual NCPM, Cai called on propaganda officials to "strengthen positive publicity and public opinion" and "sing loudly about China's bright economic prospects". In January 2025, Cai called on officials to step up promotion of China's economic achievements at the annual NCPM conference. In January 2026, Cai called on officials to prioritize economic publicity at the annual NCPM conference.
