= BOCOG =

BOCOG may refer to:

- Beijing Organizing Committee for the Olympic Games, for the 2008 Summer Olympics
- Beijing Organizing Committee for the 2022 Olympic and Paralympic Winter Games
- Brisbane Organising Committee for the Olympic Games, for the 2032 Summer Olympics
