= Beijing Organizing Committee =

Beijing Organizing Committee may refer to:

- Beijing Organizing Committee for the Olympic Games, for the 2008 Summer Olympics
- Beijing Organizing Committee for the 2022 Olympic and Paralympic Winter Games
