= 2022 Winter Olympics closing ceremony =

- Part of 2022 Winter Olympics
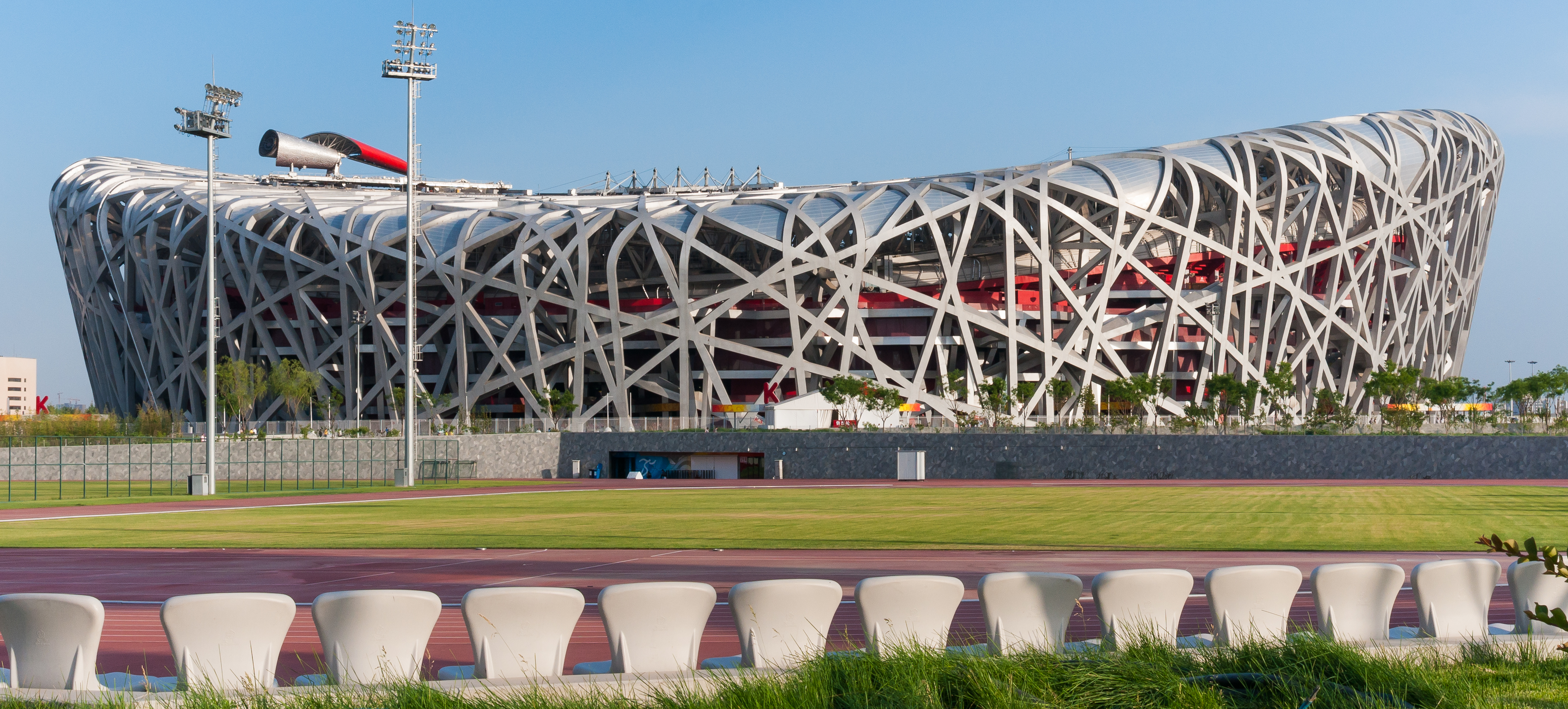
- The Beijing National Stadium hosted the closing ceremony.
- Date: 20 February 2022; 4 years ago
- Time: 20:00–21:50 CST (UTC+8)
- Venue: Beijing National Stadium
- Location: Beijing, China; 39°59′30″N 116°23′26″E
- Theme: One World, One Family
- Filmed by: Olympic Broadcasting Services (OBS)
- Footage: 2022 Winter Games Closing Ceremony in Olympic Channel on YouTube

The 2022 Winter Olympics closing ceremony was held at the Beijing National Stadium in Beijing on 20 February 2022. As mandated by the Olympic Charter, the proceedings are expected to combine the formal ceremonial closing of this international sporting event (including closing speeches, hoisting of the flags, the parade of athletes, and the handover of the Olympic flag) with an artistic spectacle to showcase the culture and history of the current and next host nation (Italy) for the 2026 Winter Olympics in Milan and Cortina d'Ampezzo.

The closing ceremony was directed by film director and producer Zhang Yimou, who also directed the opening ceremonies of the 2022 Winter Olympics and previously directed and produced the opening and closing ceremonies of the 2008 Summer Olympics.

== Theme and Concept ==
According to Zhao Weidong, the 2022 Olympic organizing media committee head, theme of the closing ceremony will be:

- Together For A Shared Future
- Beijing as the city to have hosted both the Summer and Winter Olympics
- Celebrations of athletes' achievements in those games

As stated by Zhang Yimou, the closing ceremony feature the re-creation of a moment from the opening ceremony of the 2008 Summer Olympics, since the Beijing National Stadium was the former venue for both Summer and Winter Olympics ceremonies.

== Ceremony key team ==
- Closing Ceremony Director – Zhang Yimou
- Chief Lighting Designer – Sha Xiaolan

Announcers

- French – Zhang Shanhui (CGTN French news anchor)
- English – Li Dongning (CGTN English news anchor)
- Mandarin Chinese – Kang Hui (CCTV news anchor)

== Proceedings ==
At 8:00 pm China Standard Time, Chinese leader Xi Jinping and International Olympic Committee President Thomas Bach entered the stadium.

As the closing ceremony takes place five days after the Lantern Festival, which is the final day of the Chinese New Year celebrations, a performance was held to celebrate and promote the culture of the Chinese New Year through lanterns. Children danced and played with lanterns while interacting with the large snowflake cauldron in the center of the stadium. Their movement formed the emblem of the 2022 Winter Olympics. The lanterns were shaped like snowflakes to commemorate the overlap of both the Winter Olympics and the Chinese New Year celebration, as well as to highlight the tradition of playing with lanterns during the Lantern Festival. This was followed by the playing of the National Anthem of China.

Continuing from the lantern performance, twelve sleds shaped in the form of Chinese zodiac animals, namely the rat, ox, tiger, rabbit, dragon, snake, horse, goat, monkey, rooster, dog, and pig, carved out a Chinese knot on the floor, joining the children with lanterns in continuing the celebration of the Chinese New Year. The zodiac animals represent the interlinkage of the Chinese calendar and its solar terms. Animations are performed by ribbons wrapped around the giant snowflake cauldron to form a hybrid combination of the Chinese knot and the lantern. The flags of the 91 competing nations entered the stadium first, followed by all the athletes who were still in Beijing marching in together as one group, accompanied by an arrangement of Beethoven's Ode to Joy. The athletes gathered at the knot, symbolizing the Chinese culture of family reunion for the Chinese New Year. A highlights video: "2022 and me", also played. Another highlights video, "2022 and us", played afterwards. The Introduction of the IOC athlete's commission's new member and recognition of the volunteers occurred after the victory ceremonies, as did a video titled "Powered by Belief", and a Moment of Remembrance where the Games bade farewell with a willow twig

First, the Greek flag was raised while the Greek national anthem is played. The Olympic flag was then lowered and folded while the Olympic Hymn was sung in Greek. Afterwards, the flag was passed from the mayor of Beijing, Chen Jining, to IOC president Thomas Bach, who then handed it over to the mayors of Milan, Giuseppe Sala, and Cortina d'Ampezzo, Gianpietro Ghedina. This was followed by the raising of the flag of Italy and the playing of its anthem sung by Italian singer Malika Ayane. During the Italian national anthem, a projection of stars (representing the 7,904 comuni of the country at the time) formed the outline of Italy. The Olympic flag was raised again on 26 July 2024 for the opening ceremonies of the 2024 Summer Olympics in Paris, France.

As per tradition, Milan and Cortina d'Ampezzo, the host cities of the 2026 Winter Olympic Games presented an artistic performance at the closing ceremony of the 2022 Winter Olympics. But due to the ongoing coronavirus pandemic and using this year's organizing concept, "less is more", the producer Marco Balich needed to use only 6 performers.

The artistic performance of the segment is called "Duality, Together", which coincidentally matched with "Together for a shared future", the slogan of the 2022 Winter Olympics. According to Christian Milici (Head of Events), they aimed to celebrate the harmony which links two cities (Milan and Cortina d'Ampezzo) that are seemingly very different, but are in dialogue with each other. Because of this, the segment was focused on the harmony between humanity and nature. The segment starts out with two children with the names of the host cities on each of their backs rolling and hugging a inflated vinyl plastic globe, representing the two next host cities inviting the world for the 2026 games and the history of the Silk Road (a historical important trading route traced by Marco Polo which was the first link between Europe and Asia). The first film depicted the two dancers trekking across the host cities: a man running in the urban landscape of Milan and a woman running in the snowy mountains of Cortina d'Ampezzo, both of whom represent the two cities. After the first film, the two then performed together at the stadium in a modern dance sequel to represent the history and the cultural aspects of Italy. After the segment, a second film was shown depicting various athletes holding several Italian flags and flags with the 2026 Winter Olympics logo. It then shows several open-aired meetings across the country as Frecce Tricolori flies over Venice (main hotspot from Veneto, the region where Cortina is located) and the Italian Alps and introduced the two host regions, Lombardy and Veneto.

Along the final speech and remarks made by Cai Qi, president and chairman of the Beijing Organizing Committee for the 2022 Olympic and Paralympic Winter Games, the IOC President Thomas Bach formally declared the games closed, praising them as excellent and unforgettable, as per the Olympic Charter he invited in French the youth of the world to meet again in Milan and Cortina D'Ampezzo in four years time.

Following the declaration of the closing of the Games, a video was shown of Beijing citizens and Winter Games volunteers bidding farewell to their international guests. It concluded with Olympic mascot Bing Dwen Dwen waving to a snowflake as it flies toward the sky.

The Olympic flame, burning in a torch placed in the middle of a giant snowflake-shaped cauldron, was descending while one of the most striking scenes from the opening ceremony of the 2008 Summer Olympics was being reproduced (when the Olympic rings were formed on a carpet of LEDs that was suspended) gradually extinguished while "You and Me", the theme song of the 2008 Summer Olympics, was sampled when the flame finally touched the ground and was extinguished, then they started to play "Snowflakes", the theme song of the 2022 Winter Olympics, which was sung by the Beijing Philharmonic Choir (北京愛樂合唱團). This scene was written to highlight the fact that the city made the historical achievement of being the first city to host both the Summer and Winter Olympic Games, to end the ceremony as the Olympic Charter determines, and a large display of fireworks started. A large display of fireworks followed and ended the show along with the farewell musical song "Auld Lang Syne", sung by all member artists and the musical choir, because the closing ceremony ended exactly at 21:40 CST, to mark the end of the 2022 Winter Olympics.

=== Victory ceremonies ===
Women's cross-country skier medalists

- Therese Johaug (NOR)
- Jessie Diggins (USA)
- Kerttu Niskanen (FIN)

Men's cross-country skier medalists

- Alexander Bolshunov (ROC)
- Ivan Yakimushkin (ROC)
- Simen Hegstad Krüger (NOR)

==== Production team ====
- Head of events: Christian Milici
- Creative director: Marco Balich
- Artistic director: Lidia Castelli

==== Performers ====
- Violinist: Giovanni Andrea Zanon
- Singer: Malika Ayane

== Dignitaries in attendance ==
=== Host nation dignitaries ===
- China –
  - Xi Jinping — General Secretary of the CCP, Chairman of the CMC and President of China
  - Peng Liyuan — First Lady of China
  - Li Keqiang — Premier of China
  - Cai Qi — Party Secretary of Beijing, CCP Politburo member and Chairman of the Beijing 2022 Organizing Committee
  - Chen Jining — Mayor of Beijing

=== International dignitaries ===
- Chinese Taipei − Wu Cherng-dean, Chairperson of the New Party
- Italy − Giuseppe Sala, Mayor of Milan
- Italy − Gianpietro Ghedina, Mayor of Cortina d'Ampezzo

=== Heads of international organizations ===
- International Olympic Committee⁣ – ⁣Thomas Bach, President of the International Olympic Committee

== Anthems ==
- National Anthem of China
- National Anthem of Greece – London Symphony Orchestra
- (International Olympic Committee) Olympic Anthem – Sang by the Malanhua'er Children's Choir in Greek
- National Anthem of Italy – Sang by Malika Ayane and played on violin by Giovanni Andrea Zanon

=== Victory ceremonies ===
- National Anthem of Norway – London Symphony Orchestra (Note: Anthem played as part of the Women's 30km mass start free victory ceremony.)
- (Russia) Piano Concerto No. 1 by Pyotr Ilyich Tchaikovsky – London Symphony Orchestra (Note: Anthem played as part of the Men's 50km mass start free victory ceremony. This event was shortened to 30km due to high winds and freezing temperature.)

== See also ==
- 2008 Summer Olympics opening ceremony
- 2008 Summer Olympics closing ceremony
- 2022 Winter Olympics opening ceremony
- 2022 Winter Paralympics opening ceremony
- 2022 Winter Paralympics closing ceremony
