= 2022 Winter Olympics opening ceremony =

- Part of 2022 Winter Olympics
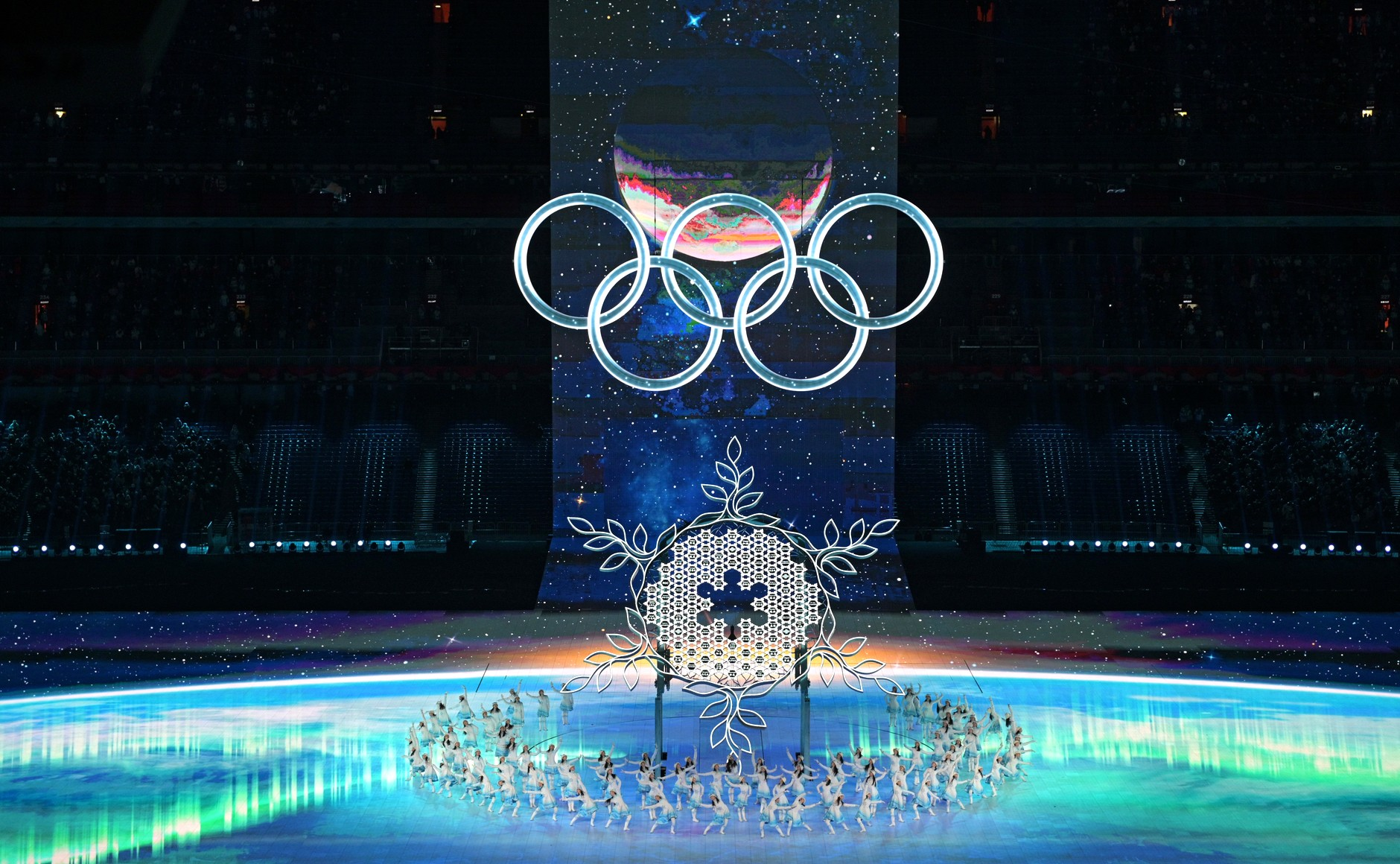
- The cauldron of the games
- Date: 4 February 2022; 4 years ago
- Time: 20:00–22:25 CST (UTC+8)
- Venue: Beijing National Stadium
- Location: Beijing, China; 39°59′30″N 116°23′26″E
- Theme: One World, One Family
- Filmed by: Olympic Broadcasting Services (OBS)
- Footage: 2022 Winter Games Opening Ceremony in Olympic Channel on YouTube

The opening ceremony of the 2022 Winter Olympics was held at Beijing National Stadium, China on 4 February 2022. As mandated by the Olympic Charter, the proceedings combined the formal and ceremonial opening of this international sporting event, including welcoming speeches, hoisting of the flags and the parade of athletes, with an artistic spectacle to showcase the host nation's winter culture and modern history. The Games were officially opened by Xi Jinping, general secretary of the Chinese Communist Party and president of China.

The opening ceremony was directed by film director and producer Zhang Yimou, who has previously directed the opening and closing ceremonies of the 2008 Summer Olympics, which was China's first time hosting the Olympics.

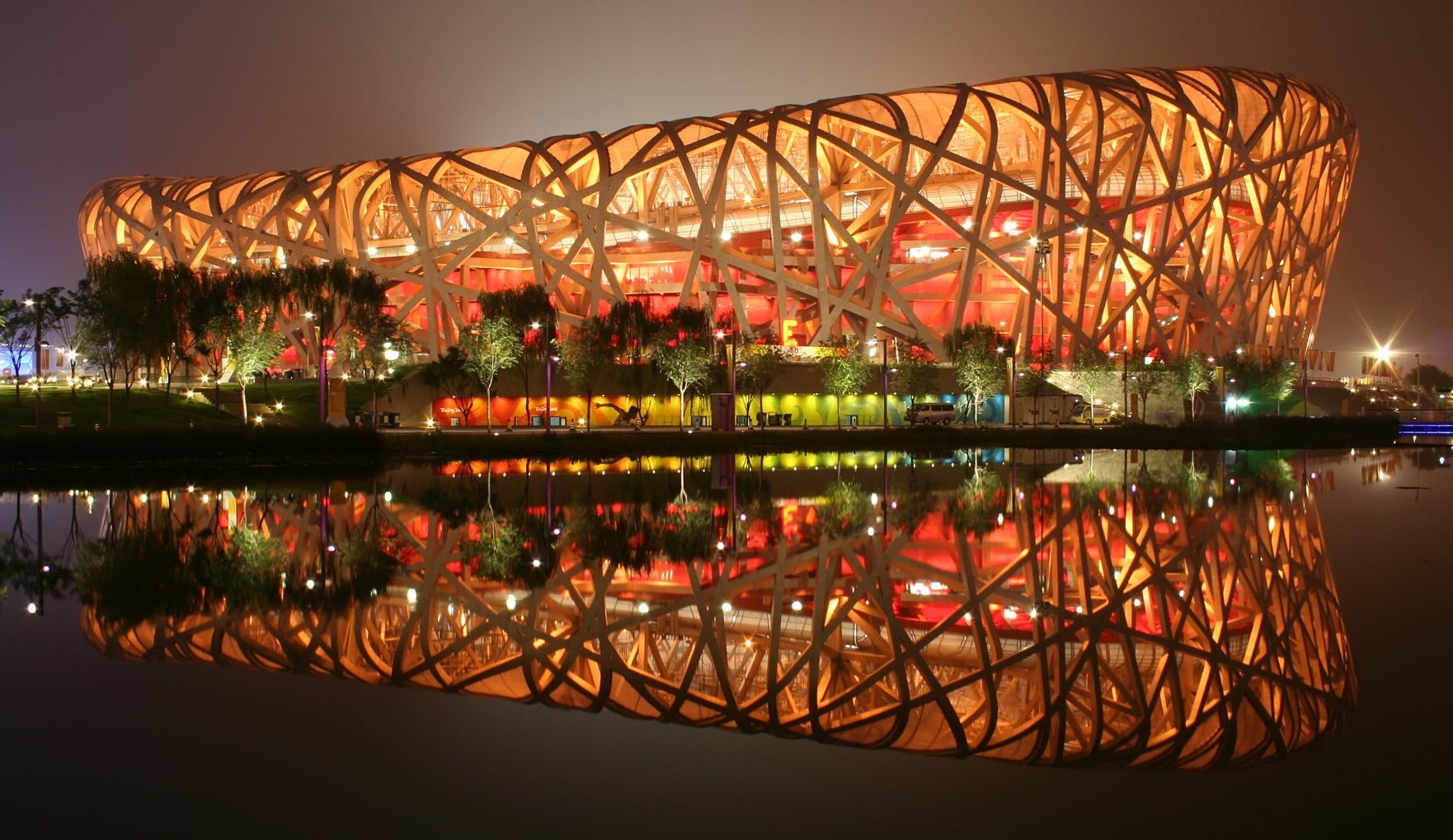
Beijing National Stadium

The world's largest LED screen (10,552 square metres (113,580 ft^{2}) and using 40,000 LED modules) was unveiled at the opening ceremony.

The ceremony was also marked by diplomatic boycotts from certain countries among other concerns and controversies.

== Ceremony key team ==
- Zhang Yimou – Opening Ceremony Director

Announcers

- Qiao Dongzhuo – French
- Ji Xiaojun – English
- Bao Xiaofeng – Mandarin Chinese

== Theme and concept ==
The themes of the opening ceremony are:

- China's yearning for and willingness to pursue world peace
- Olympic motto "faster, higher, stronger – together"
- Beijing Winter Games' slogan of "Together for a shared future"

As stated by Zhang Yimou, in an Olympic first, all of the segments along with the International Olympic Committee protocols, were merged into one integrated programme in the opening ceremony.

== Preparations ==
The final stage in preparations for the event and performance stages at the Bird's Nest were completed in October. A full-scale dress rehearsal was held on 22 January 2022, with approximately 4000 participants featuring in it.

== Proceedings ==
A 30-minute pre-show performance kicked off at 19:25, featuring square dancers aged from five to over 70 years old. Apart from the live performances, people from other Chinese cities joined the pre-show performances through video recording. The pre-show performance was performed primarily by residents of Beijing and Hebei Province, showcasing the passion of the Chinese people in welcoming the Olympic Winter Games.

At 20:00, the words "过年好" (guònián hǎo, lit. "Happy New Year") and "Happy Chinese New Year" appeared on the stage after the 30-minute long performances, symbolizing China's hospitality and celebrations of the traditional Chinese festival.

Chinese paramount leader Xi Jinping, Chinese First Lady Peng Liyuan, IOC President Thomas Bach, international dignitaries and various Chinese government officials arrived at the stadium before the official start of the ceremony, receiving huge cheers and welcome from the crowds and the performers from the pre-show performances.

=== Rites of spring: Countdown performance ===
The ceremony began with a 24-second countdown, which represented the 24th Winter Olympics as well as the 24 solar terms in the Chinese calendar, where Lichun (ecliptic longitude 315°), Feb 4, is generally regarded as the "Beginning of spring". After the countdown, dancers carried tall and flexible glowing green stalks, showing the lifecycle of the dandelion, which eventually turned white and floated up into the sky as the seeds dispersed, followed by fireworks displaying the words "立春" (lìchūn, lit. "the beginning of spring") and "Spring", celebrating the beginning of spring. At the beginning of the ceremony, a film about Dundbulag rock carvings from Altay in the Altay Prefecture was shown. Skiing is likely to originate from Altay per the 2015 Altay Declaration made by scholars from 18 countries.

Chinese President Xi Jinping and IOC President Thomas Bach were then introduced by the MCs, receiving warm welcome from the crowds again.

=== Entry of the National flag ===
Zhu De'en, a trumpeter, played a patriotic Chinese song "My People, My Country". Twelve children lifted the national flag of China and entered the stadium, symbolizing the legacy of Beijing 2008 opening ceremony. They then passed the national flag to a line of representatives from different strata of society and 56 ethnic groups of China, symbolizing national unity and the deep relationships between the national flag and the citizens. The representatives then handed over the flag to 8 PLAGF Honor Guard soldiers, who then unfurled and raised the flag while the crowd sang the Chinese national anthem.

=== Olympic Rings Reveal ===
The Olympic Rings performance began with the giant LED screens showing a drop of ink that had fallen from the sky, turning into seething, rolling waves of the Yellow River, from which an ice cube crystallizes. 24 "laser beams" sequentially "carve" the names of cities and countries of 23 previous Winter Olympics in Chinese and English on this cube. The 24th was shown when the rays merged into a single beam, which "cut out" "2022 BEIJING CHINA". Six hockey players then entered the stadium and swung at a massive LED hockey puck. It flew into the cube, slowly fracturing it as the five ice Olympic rings rose from inside. Next, a Chinese ice door opened behind them, and athletes began to enter the parade of nations.

=== Parade of nations ===
Following the formation of the ice Olympic Rings, greetings appeared in the stadium in many languages of the world. Per tradition, the national team of Greece, the country of origin of Olympics marched first. The country that will host the next Winter Olympics, Italy, marched before the host nation, China, which entered last. The patriotic song "Ode to the Motherland" was played when China entered the stadium. Other teams, in the same practice of the opening ceremony of the 2008 Summer Olympics, entered in a collation method based on their countries names as written in Simplified Chinese characters and is similar to that used in Chinese dictionaries. The names were sorted by the number of strokes in the first character of the name, then by the stroke order of the character (in the stroke count method order), then the number of strokes and stroke order of the second character, then next character and so on. In front of each country's delegation, a Chinese representative carried a snowflake-shaped sign with the name of the delegation in both English and Chinese. After the parade, all such "snowflakes" of the participating delegations formed a large "snowflake" to symbolise the world coming together.

Background music used during the parade of nations:

1. Gioachino Rossini: William Tell Overture
2. Edward Elgar: "Pomp and Circumstance" March No. 1 in D
3. Tchaikovsky: "The Reed Dance" and "March" in The Nutcracker
4. Johann Sebastian Bach: Orchestral Suite No. 3 in D, "Gigue"
5. Giuseppe Verdi: "The Triumph March" from "Aida"
6. Johann Strauss II: Voices of Spring Waltz
7. Ludwig van Beethoven: "Turkish March" from "The Ruins of Athens"
8. Ludwig van Beethoven: Symphony No. 5 in C minor "Fate", fourth movement
9. Mikhail Glinka: Overture to Ruslan and Lyudmila
10. Giuseppe Verdi: Libiamo ne' lieti calici
11. Georges Bizet: Carmen Overture
12. Johannes Brahms: Hungarian Dance No. 5 in G minor
13. Émile Waldteufel: The Skaters' Waltz
14. Franz von Suppé: Light Cavalry Overture
15. Antonio Vivaldi: The first movement of "Spring" in "Four Seasons"
16. Wolfgang Amadeus Mozart: Symphony No. 40 in G minor, first movement
17. Antonín Dvořák: Symphony No. 9 in E minor "From the New World", fourth movement
18. Tchaikovsky: Danse des petits cygnes
19. Wang Shen: Ode to the Motherland (歌唱祖国) (Gēchàng Zǔguó) - China's entry

=== Opening of the Olympic Games ===
Cai Qi, President of the Beijing 2022 organizing committee delivered a speech to thank and welcome the athletes, offering words of peace and unity. IOC President Thomas Bach then gave his speech in which he thanked China for being gracious hosts and also extended gratitude to those on the doctors and nurses combating the global COVID-19 pandemic. Bach urged world leaders to "give peace a chance" amid the traditional Olympic truce and instructed athletes to "show how the world would look like, if we all respect the same rules and each other". He also called for the end of various types of discrimination, especially against Asians worldwide.

On IOC President Thomas Bach's invitation, Chinese President Xi Jinping declared the 2022 Winter Olympics in Beijing officially open.

Chinese: “我宣布，北京第24届冬季奥林匹克运动会...开幕！”; pinyin: Wǒ xuānbù, běijīng dì èrshísì jiè dōngjì àolínpǐkè yùndònghuì...kāimù; lit. 'I declare the XXIV Olympic Winter Games of Beijing ... open!'

— Xi Jinping, President of China

Fireworks then shined the sky, forming the shape of a "Welcome Pine", one of the symbols of the Huangshan, symbolizing China's warm welcome to guests from all over the world.

=== Tribute to the People ===
The performance began by a group of young people consisted of local and foreign university students, walking on the stage with the Chinese song "Let the World be Filled with Love" (让世界充满爱, Ràng shìjiè chōngmǎn ài) sung in the background. After they walked past the stage, the slogan "Together for a shared future" (一起向未来, Yīqǐ xiàng wèilái) in both English and Chinese appeared. Later, a group of ice skaters on the LED floor, carving out paths for them to follow, all to the theme of John Lennon's "Imagine" cover song The Olympic motto "Faster, Higher, Stronger - Together" (Chinese: 更快、更高、更强、更团结; pinyin: Gèng kuài, gèng gāo, gèng qiáng, gèng tuánjié; lit. 'Faster', 'higher', 'stronger', 'more united') also in both English and Chinese then appeared.

=== Olympic Flag Entry and Raising ===
The Olympic Flag entered into the stadium. The flag bearers were:

- Luo Zhihuan (罗致焕), China's first speed skating world champion in the 1963 World Championships and China's first world champion in winter sports
- Li Jiajun (李佳军), Chinese short track speed skater, silver medalist at 1998 Winter Olympics & 2002 Winter Olympics, bronze medalist at 2006 Winter Olympics.
- Shen Xue (申雪), Chinese figure skating pairs skater, 2010 Winter Olympic gold medalist.
- Han Xiaopeng (韩晓鹏), Chinese freestyle skier, 2006 Winter Olympics gold medalist.
- Zhang Hui (张会), Chinese short track speed skater, 2010 Winter Olympics gold medalist.
- Zhang Hong (张虹), Chinese speed skater, 2014 Winter Olympics gold medalist, IOC member

The Olympic Anthem was sung in Greek by the Malanhua'er Children's Choir, a choir of 44 children from the mountains of Fuping County, Baoding, Hebei Province.

=== Oath taking ===
Cross-country skier Wang Qiang and snowboard halfpipe athlete Liu Jiayu represented the athletes sworn the Olympic oath, while aerials judge Tao Yongchun and head of the Chinese coaching team in snowboard parallel giant slalom Ji Xiao'ou represented judges and coaches, respectively.

"We promise to take part in these Olympic Games, respecting and abiding by the rules and in the spirit of fair play, inclusion and quality. Together we stand in solidarity and commit ourselves to sport without doping, without cheating, without any form of discrimination. We do this for the honour of our teams, in respect for the Fundamental Principles of Olympism, and to make the world a better place through sport."

After the Olympic vows, a short film "Champions of Tomorrow" was shown on the screen of the stadium, showing toddlers taking their first steps in winter sports, set to the rendition of Chinese nursery rhyme Two Tigers. Although the toddlers fell over and over again, they did not lose heart and persisted.

=== Snowflakes performance ===
In the performance, hundreds of children wandered around the center stage singing the theme song of the ceremony titled “Snowflake”. The LED floor beneath them used large-scale motion capture to illuminate glows of snowflakes and stars under their feet. The children played happily, holding dove lamps and lanterns, leaving trails of glittering snowflakes as they went. As the song and dance came to a close, the children surrounded a massive snowflake in a heart-shaped formation while singing. The large snowflake consisted of 91 snowflake-shaped placards used for each participating country during the "Parade of Nations". The snowflake theme ran through the entire ceremony representing solidarity and prosperity.

=== Arrival and lighting of the Olympic flame ===
At 22:10, the Olympic Flame from Olympia reached the stadium. After the Olympic anthem, it was passed around the stadium by five athletes born in the 1950s (Zhao Weichang), 1960s (Li Yan), 1970s (Yang Yang (A)), 1980s (Su Bingtian) and 1990s (Zhou Yang). The final torch-runners were two athletes born in the 2000s: Skier Dinigeer Yilamujiang and Nordic mixed skier Zhao Jiawen, who fitted the torch carrying Olympic flame in the center of the large "snowflake" engraved with the names of the 91 countries competing. For the first time in Olympic history the passing torch itself formed the main flame of the Olympic cauldron, known as a "microflame" (微火, Wéi huǒ). Director Zhang Yimou stated that the tiny flame symbolised environmental sustainability and set the standards for a "carbon-neutral" game.

The following were the seven final torch-runners:

- Zhao Weichang (赵伟昌): speed skater, first Country's flagbearer during Opening Ceremony of 1980 Winter Olympics.
- Li Yan (李琰): short track speed skater, first Chinese to won an Olympic Gold medal during 1988 Winter Olympics short track speed skating demonstration event, Silver medalist at 1992 Winter Olympics, former head coach of China's national short track speed skating team (2006–2019), current chairman of Chinese Skating Association (CSA) (2017-now).
- Yang Yang (A) (杨扬): Chinese short track speed skater, first Chinese to win an official gold medal at the 2002 Winter Olympics and retained the title four years later, six-time Overall World Champion for 1997–2002, current vice president of World Anti-Doping Agency (WADA).
  - Beijing 2022 marks Yang Yang's second appearance in an Olympic Games opening ceremony. She had the same role during the Beijing 2008 when she carried the Olympic flag alongside seven former Chinese athletes.Yang's selection reflects Beijing's Olympic duality as the first city in history to host both versions of the Olympic Games.
- Su Bingtian (苏炳添): Chinese sprinter, 2020 Olympian, bronze medalist in Men's 4 × 100 meters relay and first Chinese finalist at the Men's 100 metres at those Games, current holder of the 100 m Asian record (9.827 s, +0.9 m/s, Tokyo, Japan)
- Zhou Yang (周洋): Chinese short track speed skater, the first Chinese athlete to win three-time Olympic golds during the 2010 Winter Olympics and 2014 Winter Olympics.
  - Beijing 2022 marked Zhou Yang's second appearance in an Olympic Games opening ceremony. She was also a torchbearer during 2014 Summer Youth Olympics opening ceremony held in Nanjing.
- The last two torch runners:
  - Dinigeer Yilamujiang (迪妮格尔·衣拉木江): cross-country skier from Altay, representing the place where skiing was probably born. Nordic skier, she was the first Chinese athlete in history to qualify directly for Cross-Country Skiing at the Winter Olympics. Dinigeer became the first Uyghur skier and the first athlete from Altay City to qualify directly for the Olympics.
  - Zhao Jiawen (赵嘉文)

Due to the backlash China received for the persecution of Uyghurs in China, several Western media outlets speculated about the message China was intending to send with Dilnigeer's selection.

== Anthems ==
- National Anthem of China
- (International Olympic Committee) Olympic Anthem – Sang by the Malanhua'er Children's Choir.

== Dignitaries in attendance ==
=== Host nation ===
- China –
  - Xi Jinping, General Secretary of the Chinese Communist Party, President of China and Chairman of the Central Military Commission and First Lady Peng Liyuan
  - Li Keqiang, Premier of China
  - Cai Qi, Communist Party Secretary of Beijing, Executive President of Beijing 2022

=== International ===
Heads of government and state

- Argentina – Alberto Fernandez, President of Argentina
- Bosnia and Herzegovina – Zoran Tegeltija, Chairman of the Council of Ministers of Bosnia and Herzegovina
- Ecuador – Guillermo Lasso, President of Ecuador
- Egypt – Abdel Fattah el-Sisi, President of Egypt
- Kazakhstan – Kassym-Jomart Tokayev, President of Kazakhstan
- Kyrgyzstan – Sadyr Japarov, President of Kyrgyzstan
- Macau SAR – Ho Iat-seng, Chief Executive of Macau
- Mongolia – Luvsannamsrain Oyun-Erdene, Prime Minister of Mongolia
- Pakistan – Imran Khan, Prime Minister of Pakistan and Fahmida Mirza, Minister for Inter-provincial Coordination (IPC)
- Papua New Guinea — James Marape, Prime Minister of Papua New Guinea
- Poland – Andrzej Duda, President of Poland
- Russia – Vladimir Putin, President of Russia
- Serbia – Aleksandar Vučić, President of Serbia
- Singapore – Halimah Yacob, President of Singapore
- Tajikistan – Emomali Rahmon, President of Tajikistan
- Turkmenistan – Gurbanguly Berdimuhamedow, President of Turkmenistan
- Uzbekistan – Shavkat Mirziyoyev, President of Uzbekistan

Heads of international organizations

- International Olympic Committee⁣ – ⁣Thomas Bach, President of the International Olympic Committee
- United Nations⁣ – ⁣António Guterres, Secretary-General of the United Nations
- United Nations⁣ – ⁣Abdulla Shahid, President of the United Nations General Assembly
- World Health Organization – Tedros Adhanom Ghebreyesus, Director-General of the World Health Organization
- (United Nations) World Intellectual Property Organization – Daren Tang, Secretary-General of the World Intellectual Property Organization
- Shanghai Cooperation Organisation – Zhang Ming, Secretary-General of Shanghai Cooperation Organisation
- Brazil and New Development Bank – Marcos Prado Troyjo, president of New Development Bank

Royalty

- Cambodia – Norodom Sihamoni, King of Cambodia
- Saudi Arabia – Mohammed bin Salman, Crown Prince of Saudi Arabia, Prince Abdulaziz bin Turki Al Saud, Minister of Sports, Princess Reema bint Bandar Al Saud (also Saudi Ambassador to the USA), Prince Fahd bin Jalawi bin Abdulaziz bin Musaed, Vice President of the Saudi Arabian Olympic Committee and Adwa Al-Oraifi, member of the Saudi Olympic and Paralympic Committee
- United Arab Emirates – Mohamed bin Zayed Al Nahyan, Crown Prince of Abu Dhabi
- Luxembourg – Henri, Grand Duke of Luxembourg
- Monaco – Albert II, Prince of Monaco
- Qatar – Tamim bin Hamad Al Thani, Emir of Qatar
- Thailand – Sirindhorn, Princess Royal of Thailand (representing the King of Thailand)

Others

- Azerbaijan – Ali Ahmadov, Deputy Prime Minister of the Republic of Azerbaijan
- Japan – Seiko Hashimoto, president of the Tokyo 2020 Olympic and Paralympics Organizing Committee; Yasuhiro Yamashita, president of the Japanese Olympic Committee and Kazuyuki Mori, chief of the Japanese Paralympic Committee (host country of the 2020 Summer Olympics)
- Chinese Taipei – Hung Hsiu-chu, Former chairperson of the Kuomintang and former Vice President of the Legislative Yuan
- France – Roxana Mărăcineanu, Minister Delegate in charge of Sports
- South Korea – Hwang Hee, Ministry of Culture, Sports and Tourism, and Park Byeong-seug, Speaker of the National Assembly of South Korea
- Romania – Carol-Eduard Novak, Minister of Youth and Sport

== Viewership ==
In the United States, NBC's live broadcast of the ceremony was the lowest watched opening ceremony in U.S. history. 16 million people watched the event while a further 190 million minutes were streamed on Peacock, NBC's over-the-top video streaming service. Some reasons for the low audience figures included "strained relations between the United States and China due to economic and human rights issues, another Olympics held during the COVID-19 pandemic, and a lack of buzz coming into the Games."

== Controversy and concerns ==
=== Taiwan's participation ===
On 26 January 2022, a spokesperson of China's Taiwan Affairs Office "incorrectly" called the Chinese Taipei (Taiwan) team "Taipei, China". Later that day, Taiwan announced that their Olympic team would not attend the opening and closing ceremonies in Beijing, formally due to anti-COVID-19 rules and delayed flights. The same day, another Taiwan official stated that Taiwan would be diplomatically boycotting the ceremonies as well. On 28 January 2022, a Taiwan official also stated concern that the Chinese Taipei (中华台北) and Hong Kong, China (中国香港) delegations would be adjacent to each other in the Parade of Nations due to the Chinese collation order, "downgrading" Taiwan's status.

Between 29 January and 31 January 2022, the International Olympic Committee repeatedly contacted the Chinese Taipei Olympic Committee, stating that it was obligated to attend the ceremonies to "comply with the Olympic Charter". (The IOC had already suspended North Korea for not sending a team to the Tokyo Summer Games in violation of the Olympic Charter.) On 1 February 2022, Taiwanese officials relented on their boycott. According to attendees of the rehearsal of the opening ceremony, Japan and Chinese Taipei marched adjacently, followed by "a few" countries, followed by Hong Kong, preventing the Chinese Taipei and Hong Kong delegations from being adjacent. However, during the actual opening ceremony, Japan, Chinese Taipei, and Hong Kong marched adjacently in that order.

On China's state media, the broadcast of the opening ceremony cut away to a clip of Xi Jinping when the Chinese Taipei delegation paraded, while the broadcast's commentator announced the delegation's name as "Taipei, China".

=== Hanbok controversy ===
Some South Korean people were angered and accused China of appropriating Korean culture as their own, as one of the performers representing the ethnic Koreans in China wore a traditional choson-ot when delivering the national flag of China. Democratic Party presidential nominee Lee Jae-myung, People Power Party presidential nominee Yoon Suk-yeol, People's Party presidential candidate Ahn Cheol-soo joined the fray and expressed their discontent. However some South Koreans felt their politicians' reactions were misguided, and say that it was clear to them, that the woman was representing the estimated 2 million ethnic Koreans who live in China. The Chinese Embassy in South Korea responded that China respected the historical and cultural traditions of South Korea, and hanbok belongs to ethnic Koreans everywhere, including in China.

== See also ==
- 2008 Summer Olympics opening ceremony
- 2008 Summer Olympics closing ceremony
- 2022 Winter Olympics closing ceremony
- 2022 Winter Paralympics opening ceremony
- 2022 Winter Paralympics closing ceremony
