= Li Wei (politician, born 1963) =

Chinese politician

- 李伟

Vice Chairman of the Beijing Municipal Committee of the Chinese People's Political Consultative Conference
- In office January 2018 – August 2020
- Chairman: Ji Lin

Personal details
- Born: May 1963 (age 63) Beijing, China
- Party: Chinese Communist Party (1987–2021; expelled)
- Education: Minzu University of China

Chinese name
- Simplified Chinese: 李伟
- Traditional Chinese: 李偉
Transcriptions
Standard Mandarin
- Hanyu Pinyin: Lǐ Wěi

Li Wei (Chinese: 李伟; born May 1963) is a former Chinese politician who served as vice chairman of the Beijing Municipal Committee of the Chinese People's Political Consultative Conference. He was investigated by China's top anti-graft agency in August 2020.

== Biography ==
Born in Beijing in May 1963, he graduated from Minzu University of China. He entered the workforce in December 1982, and joined the Chinese Communist Party in January 1987. In 2008, he was one of the spokespersons for the 2008 Summer Olympics, responsible for introducing the operation of Beijing, including transportation, environmental protection, coal, water, electricity and other aspects. In February 2013, he rose to become secretary-general of Beijing Municipal People's Government, concurrently holding the position of party branch secretary and director of the General Office of the Beijing Municipal People's Government. In January 2018, he was promoted again to become vice chairman of the Beijing Municipal Committee of the Chinese People's Political Consultative Conference, Beijing's top political advisory body.

== Downfall ==
On 25 August 2020, he was put under investigation for alleged "serious violations of discipline and laws" by the Central Commission for Discipline Inspection (CCDI), the party's internal disciplinary body, and the National Supervisory Commission, the highest anti-corruption agency of China. Before he stepped down, his subordinate Lin Xiangyang (林向阳; deputy secretary-general of Beijing Municipal People's Government) was sacked for graft in mid August 2020. Another subordinate Wang Xiaoming (王晓明; deputy secretary-general of Beijing Municipal People's Government) fell to death in May 2018.

On 11 January 2021, he was expelled from the Chinese Communist Party (CCP) and removed from public office, and was transferred to the procuratorates. On September 7, he stood trial for taking bribes at the No.2 Intermediate People's Court of Tianjin. Prosecutors accused Li of taking advantage of his positions in Beijing between 2001 and 2019 to help some organizations and individuals in real estate development and coal transactions. In return, he accepted money and valuables worth 32.96 million yuan (about 5.11 million U.S. dollars).

On 18 March 2022, he was sentenced to 9 years in prison on taking bribes and fine of one million yuan, and his illegal gains will be confiscated and his case transferred to the judiciary.
