= Ji Lin (politician) =

Chinese politician

- 吉林

Chairman of the Beijing People’s Political Consultative Conference
- In office 25 January 2013 – January 2022
- Party Secretary: Guo Jinlong; Cai Qi
- Preceded by: Wang Anshun
- Succeeded by: Wei Xiaodong

Personal details
- Born: April 1962 (age 64) Shanghai
- Party: Chinese Communist Party
- Education: Renmin University of China

Ji Lin (Chinese: 吉林; born April 1962) is a Chinese politician. He served as the Chairman of the Beijing Committee of the Chinese People's Political Consultative Conference and the Chinese Communist Party Committee Secretary and first vice president of the Central Institute of Socialism.

== Biography ==
Born in Shanghai, Ji graduated from Renmin University of China school of law, specializing in criminal law. He joined the Chinese Communist Party (CCP) in July 1987. After graduating, he became a functionary with the Communist Youth League, eventually leading the organization's arm at his alma mater. In August 1994 he was named deputy Communist Youth League Secretary of Beijing, promoted a year later to Secretary. In October 1998, he took on the post of party chief of Miyun County. In June 2002 he was named head of the Political and Legal Affairs Commission of Beijing and a member of the municipal Party Standing Committee, ascending to sub-provincial ranks at the age of only 40. In 2004 he was named vice mayor of Beijing. In 2007, he was named executive vice mayor of Beijing. In June 2012, he was named CCP Deputy Committee Secretary of Beijing.

On January 25, 2013, Ji Lin was named Chairman of the Beijing Committee of the Chinese People's Political Consultative Conference. At the time he was the second youngest CPPCC provincial-level chair in the country, next to Nurlan Abilmazhinuly.

Ji is an alternate of the 17th, 18th and 20th Central Committee of the Chinese Communist Party.

Party political offices
Preceded by Wang Anshun	Deputy Party Secretary of Beijing; 2012–2013	Succeeded by Lü Xiwen
Political offices
Preceded by Wang Anshun	Chairman of the Beijing CPPCC Committee; 2013–2022	Succeeded by Wei Xiaodong
