= Guo Jinlong =

Chinese politician (born 1947)

- 郭金龙
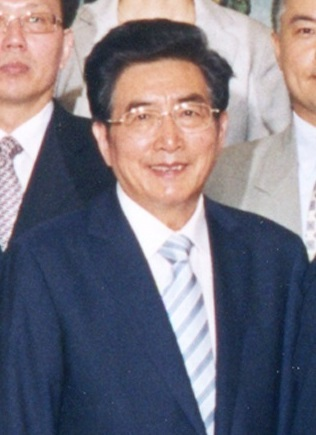

Party Secretary of Beijing
- In office July 3, 2012 – May 27, 2017
- Deputy: Wang Anshun (mayor); Cai Qi (mayor)
- Preceded by: Liu Qi
- Succeeded by: Cai Qi

Mayor of Beijing
- In office January 26, 2008 – July 25, 2012
- Party Secretary: Liu Qi
- Preceded by: Wang Qishan
- Succeeded by: Wang Anshun

President of the Beijing Organizing Committee for the 2022 Olympic and Paralympic Winter Games
- In office December 15, 2015 – June 9, 2017
- IOC president: Thomas Bach
- Succeeded by: Cai Qi

Chair of the Beijing Organizing Committee for the 2022 Olympic and Paralympic Winter Games
- In office December 15, 2015 – June 9, 2017
- Preceded by: Committee established
- Succeeded by: Cai Qi

Personal details
- Born: July 1947 (age 79) Nanjing, Jiangsu, China
- Party: Chinese Communist Party (1979–present)
- Education: Nanjing University

Chinese name
- Simplified Chinese: 郭金龙
- Traditional Chinese: 郭金龍
Transcriptions
Standard Mandarin
- Hanyu Pinyin: Guō Jīnlóng

Guo Jinlong (Chinese: 郭金龙; born July 1947) is a Chinese politician, who served as the Vice Chairman of the Central Guidance Commission on Building Spiritual Civilization, and was a member of the Politburo of the Chinese Communist Party. Between 2008 and 2012 Guo served as the Mayor of Beijing, and Party Secretary of Beijing between 2012 and 2017. As the Mayor of Beijing during the 2008 Olympics, Guo served as the executive chairman of the Beijing Organizing Committee for the Olympic Games (BOCOG).

Before his career in Beijing, Guo served as the Party Secretary of the Tibet Autonomous Region between 2000 and 2004, and CCP Committee Secretary of Anhui Province from 2004 to 2007.

== Life and career ==
=== Sichuan ===
Guo Jinlong was born in Nanjing, Jiangsu. From 1964 to 1969, he studied at the Physics Department of Nanjing University, majoring in acoustics, and joined the workforce in August 1969. From 1970 to 1973, he served as a cadre in the Electricity Unit of the Water and Electricity Bureau of Zhong County, Sichuan Province. From 1973 to 1979, he served as a coach in the Physical Culture Committee of Zhong County. He joined the Chinese Communist Party (CCP) in April 1979. From 1979 to 1980, he served as a theoretical instructor in the Publicity Department of the Zhong County Committee of the CCP. In 1980, he served as deputy director of the Bureau of Literature and Education of Zhong County. In 1981, he served as director of the Bureau of Culture of Zhong County, Sichuan Province. In 1983, he served as deputy secretary of the CCP Zhong County Committee and governor of Zhong County.

From 1985 to 1987, he served as deputy director of the Rural Policy Research Office of the CCP Sichuan Provincial Committee and deputy director of the Sichuan Rural Economy Committee. From 1987 to 1990, he served as deputy secretary of the CCP Leshan Municipal Committee. From 1990 to 1992, he served as secretary of the CCP Leshan Municipal Committee. From October 1992 to 1993, he served as a standing member of the CCP Sichuan Provincial Committee. In 1993, he became the Deputy Secretary of the CCP Sichuan Provincial Committee.

=== Tibet ===
In December 1993, Guo left Sichuan, where he had worked for over twenty years, and headed to Lhasa to serve as the Deputy Party Secretary of the CCP Tibet Autonomous Region, and was promoted to become the Secretary from 2000 to 2004. As the leading official in Tibet at the time, Guo played a leading role in the Qinghai-Tibet Railway project. In October 2000, the fifth plenary session of the fifteenth CCP Central Committee held in Beijing, the theme of which was to study the proposals for the Tenth Five-Year Plan, and on October 10, during a group discussion, Guo Jinlong argued for the inclusion of the construction of the Qinghai-Tibet Railway in China's Tenth Five-Year Plan.

=== Anhui ===
He left Tibet to serve as the party chief of Anhui province in 2004, and Chairman of the Standing Committee of Anhui People's Congress from 2005. In 2004, Anhui's political scene was in turmoil, starting with the execution of former Anhui vice-governor Wang Huaizhong for embezzlement and selling officials, followed by the nationwide attention given to the fake milk powder incident in Fuyang. Because of this, Guo Jinlong's appointment was met with high expectations. He spent the first six months of his tenure conducting research in various places, and he lived in a guest house with his family for about half-year.

=== Beijing ===
After the departure of Wang Qishan from his post as Mayor of Beijing, Guo headed north from Anhui to take over the position as Acting mayor on November 30, 2007, confirmed on January 26, 2008. He served as Executive President of the Beijing Organizing Committee for the 2008 Summer Olympics. On July 3, 2012, a few months before the 18th Party Congress, Guo was named party chief of Beijing. At the party congress held in November, Guo was elevated to the 25-member Politburo of the Chinese Communist Party. During Guo Jinlong's presidency of Beijing, the city successfully won the right to host the XXIV Winter Olympic Games on July 31, 2015.

On May 27, 2017, Guo left his post of Beijing party chief to Cai Qi. He was then duly appointed the Vice Chairman of the Central Guidance Commission on Building Spiritual Civilization.

Guo was the alternate member of 15th CCP Central Committee and member of 16th, 17th, and 18th Central Committees. Due to age restrictions Guo retired at the 19th National Congress of the Chinese Communist Party in 2017.

Assembly seats
Preceded by Wang Taihua	Chairman of Anhui People's Congress; 2005–2007	Succeeded by Wang Jinshan
Government offices
Preceded by Wang Qishan	Mayor of Beijing; 2007–2012 (acting until 2008)	Succeeded by Wang Anshun
Party political offices
Preceded by Chen Kuiyuan	Party Secretary of Tibet; 2000–2004	Succeeded by Yang Chuantang
Preceded by Wang Taihua	Party Secretary of Anhui; 2004–2007	Succeeded by Wang Jinshan
Preceded by Liu Qi	Party Secretary of Beijing; 2012–2017	Succeeded by Cai Qi
Winter Olympics
Preceded by None	President of Organizing Committee for Winter Olympic Games; 2015–2017	Succeeded by (China) Cai Qi
