= Xi Jinping Thought on Party Building =

Ideological policies of China

Xi Jinping Thought on Party Building (Chinese: 习近平党建思想) is the doctrine of the Chinese Communist Party regarding Party building. It is a part of the larger Xi Jinping Thought, which is derived from the speeches of general secretary of the Chinese Communist Party Xi Jinping. It was established during the National Conference on Party Building, held in June 2026.

== History ==
General Secretary Xi Jinping's Important Thoughts on Party Building was during the National Organizational Work Conference in June 2023, focusing on "what kind of long-term ruling Marxist party to build and how to build such a party". It was summarized to the thirteen adherences. Xi Jinping Thought on Party Building was put forward at the National Conference on Party building on 15 June 2026. The meeting was chaired by Politburo Standing Committee member Cai Qi and was also attended by Li Xi.

== Content ==
According to the Xinhua News Agency, the doctrine is summarized in the "14 upholds", namely "upholding:"

1. "the leadership of the Party is the most essential feature of socialism with Chinese characteristics"
2. "the centralized and unified leadership of the Party Central Committee"
3. "comprehensive and strict Party governance"
4. "the original aspiration and mission firmly in mind"
5. "the Party's political construction as the guiding principle"
6. "the use of the Party's innovative theories to unite and inspire the people"
7. "the cultivation of strong Party spirit"
8. "the improvement of a well-connected and effective organizational system"
9. "building of a high-quality cadre team capable of shouldering the heavy responsibility of national rejuvenation"
10. "the normalization and long-term effectiveness of style construction"
11. "the use of strict discipline to govern the entire Party; upholding the integrated approach of
12. "not daring to be corrupt, not being able to be corrupt, and not wanting to be corrupt"
13. "the governance of the Party by institutions and regulations"
14. "the implementation of the political responsibility of governing the Party"
