= My People, My Country (song) =

"我和我的祖国"

Song by Li Guyi

from the album My People, My Country
- Language: Chinese
- English title: My People, My Country
- Released: January 1984
- Genre: Popular music
- Length: 3:30
- Label: China Audio-Video Publishing House
- Composer: Qin Yongcheng (秦咏诚)
- Lyricist: Zhang Li (张藜)

"My People, My Country" (simplified Chinese: 我和我的祖国; traditional Chinese: 我和我的祖國, literal translation Me and My Motherland/My Motherland and I) is a patriotic song of the People's Republic of China that debuted in 1985. The song was composed by Qin Yongcheng of the Shenyang Conservatory of Music. The lyrics, written by Zhang Li, are expressed in the first person, depicting one's love for the motherland. The song was circulated widely after being sung by the prominent Chinese singer Li Guyi, and remains one of the most popular songs in the country. On the occasion of the 70th anniversary of the founding of the People's Republic of China, "Me and My Motherland" was sung all over the country. The song has been shortlisted as one of 100 patriotic songs recommended by the Central Propaganda Department, and of 100 excellent songs celebrating the 70th anniversary of the founding of the People's Republic of China.

== History ==
Composed within 20 minutes by Qin Yongcheng in 1983, the song had no words until the lyricist, Zhang Li, went on a trip to Zhangjiajie approximately six months later. The natural beauty of the land provided the inspiration needed, and the lyrics were written in 1984. Drawing on the beauty of mountains, rivers, lakes and seas, and on one's love for the motherland, the song reflects the natural beauty of China, and celebrates one's relationship with their motherland.

Chinese singing star Li Guyi was chosen to sing the debut of the song in 1984, which was followed by performances all over China. The song was an instant hit, and was added to the music curriculum for vocal students in China. It remains popular to this day, and has been performed frequently in China and internationally.

The song was chosen to be the theme song of the anthology drama film My People, My Country (2019), which was released in September 2019. It became an unofficial anthem in China, especially during and after the 70th anniversary of the People's Republic of China. Flash mobs sang it in major gathering places across China in 2019, including the Beijing Capital International Airport, Shenzhen North station, Sansha, and many others, resulting in a viewership of over 600 million people. Chinese Communist Party general secretary Xi Jinping mentioned it in his 2020 new year address, calling the "ode to a new China" a paradigm of the patriotic spirit of China, inspiring the Chinese to work harder.

In the opening ceremony of the 2022 Beijing Winter Olympics, the song accompanied the entrance of Chinese athletes.

== Music ==
This song uses a "downward" tune. It's in 6/8 9/8.

Below is the music for the first stanza.

== Lyrics ==
Simplified Chinese

我和我的祖国
一刻也不能分割
无论我走到哪里
都流出一首赞歌
……

Pinyin

wǒ hé wǒ de zǔguó
yīkè yě bù'néng fēn'gē
wúlùn wǒ zǒudào nǎlǐ
dōu liúchū yī shǒu zàn'gē
……

English translation

Never can we be apart
my motherland and me
No matter where I travel
the hymn flows from me
...
