= Party building =

Chinese Communist Party term

Party building (Chinese: 党的建设; pinyin: Dǎng de jiànshè) is a term used by the Chinese Communist Party (CCP) to describe its efforts in strengthening its organizational and ideological discipline.

== History ==
in 2015, the CCP launched Party building work in state-owned enterprises.

== See also ==
- Central Leading Group for Party Building
- Xi Jinping Thought on Party Building
