= Central Leading Group for Party Building =

Chinese Communist Party body

- 中央党的建设工作领导小组
- Emblem of the Chinese Communist Party

Agency overview
- Formed: March 2018; 8 years ago
- Type: Leading small group
- Jurisdiction: Chinese Communist Party
- Headquarters: Beijing
- Agency executives: Cai Qi, Leader; Li Xi, Deputy Leader
- Parent agency: Central Committee of the Chinese Communist Party

Central Leading Group for Party Building
- Simplified Chinese: 中央党的建设工作领导小组
Transcriptions
Standard Mandarin
- Hanyu Pinyin: Zhōngyāng Dǎngde Jiànshè Gōngzuò Lǐngdǎo Xiǎozǔ

The Central Leading Group for Party Building is a coordination body set up under the Central Committee of the Chinese Communist Party responsible for Party building work.

== History ==
The Central Leading Group for Party Building was created in 1988.

In April 2024, the leading group held a meeting presided by Cai Qi, which said a Party discipline education campaign within the CCP would be held from April to July 2024.

== Functions ==
The leading group is responsible for Party building work.
