= Cai Qi =

Chief of Staff for CCP general secretary Xi Jinping

- 蔡奇
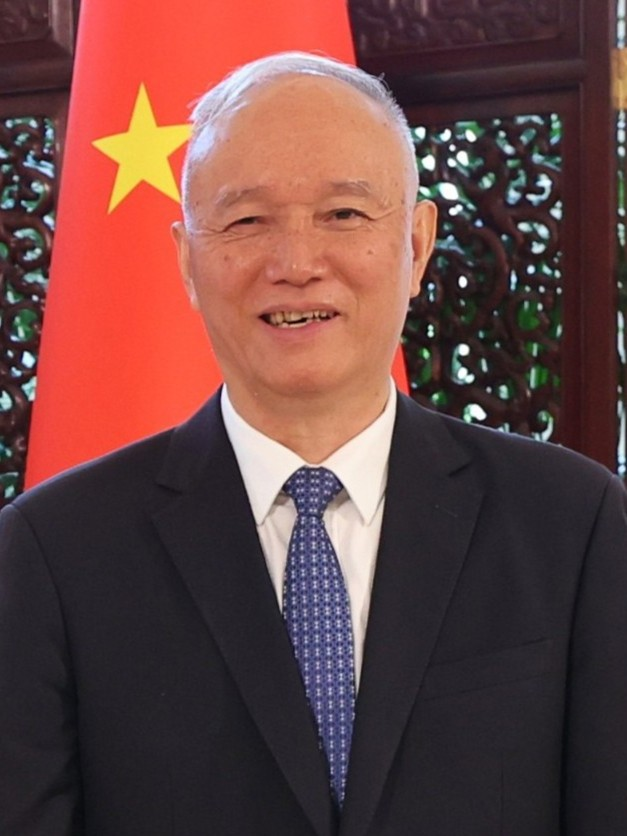
- Cai in 2025

Director of the General Office of the Chinese Communist Party
- Incumbent
- Assumed office March 20, 2023
- Deputy: Meng Xiangfeng
- General Secretary: Xi Jinping
- Preceded by: Ding Xuexiang

President of the Central Party School
- Incumbent
- Assumed office June 5, 2026
- General Secretary: Xi Jinping
- Preceded by: Chen Xi

Party Secretary of Beijing
- In office May 27, 2017 – November 13, 2022
- Deputy: Chen Jining; Yin Yong (Mayor)
- Preceded by: Guo Jinlong
- Succeeded by: Yin Li

Mayor of Beijing
- In office October 31, 2016 – May 27, 2017 (Acting until January 20, 2017)
- Party Secretary: Guo Jinlong
- Preceded by: Wang Anshun
- Succeeded by: Chen Jining

President of the Organizing Committee for the Olympic and Paralympic Winter Games
- In office February 25, 2018 – March 13, 2022
- IOC President: Thomas Bach
- Preceded by: Lee Hee-beom
- Succeeded by: Giovanni Malagò

Chair of the Beijing Organizing Committee for the 2022 Olympic and Paralympic Winter Games
- In office June 9, 2017 – March 13, 2022
- Preceded by: Guo Jinlong
- Succeeded by: Position dissolved

Personal details
- Born: December 5, 1955 (age 70) Youxi County, Fujian, China
- Party: Chinese Communist Party (1975–present)
- Children: 1
- Education: Fujian Normal University (BEc)

Chinese name
- Traditional Chinese: 蔡奇
- Simplified Chinese: 蔡奇
Transcriptions
Standard Mandarin
- Hanyu Pinyin: Cài Qí
- Bopomofo: ㄘㄞㄑㄧ
- Wade–Giles: Ts'ai Ch'i
- Tongyong Pinyin: Cai Ci
- IPA: [tsʰâɪ tɕʰǐ]
Yue: Cantonese
- Yale Romanization: Tsai Chi

Cai Qi (Chinese: 蔡奇; pinyin: Cài Qí; born December 5, 1955) is a Chinese politician, who is the current first-ranked member of the Secretariat of the Chinese Communist Party (CCP), fifth-ranking member of the CCP's Politburo Standing Committee and the director of the CCP General Office, effectively making him the chief of staff to CCP General Secretary Xi Jinping.

A graduate of Fujian Normal University, Cai began his career in his native Fujian province, where he worked at the Fujian Provincial Committee of the CCP. In 1997, he became the mayor of Sanming, serving there until 1999. In that year, he was transferred to Zhejiang to become the mayor of Quzhou, working there until 2002. He worked as the CCP committee secretary of Taizhou from 2002 to 2007, and as the mayor of Hangzhou from 2007 to 2010. From 2010 to 2014, he served as the executive vice governor of Zhejiang.

In 2014, he was transferred to Beijing to serve as deputy director of the CCP National Security Commission Office (rank equivalent of minister). From 2016 to 2017, he served as the mayor of Beijing. Between 2017 and 2022, he was the Party Secretary of Beijing. During his tenure, Cai oversaw Beijing's response to the COVID-19 pandemic, as well as preparations for the 2022 Winter Olympics. In 2022, he was promoted to the 5th-ranked member of the Politburo Standing Committee and was elected to the Secretariat. In 2026, he became president of the Central Party School. Largely due to Cai's extensive experience working in Zhejiang province, he is believed to be a political ally of CCP General Secretary Xi Jinping.

== Early life ==
Cai was born in Youxi County, Fujian province, on December 5, 1955. During the latter years of the Cultural Revolution he worked at the Xiyang Commune, Yong'an, Fujian. He joined the Chinese Communist Party (CCP) in August 1975. Cai attended Fujian Normal University and graduated in 1978 with a degree in political economics. Afterwards, he stayed in the university as an official in its CCP committee, working there until 1983.

== Early local careers ==
=== Fujian ===
In 1983, he was transferred to the Fujian Provincial Committee of the CCP, working there as a clerk until 1985, then working as a division deputy head between 1985 and 1987, and then working as a mishu at a General Work Department between 1987 and 1991. He worked as the deputy director of the Office of Political Reform between 1991 and 1992, deputy director of the Party Building Department between 1992 and 1993, and deputy director of the Provincial Party General Office between 1993 and 1996. As deputy director of the General Office, he was primarily a personal secretary to then Fujian CCP secretary Chen Guangyi.

Between 1994 and 1997, he pursued a post-graduate degree in economic law at his alma mater via part-time studies. He additionally attended a four-month training program for department and prefecture-level cadres at the CCP Central Party School in 1996. In September 1996 Cai took on his first major role in local government as the deputy CCP secretary, and later in November 1997, mayor of the city of Sanming in Fujian, working there until 1999.

=== Zhejiang ===
He was transferred to Zhejiang province in May 1999 serving as the deputy CCP committee secretary and mayor of Quzhou, working there until 2002. Cai additionally pursued a doctoral degree in political economics, which he obtained from September 1999 to July 2001 at Fujian Normal University through part-time studies. Between March 2002 and April 2004 Cai served as Quzhou's CCP secretary, the top political office of the city. He engaged with the Double Eight Strategy of the Zhejiang Provincial Committee and executed the dual initiatives of designating the city as an industrial hub and capitalizing on its developmental advantages, thereby establishing a foundation for advancement in Quzhou.

In April 2004, Cai became party secretary of Taizhou, Zhejiang; at the time, Xi Jinping was the party secretary of Zhejiang province. In 2007, Cai was promoted to the positions of mayor and deputy CCP secretary of Hangzhou, the provincial capital. In July 2008, as Hangzhou mayor, Cai started a scheme to recruit petition liaison officers.

In January 2010, he became a member of the provincial CCP Standing Committee as head of the party's provincial Organization Department. In November 2013, Cai became the Executive Vice Governor of Zhejiang province, where he was the deputy of then Governor of Zhejiang Li Qiang. He made the announcement of his change in jobs on his Tencent Weibo account before the official media's announcement was made.

== Beijing ==
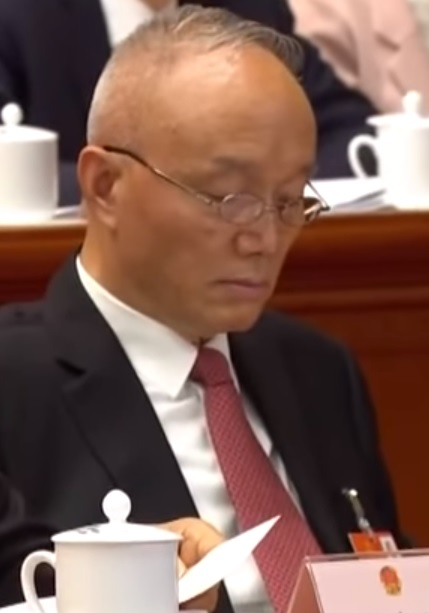
Cai at the third session of the 13th National People's Congress in May 2020

In March 2014, Cai was said to have been transferred to Beijing to work as the deputy director of the General Office of the CCP National Security Commission, a newly established body led by CCP general secretary Xi Jinping, though no official announcement was made about this appointment. In April 2015, he assumed the position of Executive Deputy Director of the Office of the Central National Security Commission.

=== Party Secretary of Beijing ===
On October 31, 2016, Cai was appointed acting mayor of Beijing, replacing Wang Anshun. In November 2016, he served as the Executive Chairman of the Organizing Committee for the Beijing 2022 Winter Olympic and Paralympic Games. In December 2016, in response to rising house prices, he said the municipal government would "make sure" prices will "not rise" in 2017. On January 7, 2017, Cai announced the creation of a new environmental police, which he said would target open-air barbecues, garbage incineration and the burning of wood and other biomass. He also set ambitious targets for reducing pollution in the city.

He was formally appointed as mayor by the Beijing Municipal People's Congress on January 20, 2017. He was also appointed as the deputy CCP committee secretary of Beijing. In February 2017, he became the head of a leading group in Beijing to ensure that the military stopped providing paid services. In May 2017, Cai was appointed as CCP committee secretary of Beijing. Cai's appointment broke nearly all conventions in post-Cultural Revolution political tradition; he was neither a member nor alternate member of the Central Committee, and took on an office that would, under normal circumstances, be accorded Politburo membership.

In preparation for the 19th CCP National Congress, Cai called for strengthening social controls and cyber security defense, and cracking down on "various political rumors and harmful information" in September 2017. He was elected to the 19th CCP Politburo by the first plenary session of the 19th Central Committee immediately after the 19th CCP National Congress in October 2017, becoming one of the few people to be appointed to the Politburo without having previously been on the CCP Central Committee.

In 2017, early in his tenure, Cai came under controversy due to the forceful eviction of many migrant workers from Beijing. On November 18, 2017, a fire incident transpired in a communal rental housing structure in Xihongmen, Beijing, leading to 19 fatalities and 8 injuries. Following the incident and the resultant casualties from the fire, Beijing initiated a 40-day special operation on November 20, 2017, aimed at conducting a comprehensive investigation and remediation of potential safety hazards, particularly in group-rented housing identified as having significant fire risks.

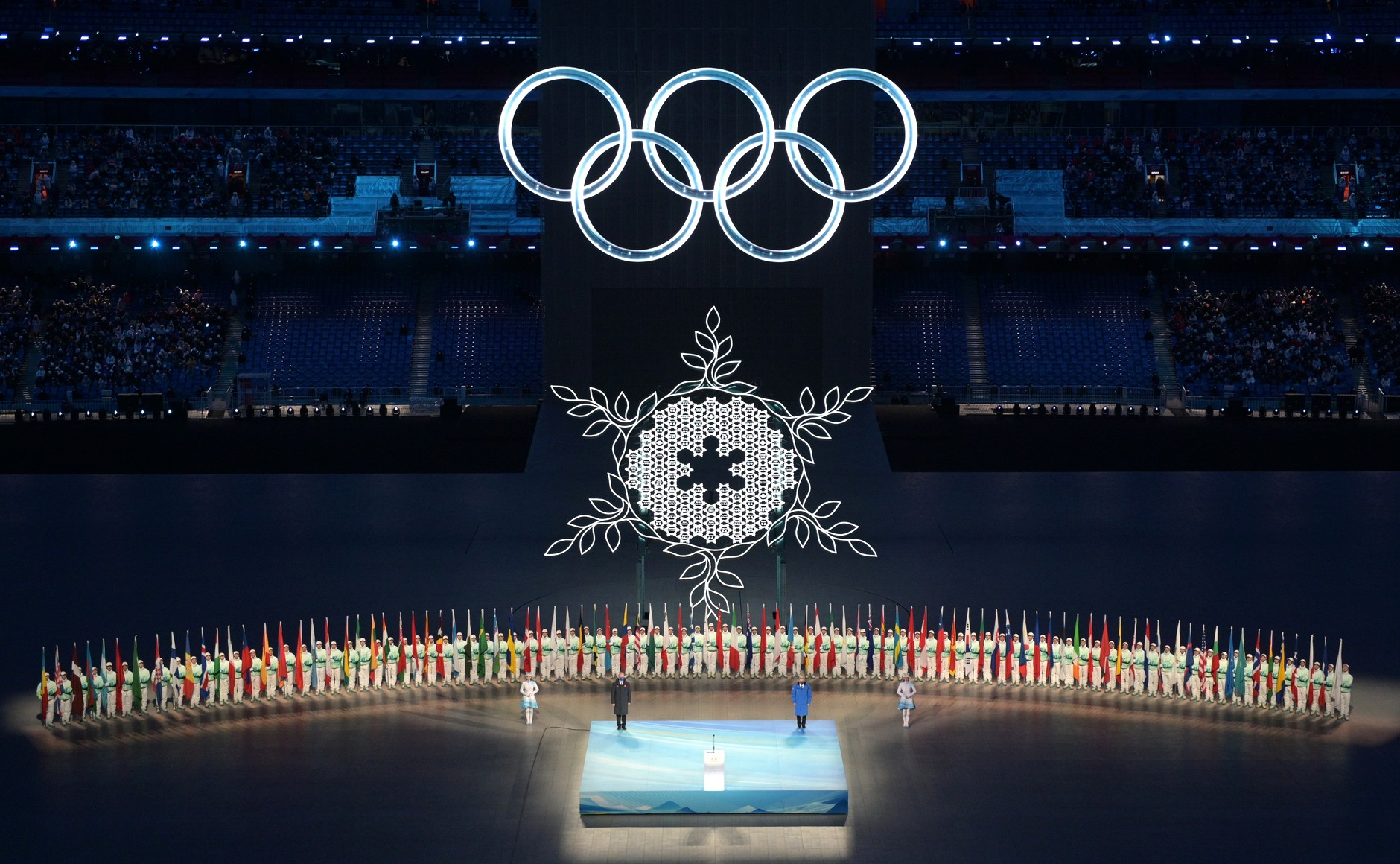
Opening ceremony of the XXIV Winter Olympic Games in Beijing. On the blue field are Cai Qi (left) and Thomas Bach (right).

During his tenure in Beijing, Cai Qi promoted environmental protection. In 2016, the yearly average PM2.5 concentration in Beijing decreased by 9.9% compared to the previous year, resulting in a total reduction of 23.7% since 2012. He also worked on national security issues, especially cybersecurity. In June 2020, Cai was appointed to lead the team charged with the elimination of coronavirus in the Xinfadi market.

As the Beijing Party secretary, Cai was responsible for organizing the 2022 Olympic and Paralympic Winter Games in Beijing. In June 2017, he was appointed President of the Beijing Organizing Committee for the 2022 Olympic and Paralympic Winter Games. He gave an opening speech during the opening ceremony of the Olympics, as well as during the closing ceremony. He was awarded the Gold Olympic Order after the Olympics.

== Member of the Secretariat ==
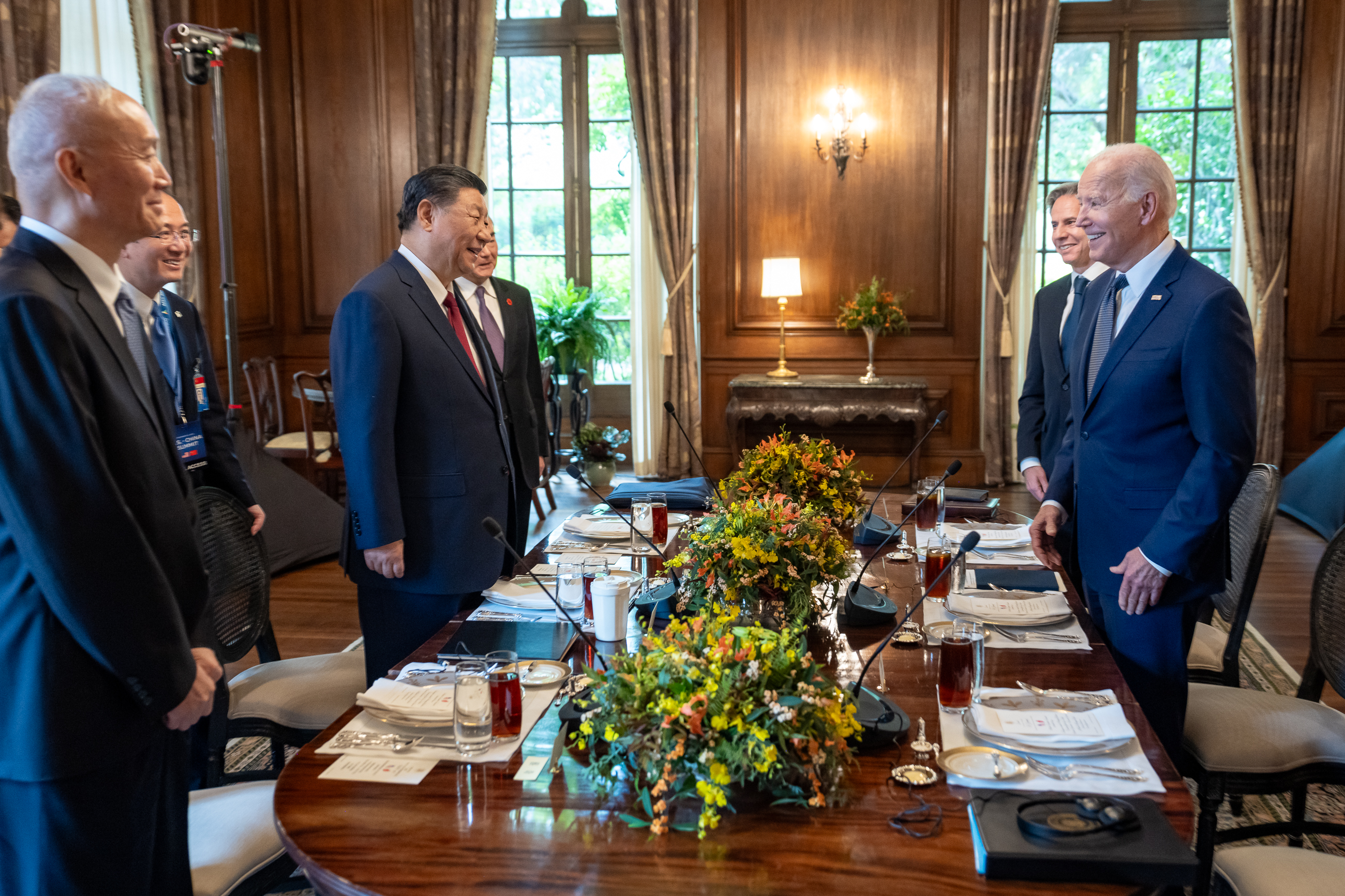
US President Joe Biden hosts a lunch for Chinese leader Xi Jinping on November 15, 2023, at the Filoli Estate in Woodside, California; Cai Qi is on the left.

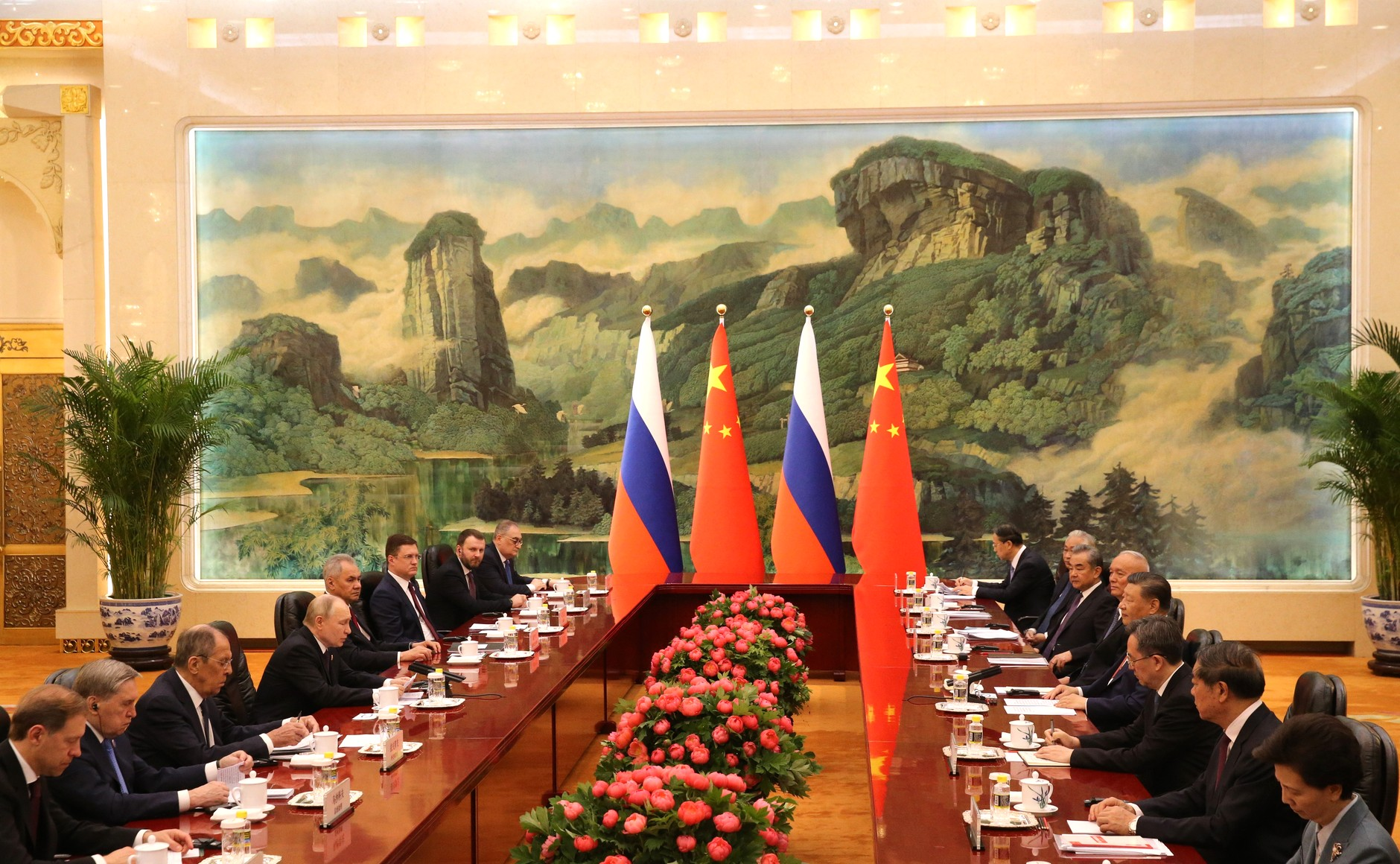
Russian-Chinese negotiations during Putin's visit to China in May 2024, Cai Qi is seated to Xi Jinping's right.

Following the 1st Plenary Session of the 20th CCP Central Committee in October 2022, Cai was appointed to the CCP Politburo Standing Committee as its fifth-ranking member, also becoming the first-ranking member of the CCP Secretariat. On November 13, 2022, Cai Qi relinquished his position as Secretary of the Beijing Municipal Committee, being succeeded by Yin Li. On December 6, 2022, Cai Qi officiated Jiang Zemin's memorial service at the Great Hall of the People in Beijing. On December 11, Jiang Zemin's widow Wang Yeping and other relatives, as well as Cai Qi, scattered Jiang's ashes along with flower petals at the estuary of the Yangtze River. In March 2023, he became the director of the CCP General Office, succeeding Ding Xuexiang; this was the first time that the General Office director had been on the Politburo Standing Committee since Wang Dongxing in 1977. Cai was revealed as a deputy head of the CCP National Security Commission in May 2023. According to the South China Morning Post, Xi appointed Cai to succeed himself as the leader of the Central Cyberspace Affairs Commission in the first half of 2023. Cai has also frequently accompanied Xi on trips, responsible for arranging his security, schedule and daily affairs.

He spoke at the annual National Conference of Publicity Ministers (NCPM) in January 2023, where he called on officials to use core socialist values, improve foreign propaganda work, and uphold Xi Jinping Thought and Two Establishments and Two Upholds. In August, Cai hosted 57 scientists at the "forefront of domestic technology" in Beidaihe. In October, Cai held the National Conference on Publicity, Ideology and Cultural Work, where the CCP put forward the Xi Jinping Thought on Culture. At the January 2024 annual NCPM, Cai called on propaganda officials to "strengthen positive energy and public opinion guidance" and "sing loudly about China's bright economic prospects". In April 2024, Cai Qi presided over a meeting of the Central Leading Group for Party Building, which said a Party discipline education campaign within the CCP would be held from April to July 2024. In August 2024, he hosted leading scientists from artificial intelligence, quantum physics, deep-sea exploration and aerospace sectors in Beidaihe.

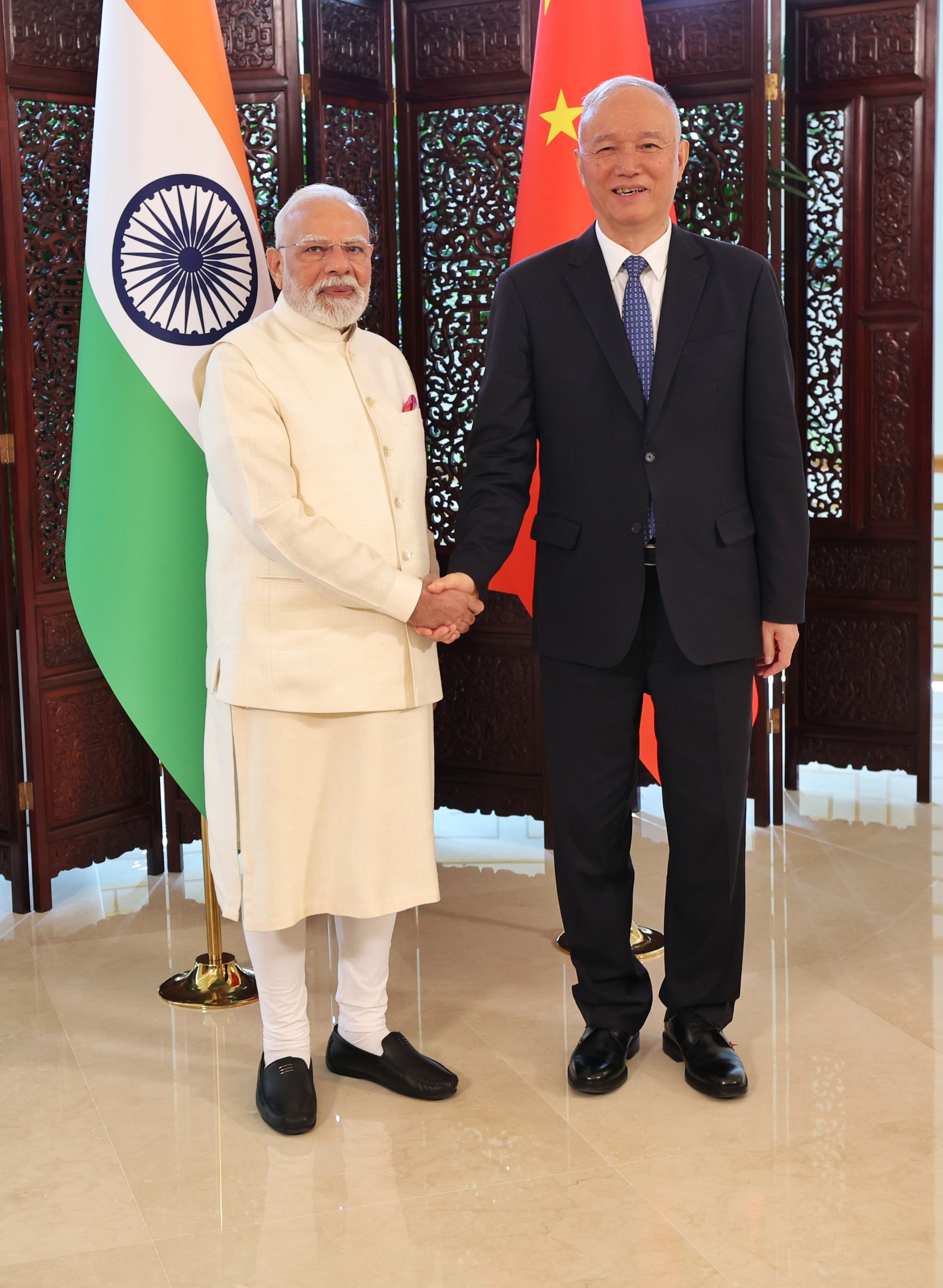
Cai Qi meeting with Indian Prime Minister Narendra Modi during the 2025 Tianjin SCO Summit.

In January 2025, Cai called on officials to step up promotion of China's economic achievements at the annual NCPM conference. On February 5, 2025, he chaired a meeting of the central-level special working mechanism aimed at rectifying formalism to alleviate burdens on grassroots entities, underscoring the execution of the Central Committee's Eight-point Regulation and the ongoing efforts to mitigate formalism's impact on grassroots operations. In August 2025, he hosted experts from high-tech industries, young talent engaged in fundamental research and scholars of philosophy and the social sciences in Beidaihe. During the 2025 Tianjin SCO summit, Cai met with Indian Prime Minister Narendra Modi, Egyptian Prime Minister Mostafa Madbouly and Turkish President Recep Tayyip Erdoğan. In November 2025, Cai published an opinion piece in the People's Daily, where he stressed the "extreme importance of exercising full and rigorous party self-governance to achieve the economic and social development goals of the 15th Five-Year Plan period". In the same month, he led the Central Conference on Social Work. Since the end of December 2025, Cai has led the Central Leading Group for Social Governance.

In January 2026, Cai called on officials to prioritize economic publicity at the annual NCPM conference. On February 24, 2026, Cai convened a meeting in Beijing with Li Xi to start a campaign to urge officials to correct any deviations from the "correct" line in their own duties and in assessments of their subordinates. Cai was part of the drafting team led by Xi that drafted the resolution adopted in October 2026 by the fifth plenary session of the 20th Central Committee; the team began its work in February 2026. In April 2026, Cai accompanied Xi during his meeting with Kuomintang chairwoman Cheng Li-wun. In June 2026, he became the president of the Central Party School. In the same month, he presided over the National Conference on Party Building, where the Xi Jinping Thought on Party Building was created. On June 18, he was appointed as the president of the National Academy ‌of Governance. On August 3, he attended a meeting of 60 experts in Beidaihe.

== Public image ==
Cai is known for his extensive use of social media and his unorthodox approach to governance. Cai has referred to Xi as "Xi Dada" (Uncle Xi) and "Boss Xi" in public media. The Economist opined in 2017 as Cai "rocketed up the Communist Party's ranks" that "Xi Jinping has chosen an unusual man to lead the capital city." Cai is said to have been a fan of Netflix's House of Cards series, and was cited as a fan of the iPhone.

Cai maintains a Weibo microblog account under the subtitle "Cai Qi, a Bolshevik", which has been active since May 2010. The account was initially opened under the name Qianshui (潜水; literally, "scuba diving"), but he was eventually 'outed' by internet users. The account is 'followed' by over ten million people. He used it regularly to communicate with citizens. As a sub-provincial-level official Cai was one of the few high-ranking officials to maintain a regular social media presence. During his four years of using Weibo, he averaged more than six posts a day, which he compiled into a book called "A Room Made of Glass", saying he choose the title to promote transparency. He stopped posting on Weibo after his transfer to Beijing in March 2014.

== Personal life ==
Cai is known to speak with a heavy Fujian accent. Before retirement, Cai Qi's wife was a bureau-level official in Zhejiang. The couple have a son, who previously worked as an official at the subdistrict level in Hangzhou and as a staff member at the National Development and Reform Commission.

Party political offices
Preceded by Ding Xuexiang	Director of the General Office of the Chinese Communist Party; 2022–present	Incumbent
Preceded by Guo Jinlong	Party Secretary of Beijing; 2017–2022	Succeeded by Yin Li
Preceded by Si Xinliang	Head of the Organization Department of Zhejiang province 2010–2013	Succeeded by Hu Heping
Sporting positions
Preceded by (China) Guo Jinlong	President of Organizing Committee for Winter Olympic Games; 2022	Succeeded by (Italy) Giovanni Malagò
Government offices
Preceded by Wang Anshun	Mayor of Beijing; 2016–2017	Succeeded by Chen Jining
Preceded by Sun Zhonghuan	Mayor of Hangzhou; 2007–2010	Succeeded by Shao Zhanwei
Order of precedence
Preceded by Wang Huning as Chairman of the National Committee of the Chinese People's Political Consultative Conference	Order of precedence of China as Member of the Politburo Standing Committee of the Chinese Communist Party	Succeeded by Ding Xuexiang as Member of the Politburo Standing Committee of the Chinese Communist Party
