= Yang Anjiang =

Chinese politician

- Born: August 1945 (age 80); Xupu County, Hunan, China
- Occupation: Chairman of CPPCC Beijing Committee

Yang Anjiang (Chinese: 阳安江; pinyin: Yáng Ānjiāng; born August 1945) is a politician of the People's Republic of China. Yang was born in Xupu County, Hunan in 1945. He joined the Chinese Communist Party in 1965, and in 2006 he became the Chairman of the Beijing Municipal Committee of the Chinese People's Political Consultative Conference. Yang was a member of the 16th Central Commission for Discipline Inspection.

Preceded by Cheng Shi'e	Chairman of CPPCC Beijing Municipal Committee; 2006–2011	Succeeded by Wang Anshun
