= Andrew Parsons (sports administrator) =

International Paralympic Committee president

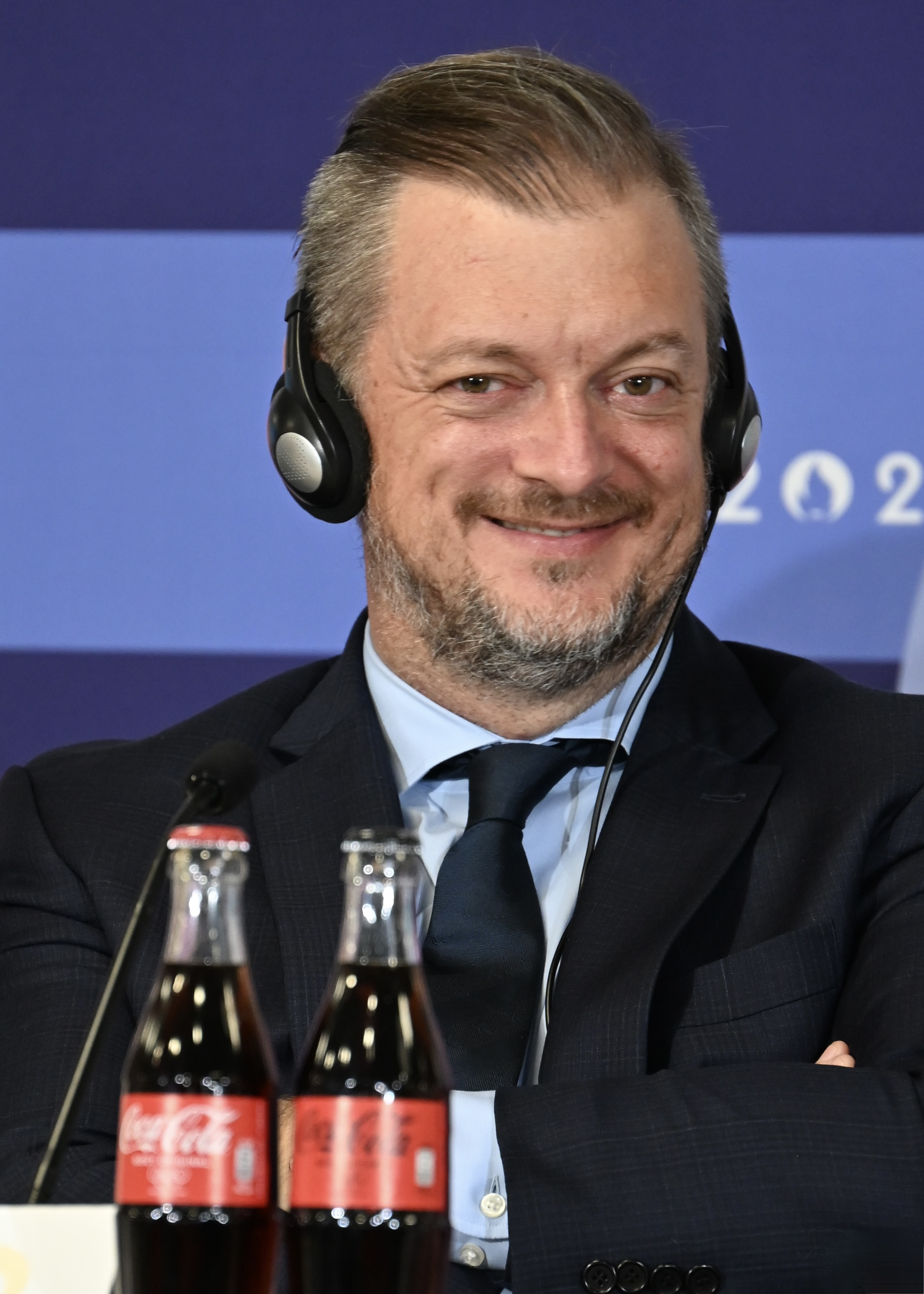
- Parsons at a 2024 Paralympic Games media conference in 2024

3rd President of the International Paralympic Committee
- Incumbent
- Assumed office 8 September 2017
- Preceded by: Sir Philip Craven

Personal details
- Born: 10 February 1977 (age 49) Rio de Janeiro, Brazil
- Occupation: President of the International Paralympic Committee

Andrew George William Parsons (Brazilian Portuguese: [ˈɐndɾu ˈpaʁsõs]; born 10 February 1977) is a Brazilian sports administrator and journalist. He is the current president of the International Paralympic Committee (IPC). In 2018, Parsons became a member of the International Olympic Committee (IOC).

== Life and early career ==
Parsons was born in Brazil to Scottish parents. He served as chairperson of the Brazilian Paralympic Committee from 2009 to 2017, chairperson of the Americas Paralympic Committee from 2005 to 2009, and as a member of the nominating committee for the 2020 Summer Olympics. He previously helped organize the 2007 Parapan American Games and the 2016 Summer Olympics in Rio de Janeiro.

== President of the International Paralympic Committee ==
He has been the president of the International Paralympic Committee since 8 September 2017. Parsons took over from Sir Philip Craven, who had been in office since 2001, after being elected in the first round in the election held during the 18th assembly of the IPC in Abu Dhabi. He was reelected in 2025.

Parsons himself does not have a disability, a fact that, he says, takes some observers by surprise. Parsons has proposed the establishment of a "Youth Paralympic Games", akin to the Youth Olympic Games, but the proposal has been shelved indefinitely.

While attending the opening ceremony for the 2022 Winter Paralympics, Parsons declared his horror at the Russian invasion of Ukraine and called on world authorities to promote peace. While addressing the spectators and athletes in attendance at Beijing, in China's Bird Nest, Parsons stated that "Tonight, I want, I must begin with a message of peace" and that "As the leader of an organization with inclusion at its core, where diversity is celebrated and differences embraced, I am horrified at what is taking place in the world right now." Previously, the IPC initially announced that the RPC team designation would be banned and that Russian athletes could only compete at the 2022 Winter Paralympics under a fully neutral designation as in 2018. After boycott threats from other nations, the IPC on 3 March 2022 banned Russian athletes from competing entirely. On 29 September 2023, the IPC decided to continue to partially suspend both the Russian and Belarusian NPCs for two years. However, in September 2025, the IPC voted to lift the bans on the Russian and Belarusian National Paralympic Committees, with the countries returning to the Games in 2026. In addition, IPC president Parsons stated that injured Russian soldiers would be allowed to compete at a future Paralympic Games, saying that "the democracy of our movement" must be respected.

== Distinctions ==
- Commander of the Order of Rio Branco
- Diploma of Fair Play, awarded by the International Fair Play Committee during the 2004 Summer Paralympics.
- Grand Cordon of the Order of the Rising Sun (2025)
