= Wang Anshun =

Chinese politician

- 王安顺
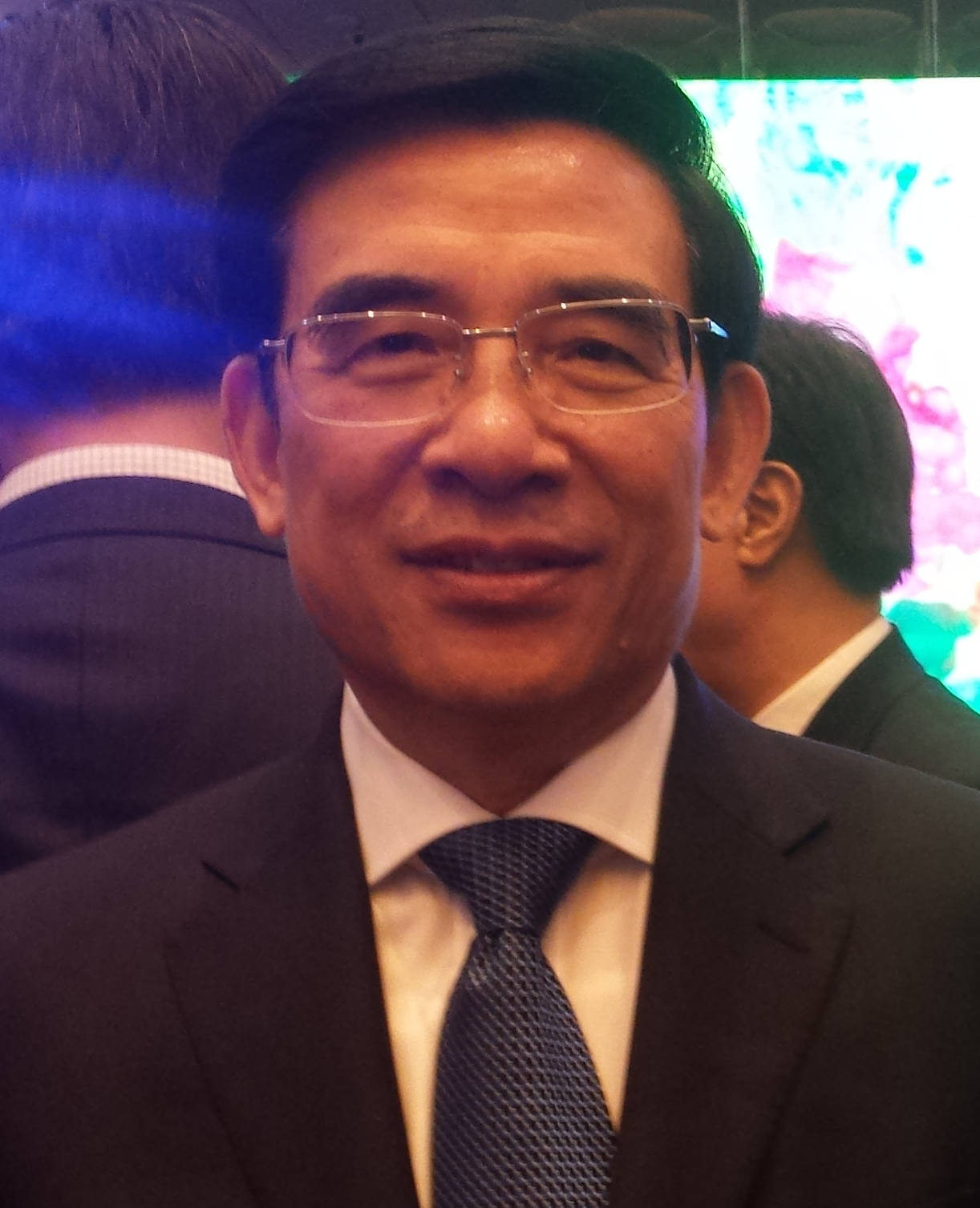
- Wang in 2016

Mayor of Beijing
- In office 25 July 2012 – 31 October 2016; Acting until 28 January 2013
- Preceded by: Guo Jinlong
- Succeeded by: Cai Qi

Chairman of the Beijing Municipal Committee of the Chinese People's Political Consultative Conference
- In office 19 January 2011 – 25 January 2013
- Preceded by: Yang Anjiang
- Succeeded by: Ji Lin

Personal details
- Born: December 1957 (age 68) Huixian, Henan, China
- Party: Chinese Communist Party
- Education: Wuhan College of Geology; Nankai University

Chinese name
- Simplified Chinese: 王安顺
- Traditional Chinese: 王安順
Transcriptions
Standard Mandarin
- Hanyu Pinyin: Wáng Ānshùn

Wang Anshun (Chinese: 王安顺; born December 1957) is a Chinese politician who served as Mayor of Beijing between 2012 and 2016, the 15th person to hold the office under Communist Party rule. Wang began his career in geological exploration, then made the transition into politics, serving in Gansu, Shanghai, and Beijing through his career.

== Early life and education ==
Wang was born in Huixian, Henan Province, in 1957. He attended the Wuhan College of Geology. Wang also obtained a master's degree in economics from Nankai University.

== Career ==
Wang joined the Chinese Communist Party in March 1984. He began to work in the petroleum industry and was in charge of oil exploration in northeastern Jilin Province, before obtaining his master's degree at Nankai.

From July 1999 to September 2001, Wang worked in the Communist Party Committee of Gansu Province as head of the provincial organization department. Wang was transferred to Shanghai in September 2001, and, in April 2003, he was promoted to the position of Deputy Party Secretary of Shanghai. In March 2007, he was transferred to the same position in Beijing, and, in January 2011, he additionally became chairman of the People's Political Consultative Conference of Beijing.

In July 2012, Wang's predecessor Guo Jinlong resigned from his position as Mayor of Beijing, and Wang Anshun was appointed mayor in his place. It is not clear how Wang won favour over the years to take on what was evidently the most important mayoralty in China; Wang Qishan and Liu Qi had both held the position, prior to their ascendancy to the Politburo. Initially, Chinese-language media speculated that Wang's candidacy was advocated by Wen Jiabao, with whom Wang shared a background in geology. Wang, who was a relatively youthful 55 at the time of his appointment, seemed destined for the coveted Beijing party chief position.

On 28 January 2013, he was duly elected Mayor of Beijing by the Municipal People's Congress. Wang's term lasted just over four years, during which assisted in Beijing's successful bid for the 2022 Winter Olympics. On 30 October 2016, Wang resigned as mayor of Beijing, revealing that he was being transferred to another position. Wang was succeeded by Cai Qi, an ally of Xi Jinping. Wang was transferred to the Development Research Center of the State Council.

Wang was an alternate member of the 17th Central Committee of the Chinese Communist Party, and a member of the 18th Central Committee.

Party political offices
Preceded by Yang Limin	Head of Organization Department of Gansu Provincial Committee of the Chinese Communist Party; 1999–2001	Succeeded by Xu Shousheng
Preceded by Luo Shiqian	Head of Organization Department of Shanghai Municipal Committee of the Chinese Communist Party; 2001–2004	Succeeded by Jiang Sixian
Preceded by Han Zheng	Deputy Communist Party Secretary of Shanghai; 2003–2007	Succeeded by Yin Yicui
Preceded by Yang Anjiang	Deputy Communist Party Secretary of Beijing; 2007–2012	Succeeded by Ji Lin
Preceded by Liu He	Party Branch Secretary of Development Research Center of the State Council; 2018–2022	Succeeded by Ma Jiantang
Assembly seats
Preceded by Yang Anjiang	Chairman of the Beijing Municipal Committee of the Chinese People's Political Consultative Conference; 2016–2018	Succeeded by Ji Lin
Government offices
Preceded by Guo Jinlong	Mayor of Beijing; 2012–2016	Succeeded by Cai Qi
