= Two Establishments =

Chinese Communist Party political slogan

The "Two Establishments" (Chinese: 两个确立; pinyin: Liǎng gè quèlì) is a Chinese Communist Party political slogan to reinforce general secretary Xi Jinping's rule. It was put forward by the sixth plenary session of the 19th Central Committee of the Chinese Communist Party in November 2021.

== History ==
The "Two Establishments," sometimes written as the "Two Establishes," first appeared in CCP discourse in 2018, but was put forward by the sixth plenary session of the 19th Central Committee of the Chinese Communist Party in November 2021. On 12 November 2021, the at a press conference of the Central Committee, Central Policy Research Office director Jiang Jinquan elaborated on the connotation of the "Two Establishments", calling them "the call of the times, the choice of history, and the will of the people", and also said that Xi Jinping is "the well-deserved core of the Party, the leader of the people, and the commander-in-chief of the army".

== Content ==
The Two Establishments are:

1. "Establishing Comrade Xi Jinping as the core of the Party Central Committee and the core position of the entire Party," (Note: 确立习近平同志党中央的核心、全党的核心地位)
2. "Establishing the guiding position of Xi Jinping Thought on Socialism with Chinese Characteristics for a New Era." (Note: 确立习近平新时代中国特色社会主义思想的指导地位)

== See also ==
- General secretaryship of Xi Jinping
- Xi Jinping Thought
- Ideology of the Chinese Communist Party
- Two Upholds
