= Two Upholds =

Chinese Communist Party slogan

- Simplified Chinese: 两个维护
Transcriptions

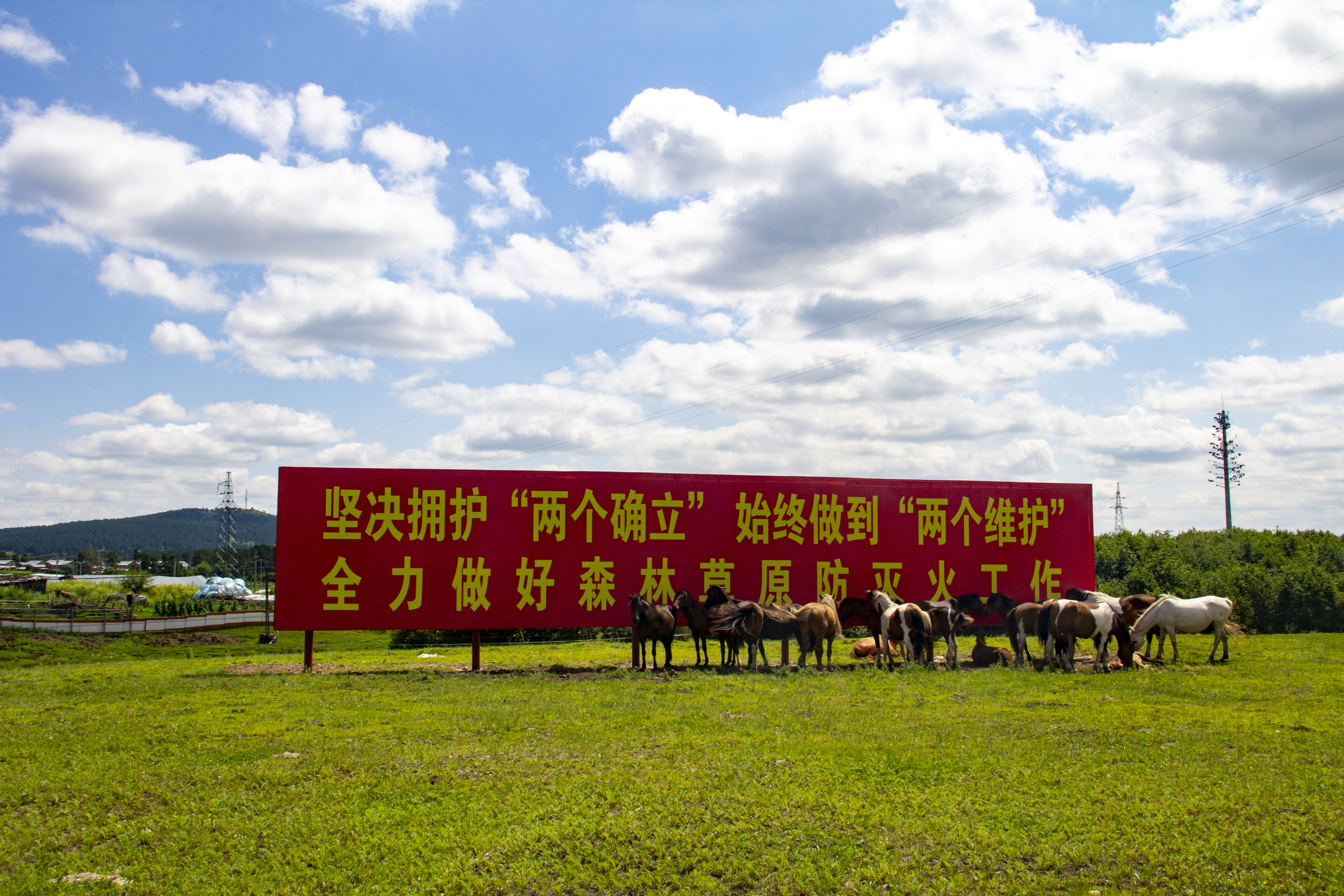
Bulletin board in Hongholji, Ewenki Autonomous Banner, Inner Mongolia

The "Two Upholds" is a Chinese Communist Party (CCP) political slogan to reinforce CCP general secretary Xi Jinping's rule.

== Meaning ==
The Two Upholds are:

1. "Resolutely upholds General Secretary Xi Jinping’s core status as the core of the Party Central Committee and the entire Party." (Note: 坚决维护习近平总书记党中央的核心、全党的核心地位)
2. "Resolutely upholds the authority and centralized and unified leadership of the Party Central Committee." (Note: 坚决维护党中央权威和集中统一领导)

== History ==
The slogan was first put forward by the Politburo of the Central Committee of the Chinese Communist Party in September 2018. On January 31, 2019, the Central Committee of the Chinese Communist Party published a statement and the liner notes referred to the "Two Upholds". In August 2021, the CCP party magazine Qiushi published an article entitled "Resolutely Doing the Two Maintenance", emphasizing that "General Secretary Xi Jinping, as the core of the whole party and the leader of the people, has the support of all people, and we support him wholeheartedly. Resolutely doing the 'two safeguards' is a solid foundation for adhering to, developing and perfecting the new political party system."

The 20th National Congress of the CCP in 2022 passed an amendment to write the "Two Upholds" into the CCP constitution. In 2023, the CCP Central Committee issued the newly revised Regulations on Disciplinary Action of the Chinese Communist Party, which included the "Two Upholds".

== See also ==
- General secretaryship of Xi Jinping
- Xi Jinping Thought
- Ideology of the Chinese Communist Party
- Two Establishes
