= Beijing Organizing Committee for the 2022 Olympic and Paralympic Winter Games =

2022 Olympics local organizing committee

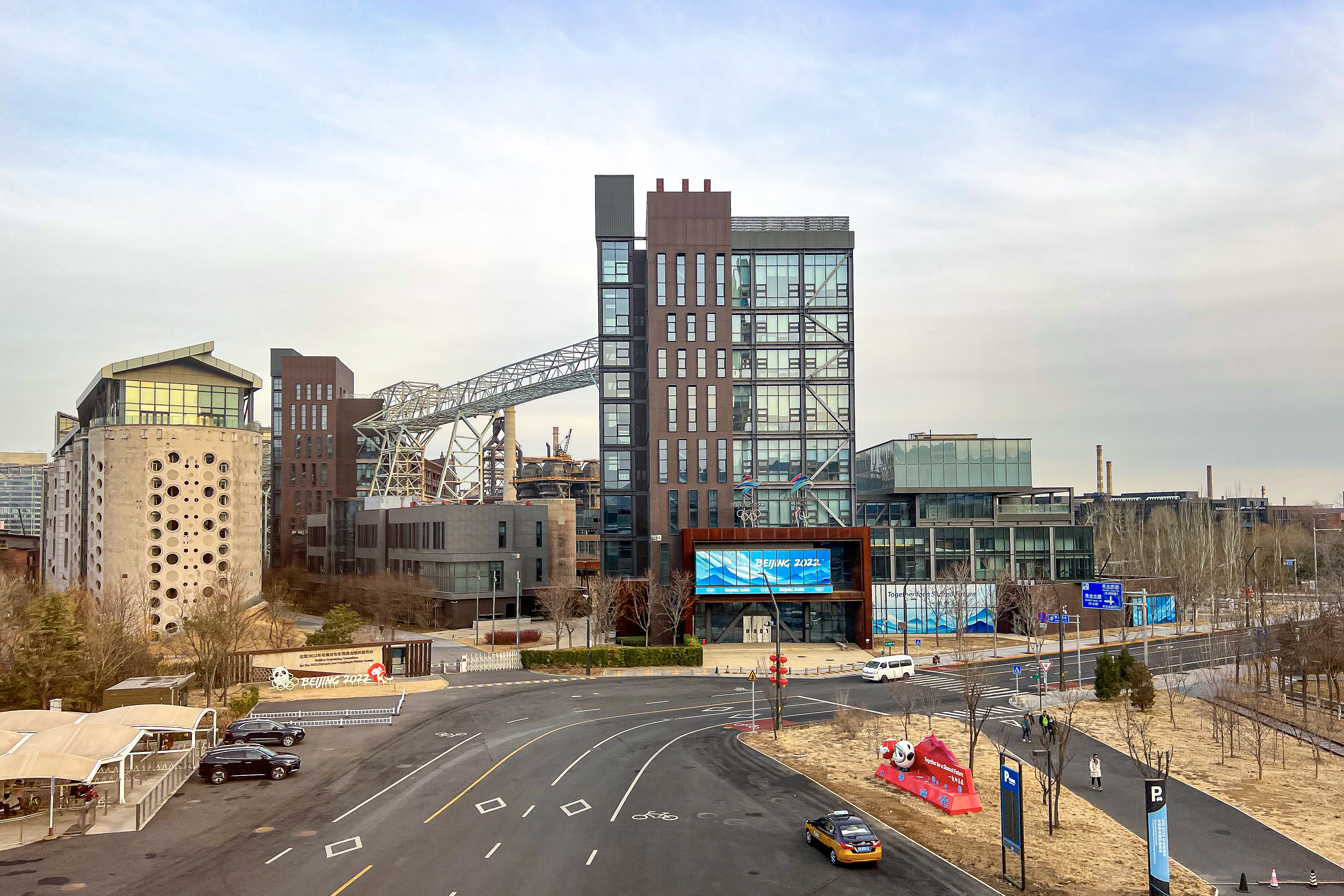
- Type: Company limited by guarantee
- Headquarters: Beijing
- Chairman: Cai Qi (Beijing CCP secretary)

The Beijing Organizing Committee for the 2022 Olympic and Paralympic Winter Games (Chinese: 北京2022年冬奥会和冬残奥会组织委员会) (BOCWOG) was a public institution with legal person status, responsible for the organisation and coordination of all the preparations and delivery of the 2022 Olympic and Paralympic Winter Games. It was located at the former steel plant of Shougang Corporation in Shijingshan District, Beijing. The executive board of the Beijing 2022 was its sole executive agency. The Chairman was Cai Qi, who is also a CCP Politburo member and Beijing CCP secretary.

== Organisation structure ==
=== Leadership ===
Position	Name	Birthdate	Other office(s)
President	Cai Qi	December 1955 (age 70)	Secretary of the CCP Beijing Municipal Committee, CCP Politburo member
Executive President	Gou Zhongwen	June 1957 (age 68)	Minister of the State General Administration of Sport of China
Executive President	Chen Jining	February 1964 (age 62)	Mayor of Beijing
Executive President	Xu Qin	October 1961 (age 64)	Governor of Hebei
Executive President	Zhang Haidi	September 1955 (age 70)	Chairperson of the China Disabled Persons' Federation
Executive Vice President	Zhang Jiandong	July 1962 (age 63)	Vice Mayor of Beijing
Vice President	Yang Shu'an	August 1957 (age 68)	Vice Minister of the State General Administration of Sport of China
Vice President	Xu Ning	December 1956 (age 69)	Vice Chairman of the Hebei Provincial Committee of the Chinese People's Political Consultative Committee
Vice President	Lu Yong	August 1963 (age 62)	Board Chairman of the China Disabled Persons' Federation
Vice President	Yu Zaiqing	April 1951 (age 74–75)	Vice President of the International Olympic Committee; Vice President of the Chinese Olympic Committee
Secretary General	Han Zirong	March 1964 (age 62)	
Executive Deputy Secretary General	Wu Jingmi		Secretary General of Beijing Olympic City Development Association

=== Departments ===
Departments	Position	Name	Birthdate
Secretariat and Administrative	Head	Guo Huaigang	October 1971 (age 54)
General Planning	Head	Xu Da	August 1957 (age 68)
General Planning	Deputy Head	Song Qiang	1975 (age 50–51)
General Planning	Deputy Head	Yu Hong	March 1963 (age 63)
Sports	Head	Tong Lixin	
Sports	Deputy Head	Wang Yanxia	May 1967 (age 58)
Media and Communications	Head	Chang Yu	December 1974 (age 51)
Media and Communications	Deputy Head	Zhao Wei	
Media and Communications	Deputy Head	Xu Jicheng	17 June 1960 (age 65)
Planning, Construction and Sustainability	Head	Liu Yumin	July 1966 (age 59)
Finance and Marketing	Head	Piao Xuedong	February 1970 (age 56)
Human Resources	Head	Yan Cheng	October 1968 (age 57)
Human Resources	Deputy Head	Zhao Boqun	
Yanqing Operating Centre	Deputy Head	Zhang Suzhi	March 1963 (age 63)

== See also ==
- 2022 Winter Olympics
- 2022 Winter Paralympics
