= Playback singer =

Singer whose singing is pre-recorded for use in film

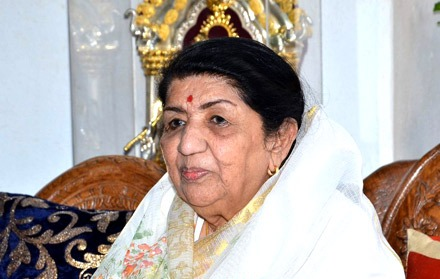
Indian playback singer Lata Mangeshkar recorded thousands of songs.

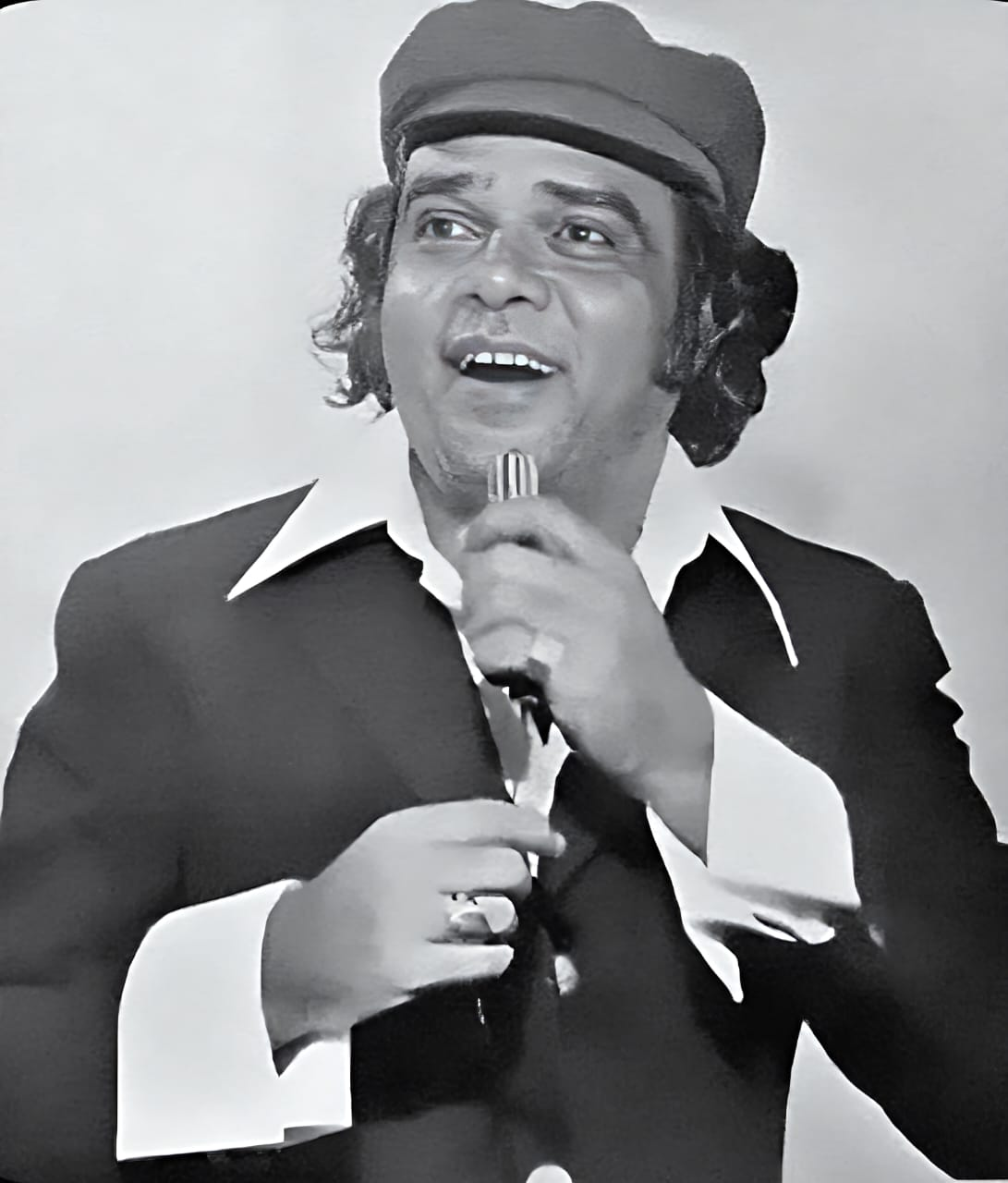
Pakistani playback singer Ahmed Rushdi during a live performance

A playback singer, as they are usually known in South Asian cinema, or ghost singer in Western cinema, is a vocalist whose performance is pre-recorded in audio, to be paired with another actor's filmed performance. Playback singers record songs for soundtracks, and the actors lip-sync the songs for camera; the actual playback singer does not appear on screen. Generally, to synchronise with the emotional situation of the song or complete film, the playback singer is given an idea or emotional context of that part of the film so that they can interpret by taking the right moves in their vocals.

== South Asia ==
South Asian films produced in the Indian subcontinent frequently use this technique. A majority of Indian films as well as Pakistani films typically include six or seven songs. After Alam Ara (1931), the first Indian talkie film, for many years singers made dual recordings for a film, one during the shoot, and later in the recording studio, until 1952 or 1953. Popular playback singers in India enjoy the same status as popular actors and music directors and receive wide public admiration. Most of the playback singers are initially trained in classical music, but they later often expand their range.

Mohammed Rafi and Ahmed Rushdi are regarded as two of the most influential playback singers in South Asia. The sisters Lata Mangeshkar and Asha Bhosle, who mainly worked in Hindi films, are two of the best-known and most prolific playback singers in India. In 2011, Guinness officially acknowledged Bhosle as the most recorded artist in music history.

== Hollywood ==
The practice is also employed in Hollywood musicals, where such performers are known as ghost singers, though less frequently in other genres. Notable Hollywood performances include Anita Ellis as the voice of Rita Hayworth's title character in Gilda (1946). Both Ellis's and Hayworth's performances were so impressive that audiences did not know that the latter's voice had been dubbed. Called "the sexiest voice of 1946", Ellis's identity was not publicised; Hayworth was instead credited on the soundtrack.

There have been other uses of ghost singing in Hollywood, including Marni Nixon in West Side Story for Natalie Wood's portrayal of Maria, in The King and I for Deborah Kerr's Anna Leonowens, and for Audrey Hepburn's Eliza in My Fair Lady; Bill Lee singing for John Kerr's Lieutenant Cable in South Pacific and for Christopher Plummer's Captain von Trapp in The Sound of Music, Lindsay Ridgeway for Ashley Peldon's character as Darla Dimple in the animated film Cats Don't Dance, Claudia Brücken providing the singing voice for Erika Heynatz's character as Elsa Lichtmann in L.A. Noire, and Betty Noyes singing for Debbie Reynolds in Singin' in the Rain, a film in which ghost singing is a major plot point.

The use of ghost singers to dub actors was sometimes kept secret from the public, and occasionally from the actors themselves. Studio executives sometimes felt that the public would be less inclined to see musical films if they knew the parts were not being sung by the screen actors. Marni Nixon successfully fought to receive royalty payments for her work on West Side Story.

== Examples ==
Known playback or ghost singers include:

- India Adams, who dubbed for Cyd Charisse in The Band Wagon (1953). That same year, she also dubbed for Joan Crawford in Torch Song.
- Bill Shirley, who dubbed for Jeremy Brett in Warner Bros. My Fair Lady
- Jo Ann Greer, who dubbed for Rita Hayworth, Kim Novak, and Dorothy Malone
- Marni Nixon, who dubbed for Ingrid Bergman in Joan of Arc, Deborah Kerr in The King and I and An Affair To Remember, for Natalie Wood in West Side Story, for Audrey Hepburn in My Fair Lady (1963), and for Marilyn Monroe in Gentlemen Prefer Blondes
- Betty Wand, who dubbed for Leslie Caron in Gigi
- Betty Noyes, who dubbed for Debbie Reynolds in Singin' in the Rain
- Annette Warren, who dubbed for Ava Gardner in Show Boat and Lucille Ball in both Fancy Pants and Sorrowful Jones
- Darlene Love ghost sang for girl group The Crystals, as acknowledged in the documentary 20 Feet From Stardom
- Papon (singer) provided the singing voice for Irrfan Khan in Qarib Qarib Singlle
- Bill Lee provided the singing voice for Matt Mattox as Caleb Pontipee in Seven Brides for Seven Brothers, John Kerr as Lieutenant Cable in South Pacific and for Christopher Plummer as Captain von Trapp in the film of The Sound of Music
- Thurl Ravenscroft provided the singing voice for Ken Clark as Stewpot in South Pacific and Fred Astaire in Daddy Long Legs
- John Wallace provided the singing voice for Paul L. Smith as Bluto in Popeye
- Diana Coupland provided the singing voice for Ursula Andress in the first official James Bond film, Dr. No
- Yang Peiyi, who dubbed for Lin Miaoke at the 2008 Olympics opening ceremony in Beijing
- Drew Seeley, an actor, dancer and singer provided the vocals for Zac Efron in the 2006 Disney musical film High School Musical
- Tsin Ting, who is perhaps best known as the Marni Nixon of Hong Kong cinema.
- Andrea Robinson, who provided the vocals for Wendy Makkena in the Sister Act franchise.
- Loren Allred provided the singing voice for Rebecca Ferguson in the film The Greatest Showman.

== See also ==
- Dubbing, also known as looping or post-sync
- Filmi-ghazal
- List of Pakistani film singers
