= 2008 Summer Olympics opening ceremony =

- Part of 2008 Summer Olympics
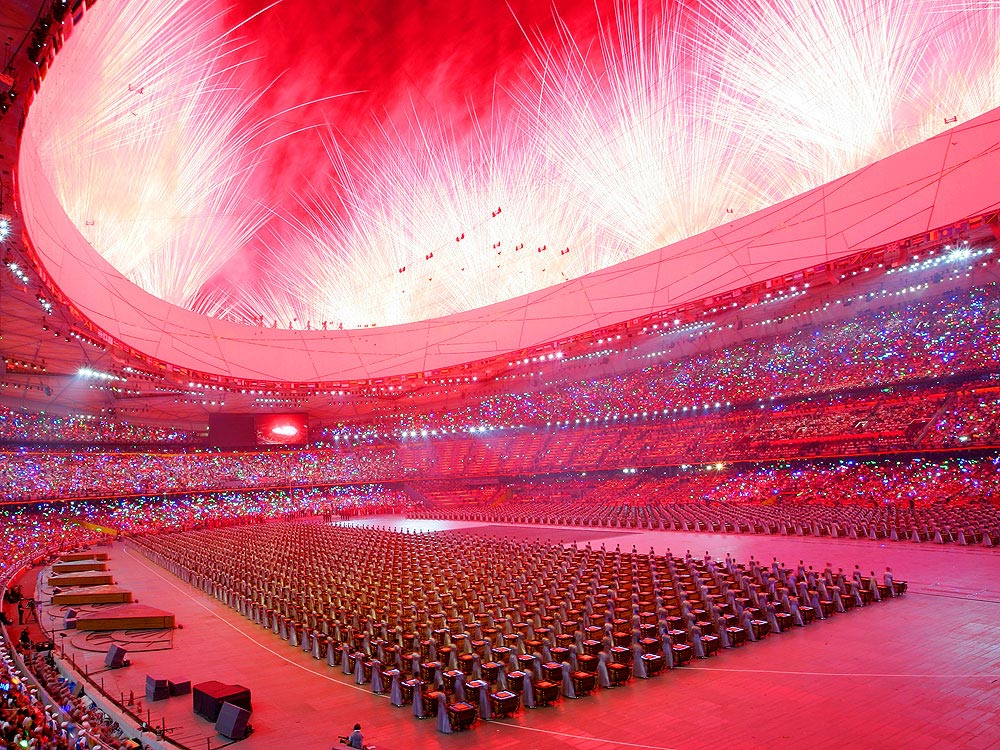
- Fireworks during the opening ceremony
- Date: 8 August 2008; 18 years ago
- Time: 20:00 – 00:09 CST (UTC+08:00)
- Venue: Beijing National Stadium
- Location: Beijing, China; 39°59′30″N 116°23′26″E
- Filmed by: Beijing Olympic Broadcasting (BOB)
- Footage: Full opening ceremony on the IOC YouTube channel on YouTube

The opening ceremony of the 2008 Summer Olympics was held at the Beijing National Stadium, also known as the Bird's Nest. It began at 20:00 (8:00 PM) China Standard Time (UTC+08:00), on 8 August 2008, due to the significance of the number 8, which is considered to be auspicious and is furthermore associated with prosperity and confidence in Chinese culture. The artistic part of the ceremony comprised two parts titled "Brilliant Civilization" and "Glorious Era" respectively. The first part highlighted Chinese civilization and the second part exhibited modern China and its dream of harmony between the people of the world. The stadium was full to its 91,000 capacity according to organizers.

The ceremony was directed by Chinese filmmaker Zhang Yimou, who was the chief director, and whose international reputation rests partly on work banned in China. He was assisted by Chinese choreographers Zhang Jigang and Chen Weiya. The director of music for the ceremony was composer Chen Qigang. It was noted for its focus on ancient Chinese culture (with the Communist revolution being largely omitted). The final ascent to the torch featured Olympic gymnast Li Ning, who appeared to run through air around the membrane of the stadium. Featuring 15,000 performers, the ceremony lasted over four hours (4:09, second only to Sydney 2000) and was reported to have cost over US$100 million to produce.

The Ceremony was also notable for using weather modification technology to prevent rainfall. Using cloud seeding, the government ordered over 1000 misses filled with silver iodide to surround the city. They were assisted by three aircraft. The goal was to cause potential storms to release the rain before it reached the stadium.

The opening ceremony was broadly praised by the international press as spectacular, and as the best ever Olympic opening ceremony. It drew rave reviews despite controversy, and a worldwide TV audience variously estimated, but likely over a billion. The ceremonies were also criticised for their militarism, high cost, historical revisionism, and lack of humour.

The opening ceremony can also be considered an important branding initiative for China. In 2014, the Beijing Olympics opening ceremony and Zhang Yimou were collectively awarded a Peabody Award for the "spell-binding, unforgettable celebration of the Olympic promise".

== Creative team ==
The creative team for the opening and closing ceremonies of the Beijing 2008 Olympic and Paralympic Games consisted of a roster of renowned individuals. The artistic performance of the Opening Ceremony, titled the "Beautiful Olympics", had the internationally acclaimed filmmaker Zhang Yimou as General Director, and Zhang Jigang and Chen Weiya as Deputy General Directors. Its core planning team comprised some of the best artists and technology experts in the world, including Yu Jianping, Lu Jiankang, Cai Guoqiang, Chen Qigang, British stagecraft designer Mark Fisher, Chen Yan, Sha Xiaolang, Japanese designer Eiko Ishioka, Xu Jiahua, Cheng Xiaodong, and Tan Dun. Jennifer Wen Ma was the youngest member of the creative team, and Chief Designer for Visual and Special Effects for the Opening Ceremony.

After working in collaboration with Artistic Director Zhang Yimou on his original creative and production proposal to the Beijing Organizing Committee for the Olympic Games (BOCOG), David Zolkwer, Project Director for the Athens 2004 Olympic Games ceremonies, was formally commissioned to provide ongoing Creative and Production consultancy for the Opening Ceremony directly to BOCOG along with colleagues Mik Auckland (Technical) and Celia Smith (Production) – all of whom worked for Jack Morton Worldwide at the time.

In 2006, BOCOG initially chose American filmmaker Steven Spielberg, Yves Pepin, head of the French entertainment group ECA2, and Sydney Games opening ceremony director Ric Birch as special consultants. In February 2008, Spielberg pulled out of his role as advisor in protest over China's alleged continuing support of the Sudanese government and the ongoing violence in the Darfur region. American composer Quincy Jones decided to stay on and contribute to the Beijing Olympics, in the hopes of influencing policy through engagement. Taiwanese filmmaker Ang Lee was also part of the team creating the opening and closing ceremonies of the Games; his nationality was omitted from official statements.

Gillian Chung was originally scheduled to be a performer at the opening ceremony, but due to the Edison Chen photo scandal, director Zhang Yimou replaced her and her partner, Charlene Choi (not involved in the photo incident) with the C-pop act A-One. A-One was not a part of the performances on 8 August.

== Proceedings ==
=== Prelude ===
The People's Liberation Army Navy Band performed the "Welcome March" song to welcome International Olympic Committee members and Chinese paramount leader Hu Jintao.

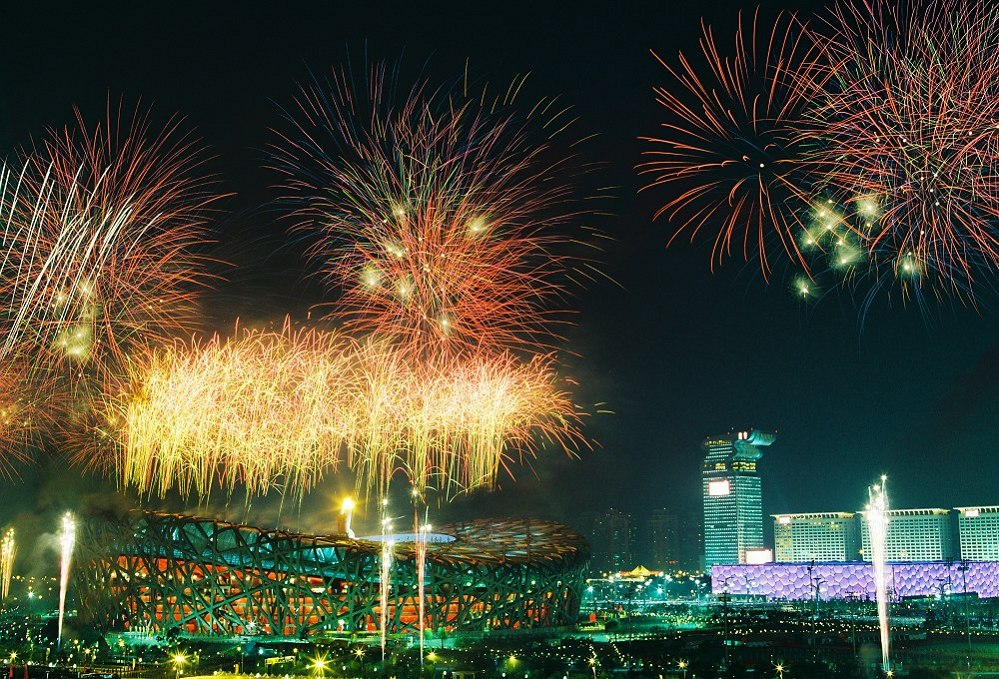
Fireworks display

The proceedings began by a flame and an ancient Chinese sundial, awakened by the light of time from the sky, lights up 2008 bronze Fou drums. The drums, running like a time machine, formed giant digits (in both Hindu–Arabic and Chinese numerals) to count down the seconds to the Games. The digits were formed at ten-second intervals starting from sixty before switching over to one-second intervals for the final ten seconds. At the end, a huge fireworks display was set off at the top of the stadium.

=== Welcoming ceremony – The Song-Fou ===
The 2,008 drummers played the bronze Fou drums and sang lyrics that quoted from The Analects of Confucius: "Isn't it delightful to have friends coming from afar?".

=== Footprints of History and Olympic Rings ===
The firework footprints were set off at the rate of one every second; each represented one of the 29 Olympiads, signifying the Beijing Olympics as the XXIX Olympiad of the modern era. The 29th footprint arrived at Bird's Nest and transformed into Star Olympic Rings. Next, the rings were lift up by twenty "Dunhuang fairies" (Mahayana Chan (Zen) Chinese Buddhist apsaras of the Mogao Caves).

=== National flag-raising ceremony ===
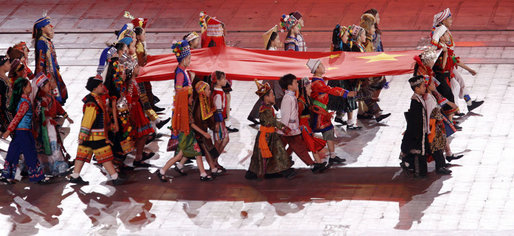
China's national flag carried into the National Stadium

Attention was then turned to 56 young children representing the 56 ethnic groups of modern China, and wearing respective costumes. They marched in the flag of the People's Republic of China as a young girl in red, nine-year-old Lin Miaoke, was seen performing "Ode to the Motherland", miming to the voice of Yang Peiyi. Only one-third of "Ode to the Motherland" was sung, to save time. The flag of the People's Republic of China was then handed over to eight well-dressed PLAGF Honor Guard Soldiers who carried the flag in a slow, goose-stepping march over to the flag podium, and the Chinese national anthem "March of the Volunteers" was sung by a 224-member choir while the flag was unfurled and raised, with red and yellow fireworks going off at the end.

=== Artistic section ===
The theme of the Artistic section was China's history and art.

==== Scroll Painting ====
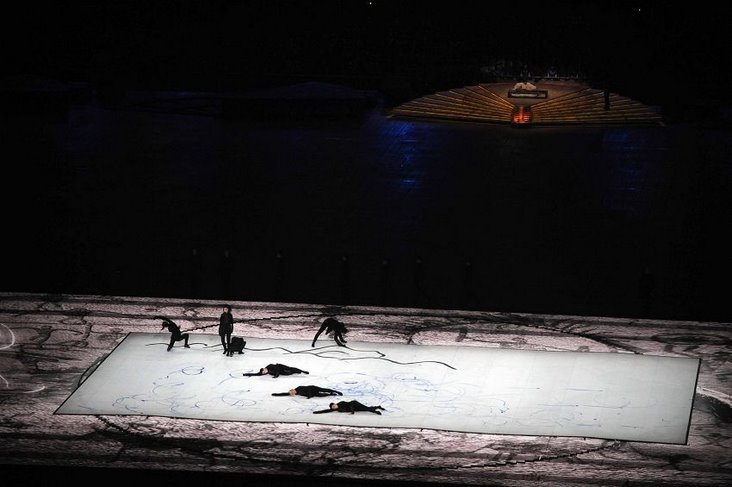
Dancers painting on the scroll

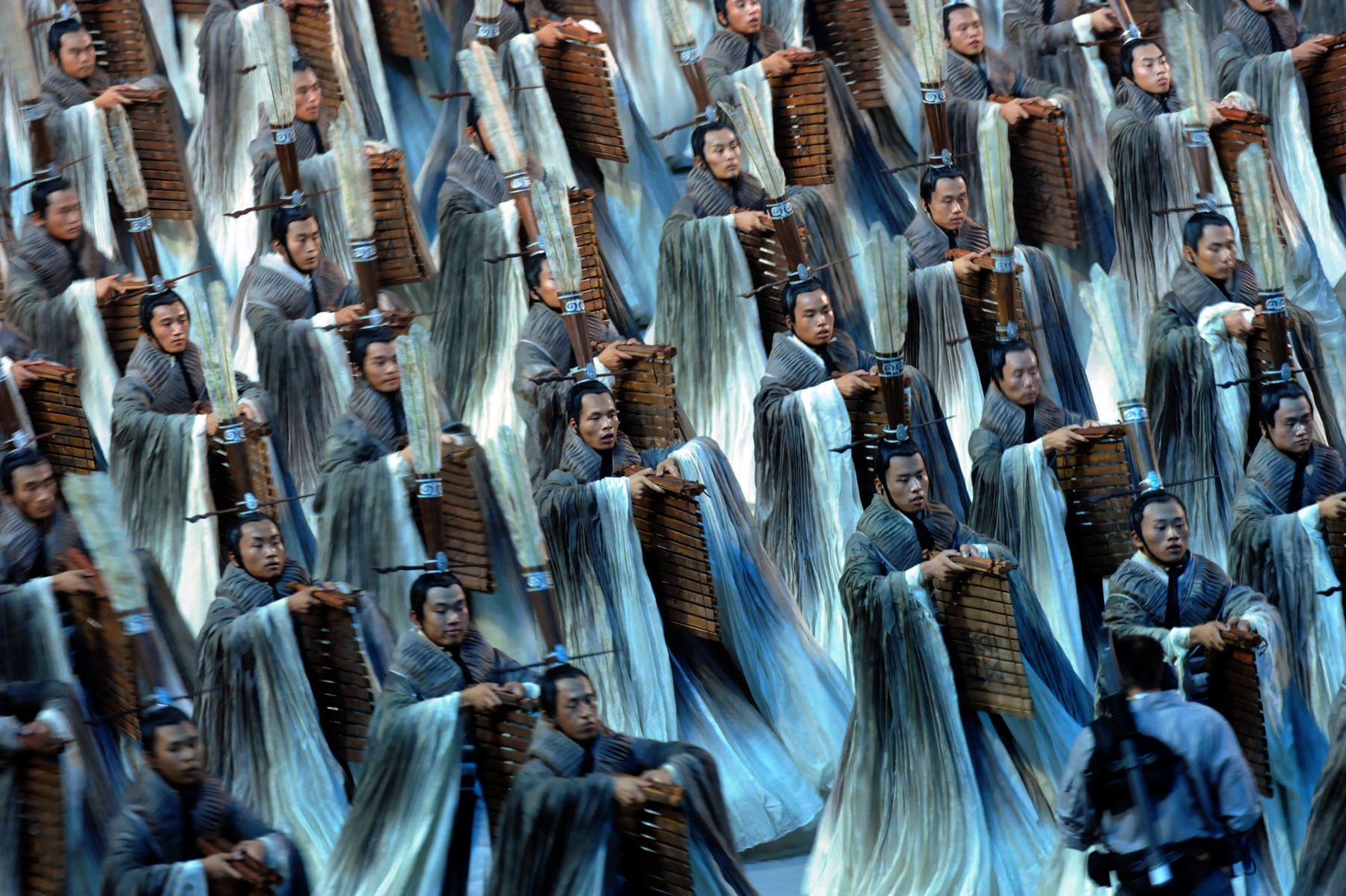
The disciples of Confucius chanted a famous quote from the Analects, translated as "All those within the four seas can be considered his brothers."

At the prelude to the section, Beautiful Olympics, a short film, was screened depicting the making of paper, another of the Four Great Inventions, ending with a rolled-up scroll painting to set the stage for the next segment. Ceramics, porcelain vessels and other Chinese fine arts artifacts were beamed on a giant LED scroll, representing the first of the Four Great Inventions of China, paper, and displaying animated graphics, slowly unfurling. At its center was a piece of white canvas paper, which then ushered in a performance of black-costumed dancers whose hands hid brushes that had been dipped in ink. They performed a dance while leaving their trails on the block of white paper, reminiscent of Chinese ink and wash painting. This was accompanied by the sounds of the guqin, China's ancient seven-string zither, as played by Chen Leiji (S: 陈雷激, T: 陳雷激, P: Chén Léijī). The LED scroll then showed an old, rare painting by Wang Ximeng.

==== Written character ====
The giant scroll was then moved aside to show a fluid array 897 movable type blocks that formed three variations of the character 和 (Hé "harmony"), representing the third great Chinese invention: the movable type press. The character was shown, consecutively, in bronze inscription, Seal script and KaisScript (Modern Chinese script). Performers in Zhou-era clothing representing the "3000 Disciples of Confucius", carrying bamboo slips, recited excerpts from the Analects: "Isn't it great to have friends coming from afar?" (Chinese: 有朋自远方来，不亦乐乎?; pinyin: Yǒupéng zì yuǎnfāng lái, bù yì lè hū) and "All men are brothers within the Four Seas" (Chinese: 四海之內，皆兄弟也; pinyin: Sìhǎi zhī nèi, jiē xiōngdì yě). The blocks changed into a small version of the Great Wall, which then sprouted peach blossoms, the Chinese symbol for openness. At the end of the sequence the tops of the movable type blocks came off to reveal 897 performers, who waved vigorously to the crowds, indicating that the individual pieces of type block were not computer controlled and synchronized, but rather the combined efforts of 897 perfectly in-sync performers.

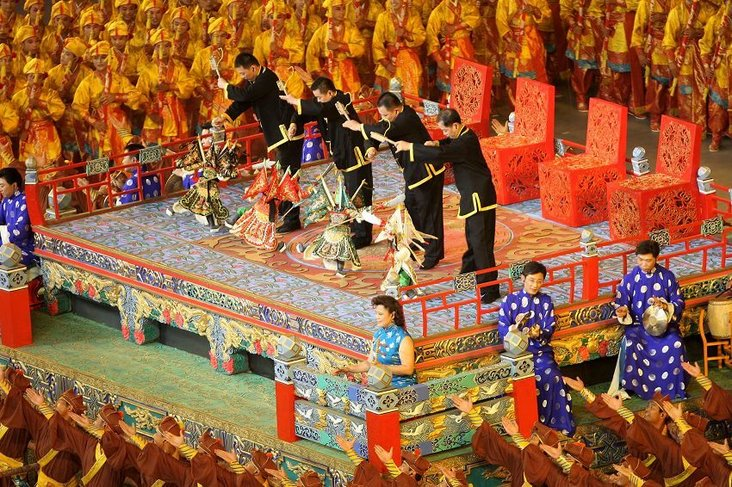
A scene of Beijing opera performers

==== Opera ====
The next segment saw ancient terracotta soldiers and Chinese opera, followed by a Beijing opera puppetry performance. The Wusheng type of Beijing opera performers was also enacted.

==== Silk Road ====
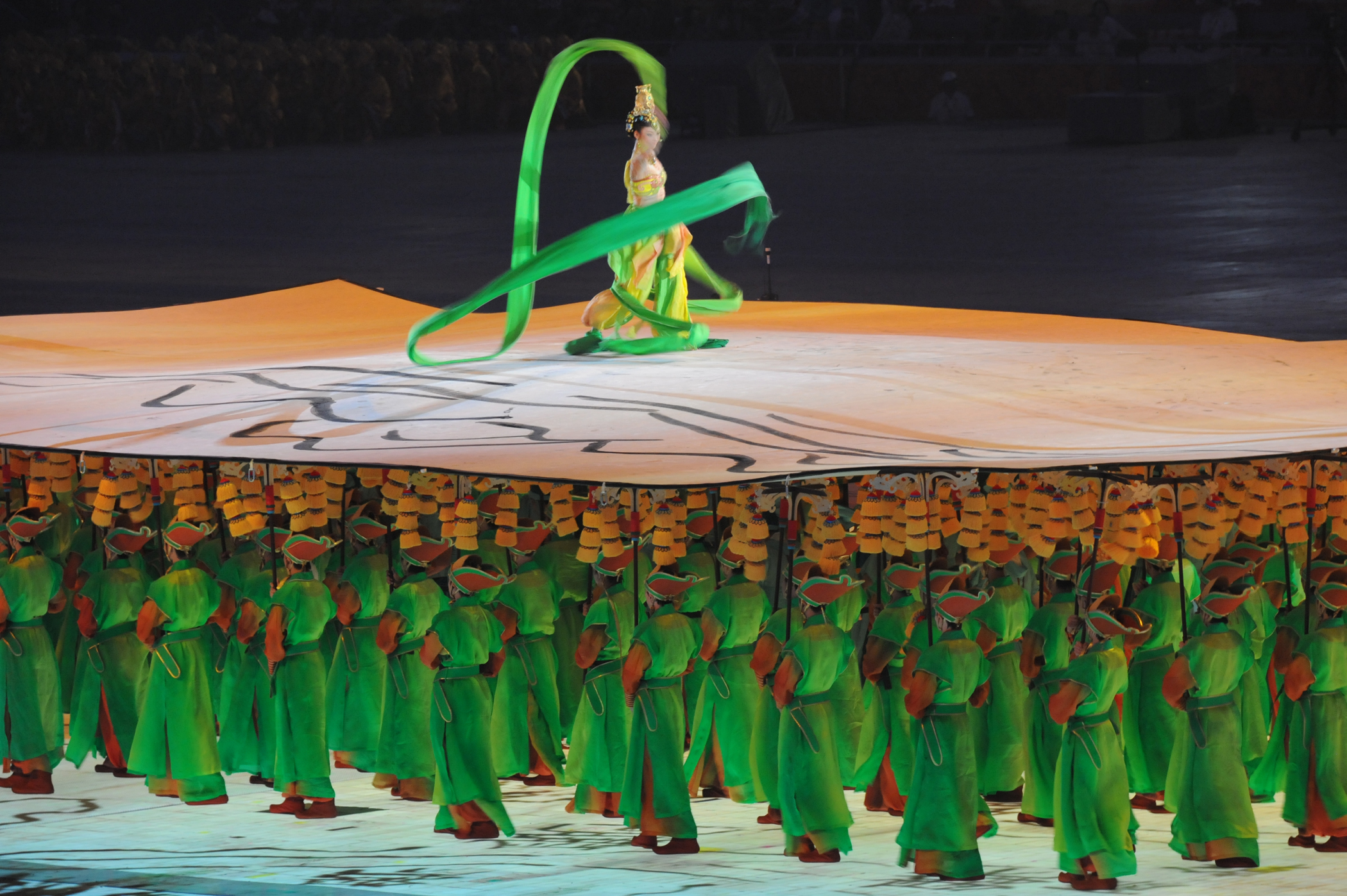
Silk Road segment

A Dunhuang fairy danced on the paper—which had been recoloured as a golden desert by projected illumination, and was held up by hundreds of men in clothing of ancient diplomatic envoys. A giant scroll showed the ancient Silk Road.

The ceremony featured the expeditions of Zheng He. The unfolding of the scroll was followed by a procession of men, in blue costumes, who with huge oars formed formations of junks, symbolizing the expeditions of Zheng He. A performer holding another great Chinese invention, the compass (in its ancient form of a metal spoon floating in vessel), danced in the center of the giant LED scroll that showed images of sailing junks and maps of Zheng He's seven voyages on Maritime Silk Road in the Ming dynasty.

==== Li and Yue (Ritual and Music) ====
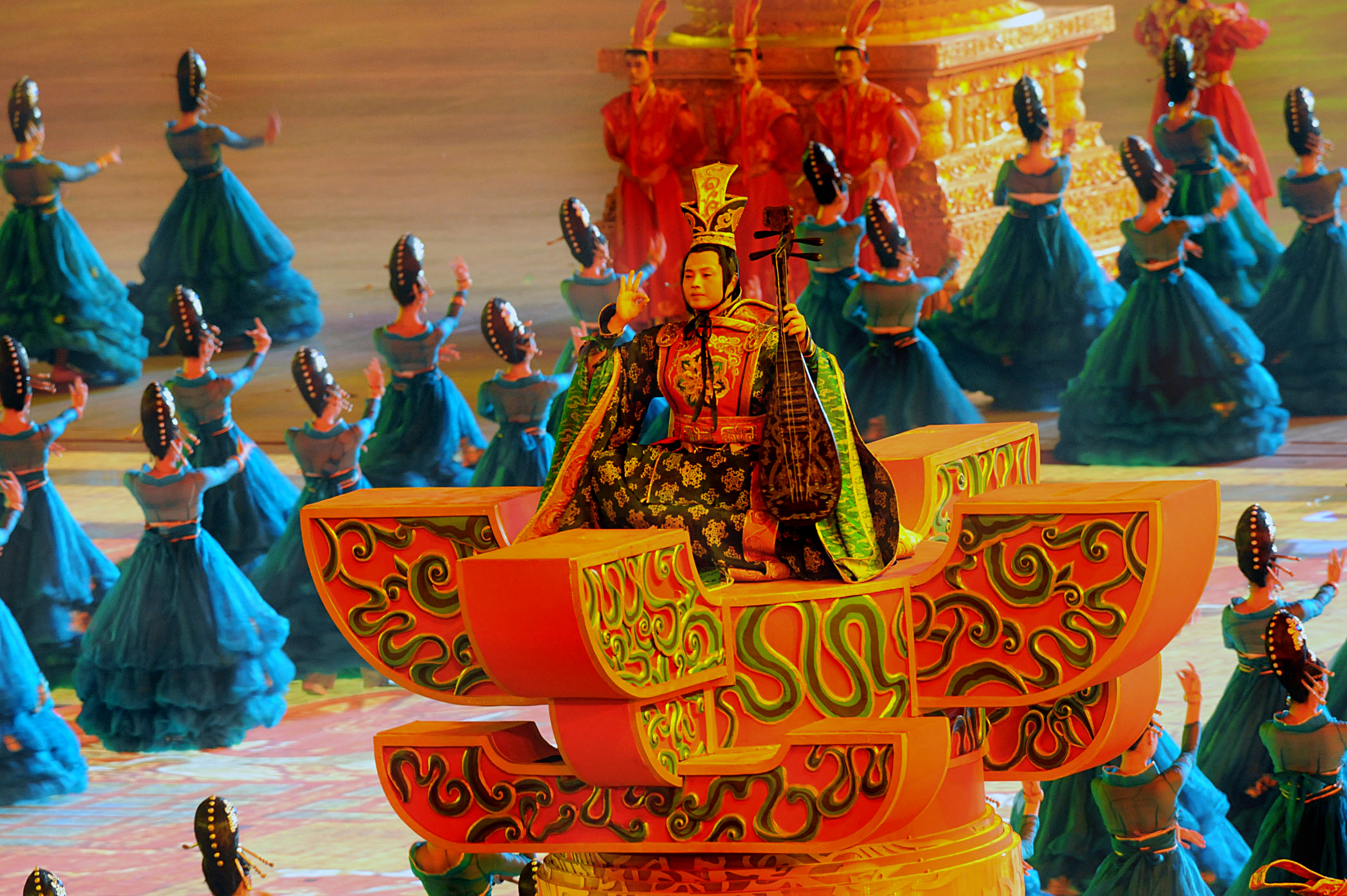
Actors' performance on top of a huabiao

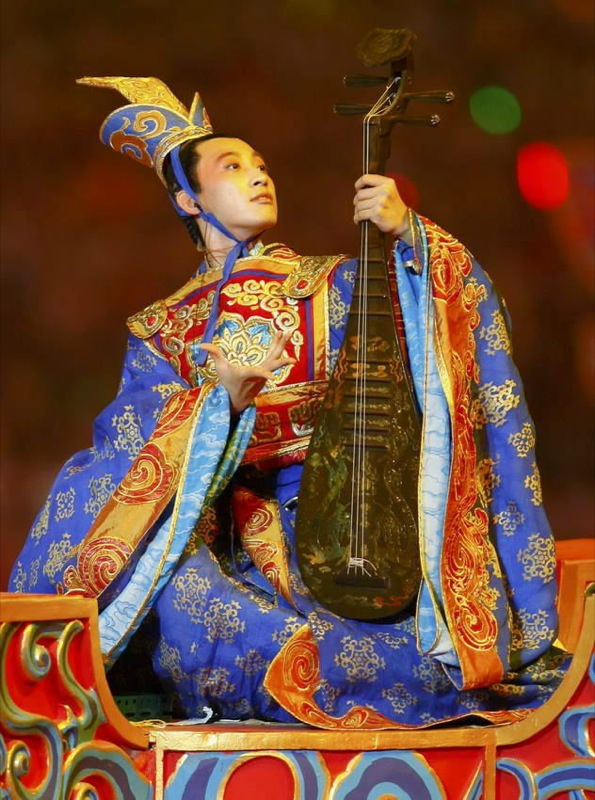
A musician playing pipa

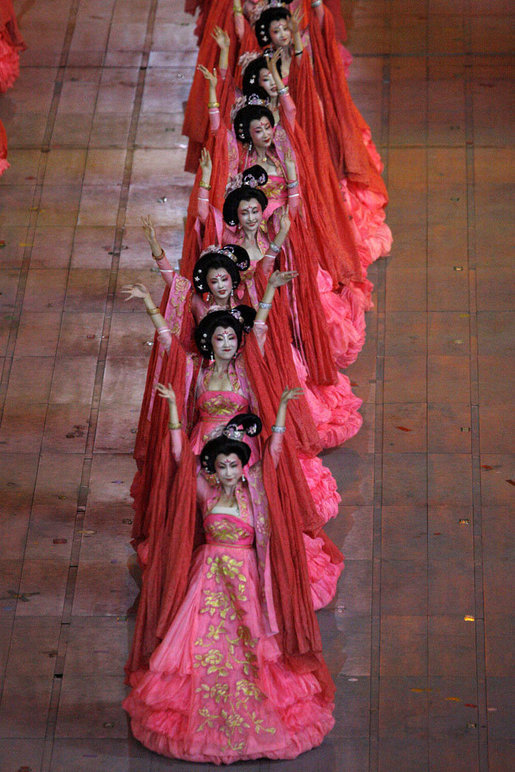
Ending segment of the first half "Brilliant Civilization" before the second half "Glorious Era"

This segment represented the prosperity of ancient China as "The State of Li and Yue." Accompanied by the music of Kunqu, one of the oldest extant Chinese operas, the giant scroll expanded and showed several beautiful classic ancient paintings from the Tang, Song, Yuan, Ming and Qing dynasties. At this point, two rows of huge royal dragon pillars called huabiao emerged, and stretched skyward, with the performers dancing to the ancient tune Flowery Moonlit River in Spring, as pink and orange fireworks were set off overhead.

==== Starlight ====
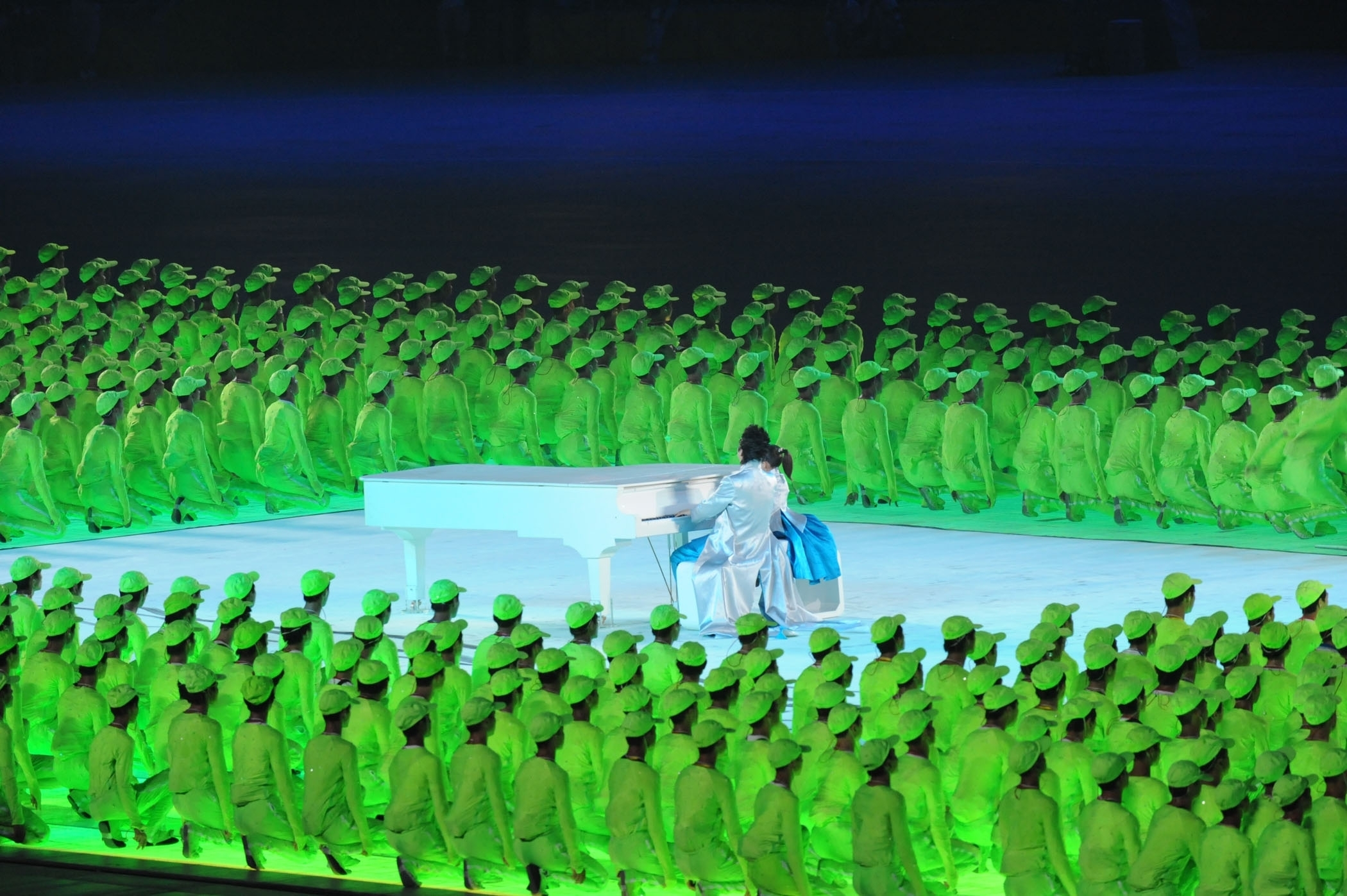
Lang Lang playing together with five-year-old Li Muzi on a white grand piano

Then followed the modern segment where pianist Lang Lang and five-year-old Li Muzi performed a melody from the Yellow River Cantata. Around the pianists a sea of rainbow-coloured luminescent performers swayed in wave-like unison to suggest the flow of the Yellow River. The illuminated performers, symbolizing modern-day China, then arranged themselves in the shape of the Dove of Peace, which wings were then set into motion as the performers moved about. They formed the bird's nest shape of the Beijing National Stadium. When a young girl flew a kite – also a Chinese invention – above them in mid-air, the performers' lights flickered in an intricate pattern.

==== Nature ====
A Tai chi performance by 2,008 masters illustrated harmony with nature. They demonstrated martial arts while combining to form geometric mass human formations. A skit was shown with schoolchildren drawing and coloring on the paper scroll and chanting poetry. These were the same children who had represented the 56 ethnic groups of China. They symbolized a Green Olympics (to protect the world). As their sequence drew to an end, the giant white paper was lifted vertically to reveal a drawing of mountains and waters, with a smiling face as the sun. Then, there was an illumination showing brightly coloured flying birds, symbolizing the rebirth of the phoenix and the bird-nest stadium itself.

==== Dream ====
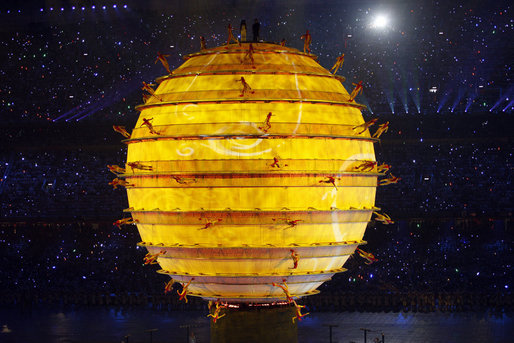
Performers dance on the surface of an illuminated sphere in the middle of the National Stadium

The next segment was a celestial show and the arrival of astronauts symbolizing Chinese space exploration, with a gigantic, 60-foot, 16-tonne ball structure representing the Earth. 58 acrobats tumbled rightside up, sideways or upside down on its surface. It was then transformed into a giant glowing Chinese lantern.

==== Theme song ====
Chinese singer Liu Huan and British singer Sarah Brightman stood on the central platform and sang the 2008 Olympic theme song: "You and Me."

2,008 performers then held out parasols with smiling faces of young children. This was followed by red and orange fireworks in the form of smiley faces. The representatives from the 56 ethnic groups danced a vigorous folk dance.

=== Parade of Nations ===
The athletes taking part in the XXIX Olympiad parade of nations walked out to the centre of the stadium.

In accordance with Olympic tradition, the national team of Greece, which hosted the last Summer Olympics, in Athens, entered first, in honor of Greece's status as the birthplace of the Olympics, while China, as the host country, came last. Traditionally nations are ordered in alphabetic order of the national language of the host country (or if there is more than one, the more dominant of the languages of the host city); as Chinese writing is not alphabetic, the teams paraded by stroke order of the first character of their respective countries' names in Simplified Chinese.

Countries with the same number of strokes in the first character are sorted by the order of the five basic strokes in Chinese characters (一,丨,丿,丶 and 乙). If the name of two or more countries has the same first character, then they are ordered according to the stroke order of the second character. For example, Latvia (Chinese: 拉脱维亚), Great Britain (Chinese: 英国), and British Virgin Islands (Chinese: 英属维尔京群岛) were the 114th, 115th and 116th to enter respectively while the first characters of their names are all eight strokes. However, the stroke order of Latvia's first character (拉) is 一丨一丶一丶丿一 while that of Great Britain is 一丨丨丨乙一丿丶. Latvia's third stroke (一) is before that of Great Britain (丨), which gave Latvia precedence to Great Britain. Great Britain and the British Virgin Islands share the same first character, 英. However the second one in Great Britain's name is 国, which has 8 strokes, while the second in British Virgin Islands is 属, which has 12 strokes. Thus Great Britain entered before British Virgin Islands. Guinea (Chinese: 几内亚) was the second country to enter following Greece as it only takes two strokes to write the first character in the country's name (几). Australia (Chinese: 澳大利亚) entered 202nd, just ahead of Zambia (Chinese: 赞比亚), which was the last country to enter before China. The first characters of these countries' names (澳 and 赞) are written with 15 and 16 strokes respectively.

Announcers in the stadium read off the names of the nations in French, English (the official languages of the Olympics), and Standard Chinese with music accompanying the athletes as they entered the stadium. The leading signs of delegations, carried by young Chinese women in red dresses, had their names printed in these three languages: the Chinese version in traditional Chinese calligraphy; and above it in the other two languages, using a Roman alphabetic typeface that mimicked brush calligraphy.

Chinese names of most states were condensed to their short forms when possible. For example, Bosnia and Herzegovina (波斯尼亚和黑塞哥维那) entered as 波黑 Bōhēi in Chinese, while Saudi Arabia (沙特阿拉伯) entered as simply 沙特 Shātè. One exception was the Former Yugoslav Republic of Macedonia, which entered in Chinese as its full designation (前南斯拉夫马其顿共和国) because of the Macedonia naming dispute (though the country was sorted according to its short name, 马其顿). China entered as People's Republic of China/République populaire de Chine in English and French, but simply as 中国 Zhōngguó in Chinese, the most common short name.

The athletes walked along the tracks toward the center of the stadium, which was encircled by white-capped Chinese cheerleaders welcoming each contingent. As they did so, they would step on colored ink before treading on the Chinese painting done earlier by the children and the performance artists.

Throughout the entire Parade of Nations, the Olympic athletes were treated to live traditional music ensembles, hand-picked by the Chinese Olympic committee from around the world. Each ensemble represented a continent from the five Olympic rings. The groups included Chinese orchestra, Scottish bagpipers Mains of Fintry Pipe Band (Fintry Pipe Band), Aboriginal musicians and dancers from Australia (William Barton), South African drummers (Drum Cafe), and North American mariachi group Mariachi Mujer 2000.

Unlike in previous years, North and South Korea did not send a unified team; their athletes entered separately as Republic of Korea (South Korea, Chinese: 韩国) and the Democratic People's Republic of Korea (North Korea, Chinese: 朝鲜民主主义人民共和国; pinyin: Cháoxiǎn mínzhǔ zhǔyì rénmín gònghéguó). Taiwan marched under the name "Chinese Taipei" (Chinese: 中华台北; pinyin: Zhōnghuá Táiběi) as per a 1989 agreement and in the Olympics since then – and the Chinese media has followed suit, referring to Taiwan as Zhonghua Taibei instead of the previously used and controversial Zhongguo Taibei (Chinese: 中国台北; pinyin: Zhōngguó Táiběi, literally "Taipei, China").

The Chinese contingent, which was last, was led by Yao Ming and Lin Hao, a 9-year-old primary school student who had rescued two schoolmates during the 2008 Sichuan earthquake.

=== Protocol ===
Liu Qi, the President of the Beijing Organizing Committee for the Olympic Games, gave a speech in Mandarin welcoming the athletes. Jacques Rogge, the President of the International Olympic Committee (IOC), followed with a speech in English, praising the Chinese for their warm reception and effort and urging athletes to "have fun" and to reject doping and performance enhancement drugs. This reminder was reiterated in French. Afterward, Hu Jintao, the paramount leader of China, formally declared the Olympics open in Mandarin:

Chinese: "我宣布，北京第29届奥林匹克运动会…开幕！"; pinyin: Wǒ xuānbù, běijīng dì èrshíjiǔ jiè àolínpǐkè yùndònghuì…kāimù; lit. 'I declare the XXIX Olympic Games of Beijing... open!'

— Hu Jintao, President of the People's Republic of China

=== Olympic flag ===
Afterward, the Olympic flag was carried in by eight former athletes from China. They were:

- Zhang Xielin (table tennis)
- Pan Duo (Everest mountaineer)
- Zheng Fengrong (athletics)
- Yang Yang (A) (short-track speed skating)
- Yang Ling (shooting)
- Mu Xiangxiong (swimming)
- Xiong Ni (diving)
- Li Lingwei (badminton)

They then passed on the flag to the soldiers of the People's Liberation Army (the PLA) and the Olympic anthem sung while the flag was being raised, with a multinational choir of 80 children performed the anthem in Greek. They are the same children who escorted the Chinese flag and sang the national anthem on the earlier stage. Chinese table tennis champion Zhang Yining and arbiter Huang Liping took the Olympic oath, representing the athletes and officials respectively.

There was a short dance presentation, followed by bright yellow fireworks – representing the release of doves of peace.

=== Torch relay and lighting of the Olympic cauldron ===
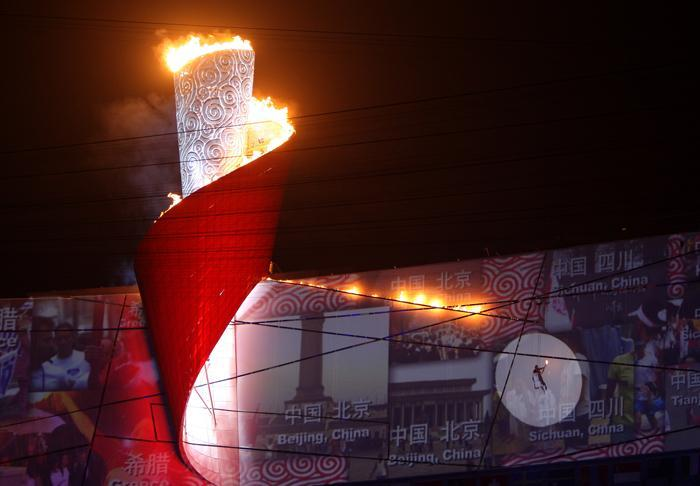
Lighting of the cauldron by Li Ning

At this point, the Olympic flame entered the stadium as a continuation of the Beijing relay leg from the outside. The Olympic torch was relayed around the stadium by seven athletes, and was finally passed on to Li Ning, the former Olympic gymnast champion, the eighth and final athlete.

The eight athletes were, in order:

- Xu Haifeng (shooting, China's first Olympic gold medalist in any event, 1984)
- Gao Min (diving, China's first repeat Olympic gold medalist in any event, 1988 and 1992)
- Li Xiaoshuang (gymnastics, China's first gymnastics all-around World Champion and Olympic gold medalist, 1992 and 1996)
- Zhan Xugang (weightlifting, China's first double Olympic gold medalist in weightlifting, 1996 and 2000)
- Zhang Jun (badminton, double Olympic gold medalist in mixed doubles badminton, 2000 and 2004)
- Chen Zhong (taekwondo, China's first and double taekwondo gold medalist, 2000 and 2004)
- Sun Jinfang (volleyball, member of team that won China's first major championship in a team sport)
- Li Ning (gymnastics, China's most decorated athlete at its first Olympics, 1984)

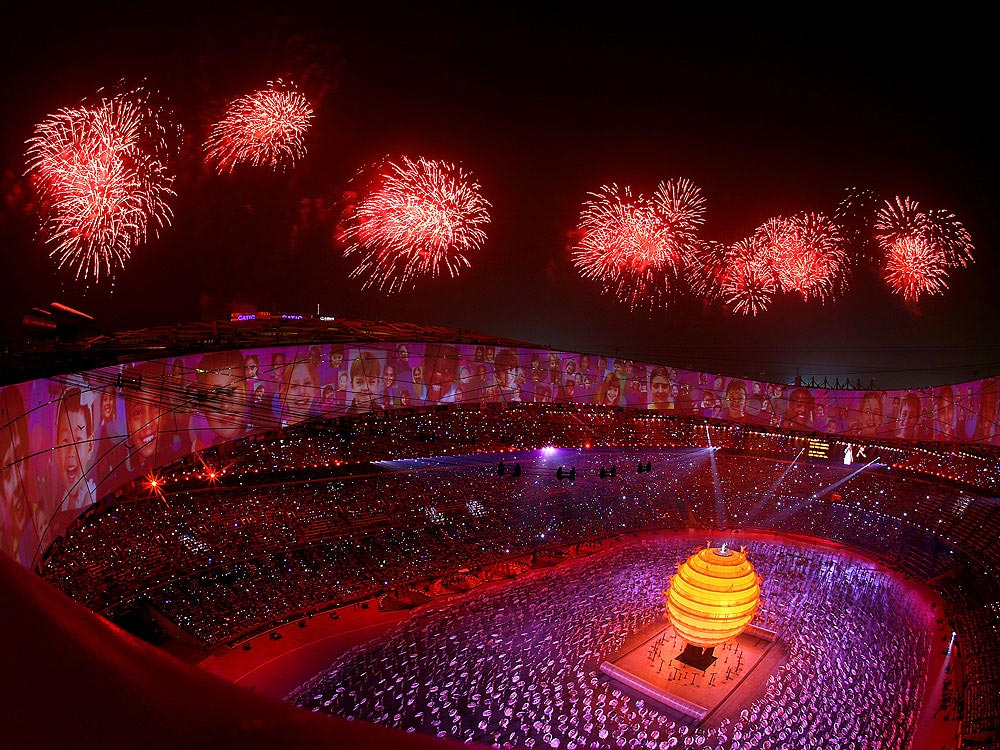
The hidden cauldron is pictured at this photo (on the left side)

Li Ning, who was suspended by wires, then appeared to run horizontally along the walls of the stadium through to the Olympic cauldron, which at this moment was still not shown. As he ran along the upper wall of the stadium, the projection displayed a scroll opening ahead of him, on which was beamed footage of the entire torch relay. At the final moment, a spotlight revealed the final resting place of the Olympic flame, which had appeared during the torch run. A colossal torch situated at the top of the stadium was lit by a proportionately large fuse.

A flurry of spectacular fireworks of various colours and shapes, some projecting Olympic rings, others forming hoops, flower outwards, fountain or float down, accompanied the ending of the ceremony. The ceremony ended at 12:09 am, 9 August 2008 CST, which was later than the time originally planned: 11:30 pm, 8 August.

=== Encore ===
As the audience started to exit the stadium, singers from Mainland China and Hong Kong came onto the stage to provide music as a way to stall the audience from leaving all at once. Jackie Chan, Karen Mok, Han Hong, and Sun Nan sang the first song, "Stand Up", while Andy Lau, Nicolas Tse, Joey Yung, Wakin Chau, Wang Feng, and Sun Yue sang the second song, "Cheering for Life." Since the ceremony was already over time by then, this portion was not televised in the CCTV coverage; however, it could still be partially heard in BBC and NBC coverage.

== Anthems ==
- A choir of 224 singers from 56 ethnic groups of China - National Anthem of the People's Republic of China
- (International Olympic Committee) A choir of multinational children from 56 ethnic groups of China - Olympic Hymn

== Dignitaries and other officials in attendance ==
Over 105 heads of state and government and five leaders of international organizations attended the opening ceremony. The opening ceremony held a record for the largest number of attending foreign heads of state in Olympic history and the largest gathering of world leaders for a sporting event, until surpassed by the 2012 ceremony four years later.

The following dignitaries were confirmed to be present at the ceremony:

- Hamid Karzai, President of Afghanistan
- Sali Berisha, Prime Minister of Albania
- Abdelaziz Bouteflika, President of Algeria
- Albert Pintat, Prime Minister of Andorra
- José Eduardo dos Santos, President of Angola
- Serzh Sargsyan, President of Armenia
- Kevin Rudd, Prime Minister of Australia
- Ilham Aliyev, President of Azerbaijan
- Moeen U Ahmed, Chief of General Staff of Bangladesh
- Alexander Lukashenko, President of Belarus
- Prince Philippe of Belgium
- Haris Silajdžić, Chairman of the Presidency of Bosnia and Herzegovina
- Luiz Inácio Lula da Silva, President of Brazil
- Georgi Parvanov, President of Bulgaria
- Pierre Nkurunziza, President of Burundi
- King Norodom Sihamoni of Cambodia
- Stjepan Mesić, President of Croatia
- Demetris Christofias, President of Cyprus
- Frank Bainimarama, Interim Prime Minister of Fiji
- Matti Vanhanen, Prime Minister of Finland
- Nicolas Sarkozy, President of France
  - Bernard Accoyer, President of the French National Assembly
- Gerhard Schröder, former Chancellor of Germany
- Ahmed Tidiane Souaré, Prime Minister of Guinea
- M. S. Gill, Minister of Youth Affairs and Sports of India
- Shimon Peres, President of Israel
- Yasuo Fukuda, Prime Minister of Japan
- Kim Yong-nam, President of the Presidium of the Supreme People's Assembly of North Korea
- Lee Myung-bak, President of South Korea
- Valdis Zatlers, President of Latvia
- Choummaly Sayasone, President of Laos
- Marc Ravalomanana, President of Madagascar
- Mizan Zainal Abidin, Yang di-Pertuan Agong of Malaysia, and Raja Permaisuri Agong Sultanah Nur Zahirah
- Sir Anerood Jugnauth, President of Mauritius
- Manny Mori, President of Micronesia
- Albert II, Sovereign Prince of Monaco
- Nawal El Moutawakel, Minister of Sports of Morocco
- Jan Peter Balkenende, Prime Minister of the Netherlands
- King Harald V and Queen Sonja of Norway
- Sir Anand Satyanand, Governor-General of New Zealand
  - Sir Frederick Tutu Goodwin, Queen's Representative in the Cook Islands
- Gloria Macapagal Arroyo, President of the Philippines
- Traian Băsescu, President of Romania
- Vladimir Putin, Prime Minister of Russia
- Tui Ātua Tupua Tamasese Efi, O le Ao o le Malo of Samoa
- Boris Tadić, President of Serbia
- S. R. Nathan, President of Singapore
  - Lee Kuan Yew, Minister Mentor of Singapore
- Ivan Gašparovič, President of Slovakia
- Miguel Ángel Moratinos, Minister of Foreign Affairs of Spain
- Mahinda Rajapaksa, President of Sri Lanka
- Pascal Couchepin, President of Switzerland
- Princess Maha Chakri Sirindhorn of Thailand
- Samak Sundaravej, Prime Minister of Thailand
- George W. Bush, President of the United States
- Kalkot Mataskelekele, President of Vanuatu
- Nguyễn Minh Triết, President of Vietnam

== Incidents and controversies ==
=== Accident during rehearsal ===
Liu Yan, one of China's top Chinese dancers, fell from a three-metre high platform during practice on 27 July 2008 and sustained severe spinal injuries. She was paralyzed waist-down after a six-hour operation. Despite her not performing in the ceremony proper, deputy director Zhang Jigang ensured Liu's name was written in the programme as the lead dancer.

In an interview after visiting Liu Yan in the hospital, Director Zhang Yimou said, "I feel sorry for Liu Yan, my heart is full of regrets, I'm deeply sorry. Liu Yan is a heroine. She sacrificed a lot for the Olympics, for me, for the opening ceremony." Shortly after the opening ceremony, in an earlier media interview, Zhang expressed: "I regret many things, many details of this performance, many things I could have done better. For example, there are performers who were injured. I blame myself for that."

=== Rehearsal leakage ===
The South Korean Seoul Broadcasting System (SBS) secretly filmed rehearsals of the opening ceremony and leaked parts of it, violating a prohibition by the Organizing Committee. The video was uploaded at YouTube on 30 July 2008, but was deleted soon after its upload. However, several additional videos have been uploaded by other users. The Organizing Committee investigated the unauthorized filming, and on 6 August 2008, banned SBS cameras inside the stadium during the ceremony as reprisals for the leak.

=== Girl lip-synching to recording by another singer ===
The song "Ode to the Motherland" appeared to be sung by Lin Miaoke at the ceremony, but it emerged she had mimed her performance to a recording by another girl, Yang Peiyi. It was a last-minute decision to use lip-syncing, following a Politburo member's objection to Lin's voice. IOC executive director Gilbert Felli defended the use of a more photogenic double. Although the names of both Lin Miaoke and Yang Peiyi appeared in the programme notes, the vast majority who watched the broadcast did not realise Yang Peiyi's role until several days later when music director Chen Qigang acknowledged it.

Performers at previous Olympic opening ceremonies had occasionally synced to recordings of their own performance, however never to that of another person. Examples include the tenor Luciano Pavarotti at the 2006 Winter Olympics in Turin, due to his pancreatic cancer. Then nine-year-old Eleonora Benetti also lip-synched to a previous recording of the Italian National Anthem. The Sydney Symphony Orchestra appeared to perform at the 2000 Summer Olympics in Sydney, but the music spectators heard was entirely pre-recorded, with some of the music pre-recorded by the Melbourne Symphony Orchestra.

=== Computer-simulated fireworks ===
Television coverage of the fireworks show which displayed the 29 firework "footprints" outside the stadium was simulated by computer animation. Twenty-nine sets of fireworks in the shape of a footprint did actually go off, but it was decided that it would be difficult and dangerous to get a good shot from helicopters capturing all 29 of the footsteps (which went off every two seconds), so a CGI of 27 of the footprints was made for television broadcasts, and only the last two were filmed live. The 55 seconds of display took the BOCOG a year to choreograph. The substitution of CGI footage was mentioned during the time-delayed U.S. broadcast of the ceremony on NBC by announcers Matt Lauer and Bob Costas.

=== Children representing minority groups ===
On 15 August, Wang Wei, the vice president of the BOCOG, confirmed that children who appeared in the opening ceremony in the costumes of the 56 ethnic groups of modern China did not belong to the ethnic minorities their costumes indicated, as described in publicity materials, but instead all or most were members of the majority Han Chinese. Wang said it was "traditional" and not unusual for actors in China to wear different ethnic costumes.

=== Blue screen of death ===
During the ceremony, many spectators saw a Windows XP blue screen of death projected onto the ceiling of the stadium for two hours. A photo of Li Ning, who lit the cauldron, passing the blue screen went viral.

== Reception ==
IOC President Rogge described the ceremony as "spectacular" and an "unforgettable and moving ceremony that celebrated the imagination, originality and energy of the Beijing Games." He furthermore hailed the Beijing National Stadium as "one of the world's new wonders" and a "fitting setting for an amazing Opening Ceremony." Hein Verbruggen, IOC Member and Chairman of the Coordination Commission for the Games of the XXIX Olympiad, called the ceremony "a night to remember", "a breathtaking culmination of seven years of planning and preparation" and "an unprecedented and grand success" that exceeded all his expectations.

Generally, both international and domestic media praised the production. Positive commentary often focused on the ceremony's use of human-powered technology and visually arresting style.

The AFP called it "a spectacular opening ceremony." The BBC and The Times concurred by calling it a dazzling and spectacular show in Beijing. The Associated Press praised the show as spectacular with an extravaganza of pageantry and "interlude of fervor and magic" as well as being "spellbinding" and noted the show steered clear of modern politics. The USA Today described it as an exhilarating display of China's thousands of years of traditions of art and culture, and the Art Daily stated it was a celebration of China's ancient history, along with sumptuous costumes from different imperial dynasties. Roger Ebert of the Chicago Sun-Times commented that "the scope, precision and beauty of the production was, you will agree, astonishing." The Spanish media were impressed by the opening ceremony, with Antena 3 describing the ceremony as "an astonishing effort," while Cuatro called it "awesome and impressive." Cadena COPE said it was "the most dramatic Olympic opening ceremony ever." Germany's Deutsche Welle also praised it as a spectacular and a firecracker of a show, and a trip through China's rich history.

Steven Spielberg called the show "an unforgettable spectacle" and "arguably the grandest spectacle of the new millennium." At the end of 2008, the American Film Institute selected the coverage of the 2008 Summer Olympics opening ceremony as one of their "Eight Moments of Significance" of the year of 2008, and states: "The opening ceremony, directed and staged by acclaimed Chinese filmmaker Zhang Yimou, marked the most significant live event of the year" and it described the opening ceremony as "staged with breathtaking poetry."

World leaders were also impressed by the opening ceremony. U.S. President George W. Bush described the ceremony as "spectacular and successful." Former British Prime Minister Tony Blair called it "the spectacular to end all spectaculars and probably can never be bettered."

While praise for the opening ceremony was widespread amongst the world's media, the Singaporean newspaper The Straits Times described some western media reactions as "cynical" and "hostile." The Globe and Mail had a column with title "The iron hand behind the magic show", some questioned the "heavy military theme," especially in Taiwan and Australia. A column in The Washington Post said that the expense of the opening ceremonies was higher than any democracy would or should spend. Asia Times, although praising the show as "stunning opening ceremony ... with its panoply of color, painstaking choreography and sweeping portrait of Chinese culture and history" referred to the games as one devoid of "fun" in its article headlined "Awe (but no laughter) in Beijing." The artist Ai Weiwei also criticized the ceremonies, comparing them unfavorably to the British Olympic ceremonies of 2012, which produced a sense of intimacy and a "clear understanding of what England was." Wendy Larson, scholar of Chinese literature at the University of Oregon, said that the thematic choices were purposeful and that the ceremony committee was merely attempting to emphasize Chinese aesthetics that emphasized the community and working together to produce a good result.

=== Television ===
Estimates of the global television audience varied: "around one billion" (Reuters); "experts estimated ... more than two billion" (The Wall Street Journal); "2.3 billion" (MindShare); "Billions ... probably the largest live television audience in history" (Bloomberg); "3 billion" (Sky News); "nearly 4 billion" (Xinhua); "as many as 4 billion" (The Washington Post); "estimated 4 billion" (McClatchy). This included an estimated 842 million viewers watching on host Chinese broadcaster China Central Television (CCTV), with polls ranging from 63 and 69 percent of the Chinese viewing population, exceeding that of the 51–58 percent who watch the network's annual Chinese New Year gala. The BBC reported five million viewers in the United Kingdom, the Seven Network had 7.8 million viewers in Australia, The Hollywood Reporter said 4.4 million in France watched the ceremony, the ARD estimated 7.72 million viewers in Germany, while in Italy, RAI had 5.5 million viewers, and in Spain, TVE obtained 4 million viewers. Rádio e Televisão de Portugal obtained 591 thousand viewers, a record breaking audience for RTP2, even surpassing programming from popular private broadcasters and its sister channel in the same time slot, with the tape delayed broadcast in the evening on RTP1 managing a more modest 4.4 rating and 20.4 share.

A report made a year later for the International Olympic Committee estimated that 1.5 billion people (including 739 million within China itself) watched at least one minute of the ceremony, and 1.4 billion worldwide watched at least 15 minutes.

In the United States, the NBC network delayed its telecast by 12 hours for evening primetime viewing, though Americans in markets bordering Canada could watch it on CBC Television, and others watched clips of it earlier on YouTube and other online video websites. Still, it managed to capture an average of 34.2 million viewers and a total of 69.9 million viewers.

The Opening Ceremonies in Beijing became the most watched Olympic Opening Ceremony ever held in a non-U.S. city by an American audience, a record previously held by the Lillehammer Games of 1994. It was the biggest television event in the U.S. in 2008 since the Super Bowl, and it also surpassed the ratings for the 2008 Academy Awards ceremony and that year's finale of American Idol.

In the United States, NBC concluded its broadcast with a message saying that their coverage of the opening ceremony was dedicated in memory of Jim McKay, longtime Olympics broadcaster with rival ABC, who died on 7 June. ABC "loaned" McKay to NBC to serve as a special correspondent during their coverage of the Salt Lake City Winter Olympics.

== See also ==
- 2008 Summer Olympics closing ceremony
- 2008 Summer Olympics national flag bearers
- 2022 Winter Olympics opening ceremony
- 2022 Winter Olympics closing ceremony
- Four Great Inventions
