= 2008 Summer Olympics torch relay route =

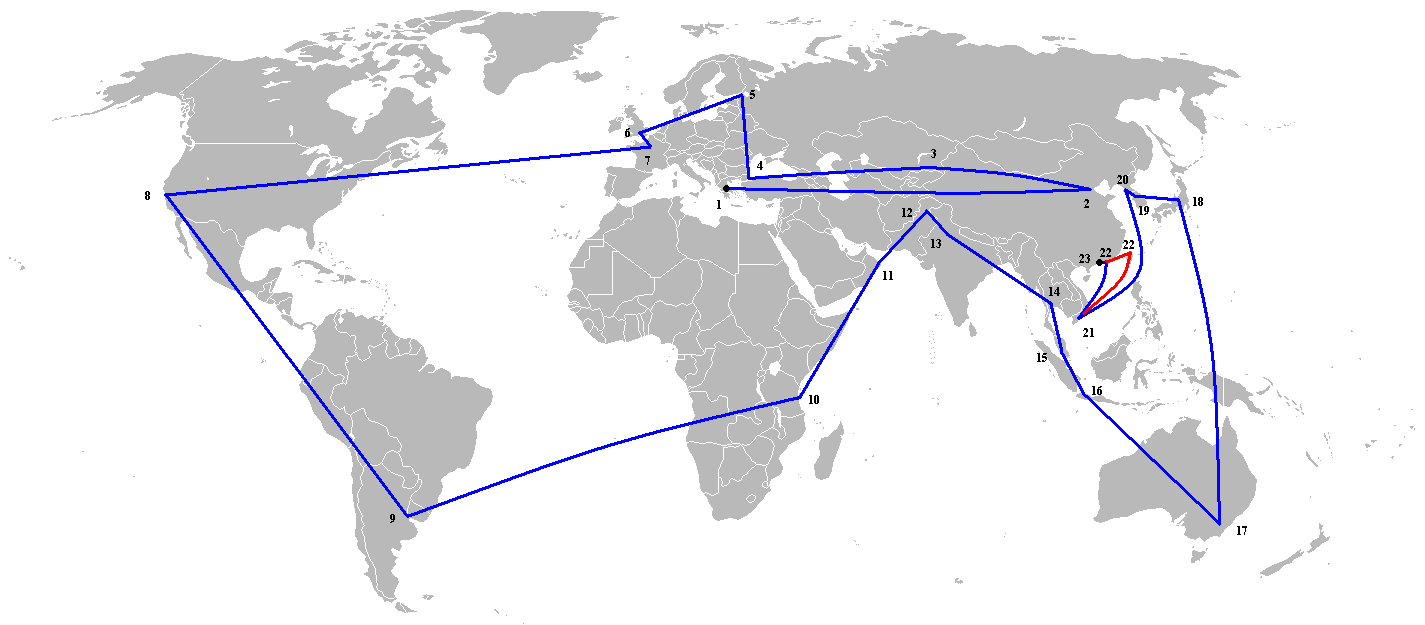
2008 Olympic Torch Relay. The cancelled Taiwan route is shown in red.

The 2008 Summer Olympics torch relay route involved 21 countries where the Olympic torch was carried between its lighting in Greece in March 2008 and the Olympic opening ceremony in China's host city of Beijing in August 2008. The relay took place in four separate legs: in Greece, an international leg, in the special administrative regions of China (Hong Kong and Macau), and in mainland China.

The planned route originally included a stop in Taipei between Ho Chi Minh City and Hong Kong, but there was disagreement in Beijing and Taipei over language used to describe whether it was an international or a domestic part of the route. While the Olympic committees of China and Chinese Taipei reached initial consensus on the approach, the government of the Republic of China in Taiwan intervened, stating that this placement could be interpreted as placing Taiwan on the same level as Hong Kong and Macau, an implication it objected to. The Beijing Organizing Committee attempted to continue negotiation, but further disputes arose over the flag or the anthem of the Republic of China along the 24 km torch route in Taiwan. By the midnight deadline for concluding the negotiation on September 21, 2007, Taiwan authorities and mainland China were unable to come to terms with the issue of the Torch Relay. In the end, both sides of the Taiwan Strait decided to eliminate the Taipei leg.

== Route in Greece ==
March 24
- Olympia
- Pyrgos
- Ilida
- Patras
- Missolonghi
March 25
- Missolonghi
- Agrinio
- Amfilochia
- Menidi
- Arta
- Ioannina
March 26
- Ioannina
- Metsovo
- Grevena
- Kozani
- Veria
March 27
- Veria
- Naousa
- Skydra
- Edessa
- Giannitsa
- Pella
- Thessaloniki
March 28
- Thessaloniki
- Dion
- Larisa
- Volos
- Lamia
March 29
- Lamia
- Ancient Amphiareion of Oropos ruins
- Marathon
- Rafina
- Athens
- Acropolis
March 30
- Panathenaic Stadium

== International and HK&Macau route ==
International torch relay route 2008 Olympic Torch Relay's international leg
Date	Country (city)	Length	Notable torchbearers	# of torchbearers
March 31	China (Beijing)		Hu Jintao – paramount leader of PRC; Liu Xiang – gold medalist hurdler	
April 2	Kazakhstan (Almaty) (start); Medeo (finish); Astana Square	20 km	Nursultan Nazarbaev – president of Kazakhstan; Bakhtiyar Artayev – gold medalist weightlifter Yermakhan Ibraimov – boxer Yuriy Melnichenko – gold medalist wrestler Anatoly Khrapaty – weightlifter Vladimir Smirnov – the first Olympic champion for independent Kazakhstan cross-country skiing Roza Rymbaeva – singer	80
April 3	Turkey (Istanbul) (start); Sultanahmet Square (finish); Taksim Square	20 km	Tuğba Karademir – figure skater Taner Sağır – champion weightlifter	80
April 5	Russia (St. Petersburg) (start); Victory Square (finish); Palace Square	20 km	Lyubov Yegorova – cross-country skiing Viktor Zhdanovich – fencing Vladimir Salnikov, Alexander Popov, Sergey Kopliakov, Andrey Krylov – gold medalist swimmer Alexander Dityatin – gold medalist artistic gymnastics Tatyana Kazankina – gold medalist runner Anatoly Alyabyev – gold medalist biathlon Evgeni Plushenko, Tatiana Totmianina, Maxim Marinin, Anton Sikharulidze, Alexei Urmanov, Oksana Kazakova, Artur Dmitriev, Oleg Vasiliev – gold medalist figure skater Svetlana Zhurova – speed skating Tamara Moskvina – figure skating coach Fedor Emelianenko – mixed martial artist Robert Swan – polar explorers Artur Chilingarov – cosmonaut Valentina Tereshkova – astronaut Alisa Freindlich – actress Andrei Arshavin – football player	80
April 6	Great Britain (London) (start); Wembley Stadium (finish); The O2 arena	48 km	Kelly Holmes – gold medalist runner Danny Crates – gold medalist Paralympic runner Sir Trevor McDonald – journalist Konnie Huq – TV Presenter; Vanessa Mae – classical musician Kevin Pietersen – cricketer Tim Henman – retired tennis player Amara Karan – actress	80
April 7	France (Paris) (start); Eiffel Tower (finish); Stade Charléty	originally 28 km	Stéphane Diagana – gold medalist runner David Douillet – gold medalist in judo Marie-José Pérec – gold medalist runner Jin Jing – Paralympic fencer Thierry Henry – Soccer star Teddy Riner – gold medalist judoka Arnaud Di Pasquale – tennis player Pi Hongyan – badminton player Mary Pierce – tennis player	
April 9	United States (San Francisco) (start); AT&T Park (finish); San Francisco International Airport	unannounced	Lin Li – swimmer	
April 11	Argentina (Buenos Aires) (start); Lola Mora amphitheater (finish); Buenos Aires Riding Club	13.8 km	Carlos Espínola – windsurfer Georgina Bardach, Paola Suárez, Pablo Chacón – athletes	78
April 13	Tanzania (Dar es Salaam) (start); A railway station of Dar es Salaam (finish); Tanzanian National Stadium	5 km	John Stephen Akhwari – marathoner Dorcus Inzikuru – steeplechaser Anna Tibaijuka – Undersecretary general of the United Nations	80
April 14	Oman (Muscat) (start) place roundabout Al Bustan (where lies the "Sohar" boat which visited China in 1981) (finish); Qurm Natural Park	20 km		80
April 16	Pakistan (Islamabad)		Samiullah Khan – field hockey Jahangir Khan – squash player	65
April 17	India (New Delhi) (start); Raisina Hill (finish); India Gate	2.3 km	Manavjit Singh Sandhu, Abhinav Bindra – sport shooter Aamir Khan – actor, director	around 70
April 19	Thailand (Bangkok) (start); Yaowarat Road in Bangkok's Chinatown (finish); Royal Plaza	10 km	Anant Siripasraporn – Deputy Permanent Secretary for Bangkok Metropolitan Administration; Manus Boonjumnong, Somluck Kamsing – gold medalist boxers Udomporn Polsak, Pawina Thongsuk – gold medalist weightlifters	80
April 21	Malaysia (Kuala Lumpur) (start); Independence Square (finish); Petronas Twin Towers	16.5 km	Cheah Soon Kit, Yap Kim Hock – retired badminton player Nicol David – squash player	80
April 22	Indonesia (Jakarta)	7 km; originally 20 km	Taufik Hidayat, Susi Susanti, Alan Budikusuma – badminton player Fauzi Bowo – governor of Jakarta	80
April 24	Australia (Canberra) (start); Reconciliation Place (finish); Commonwealth Park	16 km	Ian Thorpe, Jodie Henry, Libby Trickett, Matt Welsh, Adam Pine, Alice Mills, Petria Thomas – gold medalist swimmers Ron Clarke – runner Mark Beretta – TV sports reporter Tania Major – Aboriginal activist Megan Marcks – coxless pair rower Jonathon Welch – conductor Robert de Castella – gold medalist marathoner Lee Kernaghan – singer Fiona Stanley – epidemiologist Mark Beretta – sports broadcaster Peter Sharp – Rugby league coach Louise Sauvage – Paralympic wheelchair racer Jai Taurima – long jumper Fiona Wood – director of Royal Perth Hospital, surgeon Heather McKay – squash player	80
April 26	Japan (Nagano) (start); Small park in Nagano (finish); Wakasato Park	18.7 km	Senichi Hoshino – baseball manager Kosuke Kitajima – gold medalist swimmer Mizuki Noguchi – gold medalist runner Ai Fukuhara – table tennis player	80
April 27	South Korea (Seoul) (start); Olympic Park (finish); City Hall Plaza	22 km	Moon Dae-sung – gold medalist taekwondo Kim Mi-jung – gold medalist judoka Ahn Hyun-soo – gold medalist speed skater Nam Eun-young – gold medalist in handball Kim Soo-nyung – gold medalist archer Bada – singer and musical actress Jang Na-ra – singer and actress	70+
April 28	North Korea (Pyongyang) (start); Tower of Juche Idea (finish); Kim Il Sung Stadium	20 km	Pak Doo-ik – football player	80
April 29	Vietnam (Ho Chi Minh City) (start); Opera House (finish); Military Zone 7 Competition Hall	10 km		60

The opening relay route ceremony was held at the Hong Kong Cultural Centre. The song "We are ready" was performed by Eason Chan, Hotcha, EO2 accompanied by Hong Kong Chinese Orchestra, Hong Kong Dance company, Gauido international golden eagle gymnastics team, and senior mixed choir of the Diocesan Girls' School and the Diocesan Boys' School.

Date	City	Length	Notable torchbearers	# of torchbearers
May 2	Hong Kong (start); Hong Kong Cultural Centre (finish); Golden Bauhinia Square	26 km	Lee Lai-shan – gold medalist in windsurfing Li Ching, Ko Lai-chak – table-tennis players Andy Lau, Jacky Cheung, Alex Fong, Kelly Chen, Leo Ku – singers Rebecca Chiu Wing-yin – squash player Leung Chun-ying – member of Executive Council; Stephen Chan – general manager of TVB; Victor Li Tzar-kuoi – managing director of Cheung Kong group Thomas Kwok Ping-kwong – managing director of Sun Hung Kai group Ng Ching-fai – principal of Hong Kong Baptist University; Michael Cheng Lai-hin – footballer Koon Wai-chee, Wang Chen – badminton players Lee Ka-kit – vice chairman of Henderson Group; Chu Ching-wu – president of The Hong Kong University of Science and Technology; Liza Wang – actress, singer & chairperson of Cantonese Opera Performers Association; Yip Wing-sie – music director of Hong Kong Sinfonietta; Rita Fan – president of Legislative Council; Timothy Fok – president of SFOC; Wong Kam-po – gold medalist at Asian games in cycling	119
May 3	Macau (start and finish); Macau Fisherman's Wharf	19 km originally 27 km	Miriam Yeung – Hong Kong singer Stanley Ho – casino tycoon.	120

=== Hong Kong and Macau gallery ===
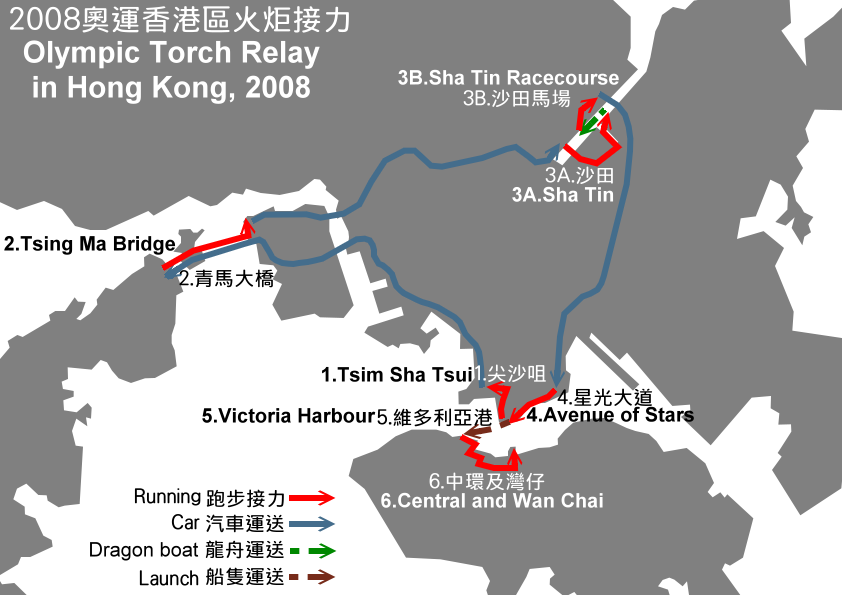
Torch relay route map

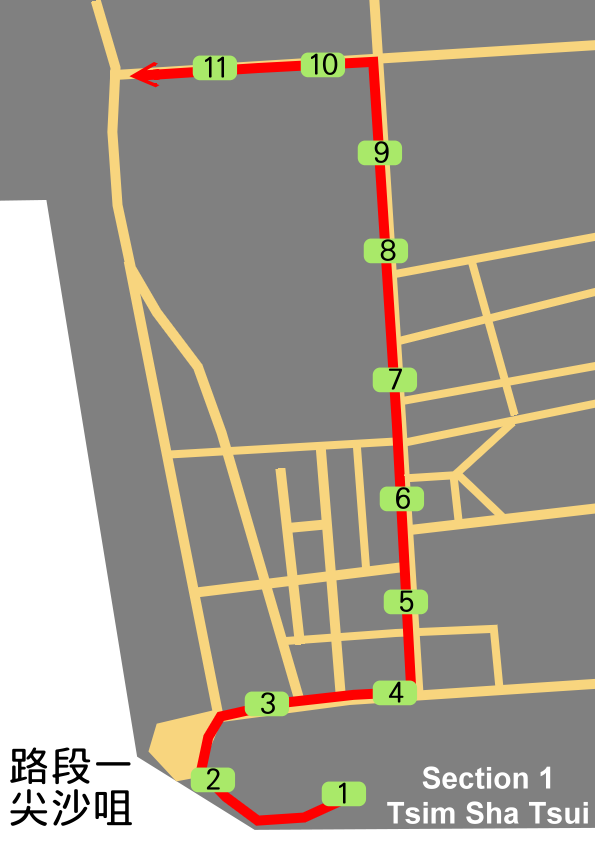
Section 1, Tsim Sha Tsui

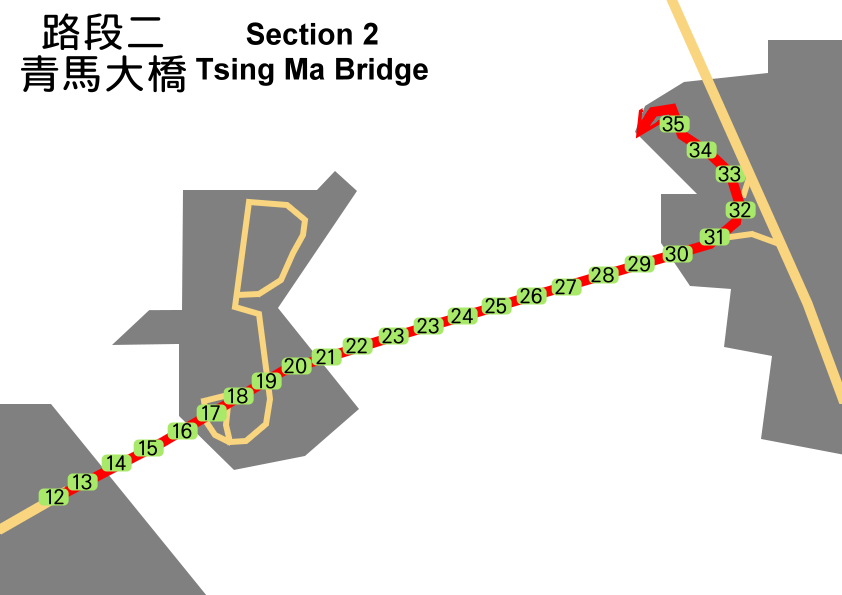
Section 2, Tsing Ma Bridge

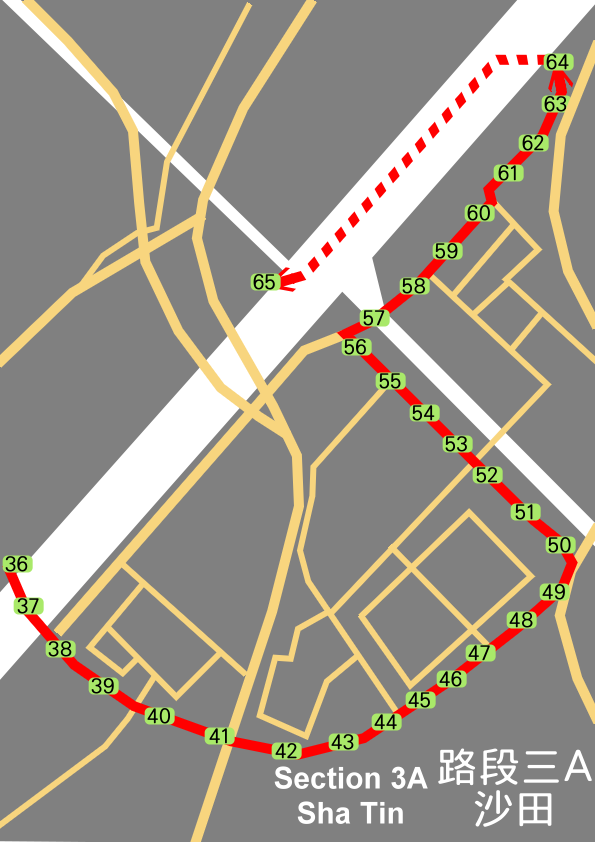
Section 3A, Sha Tin

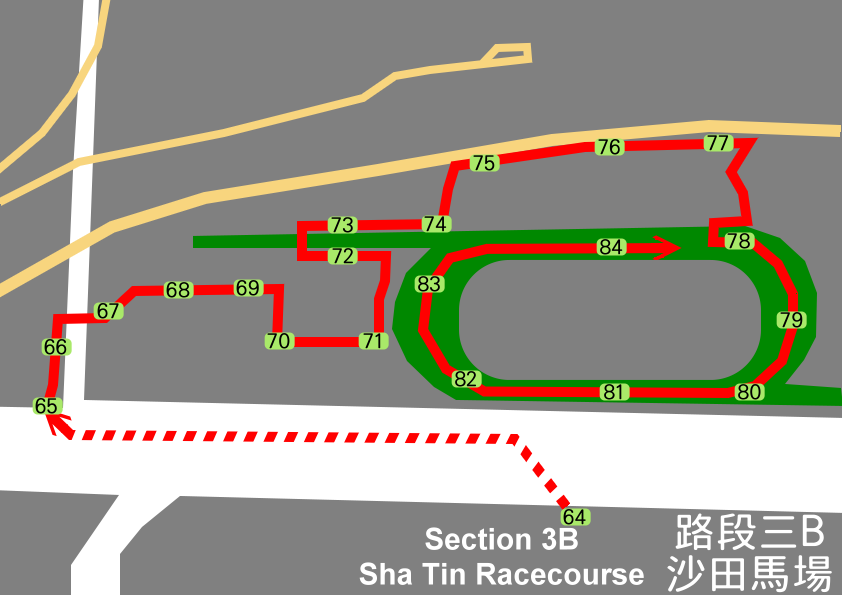
Section 3B, Sha Tin Racecourse

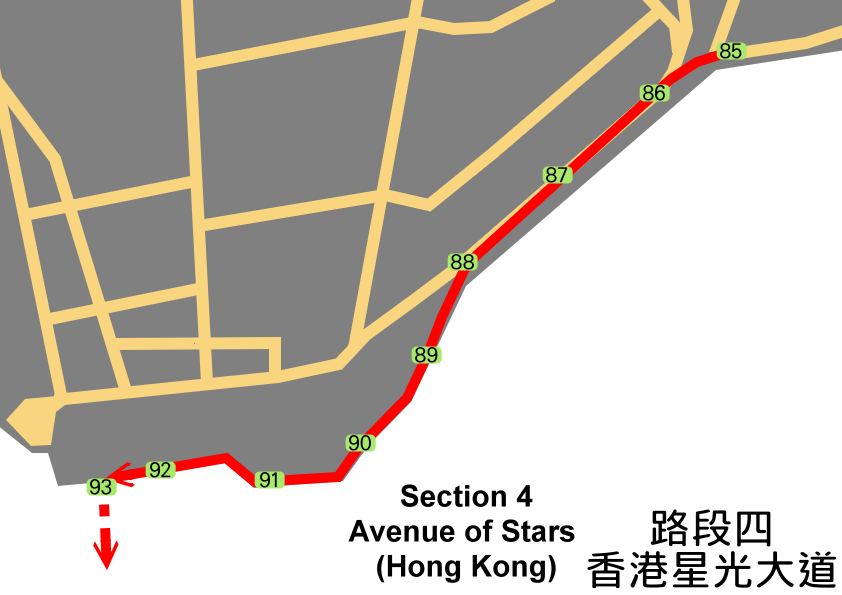
Avenue of Stars

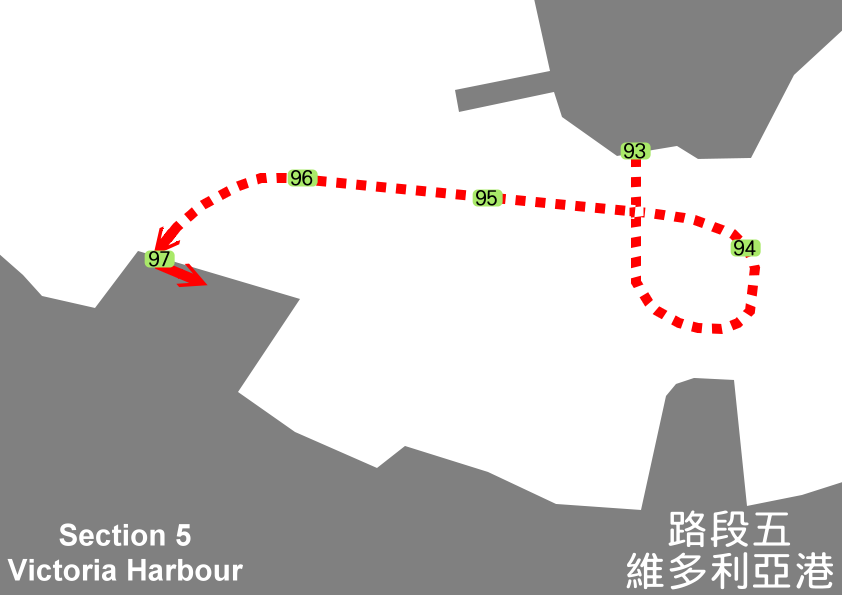
Section 5, Victoria Harbour

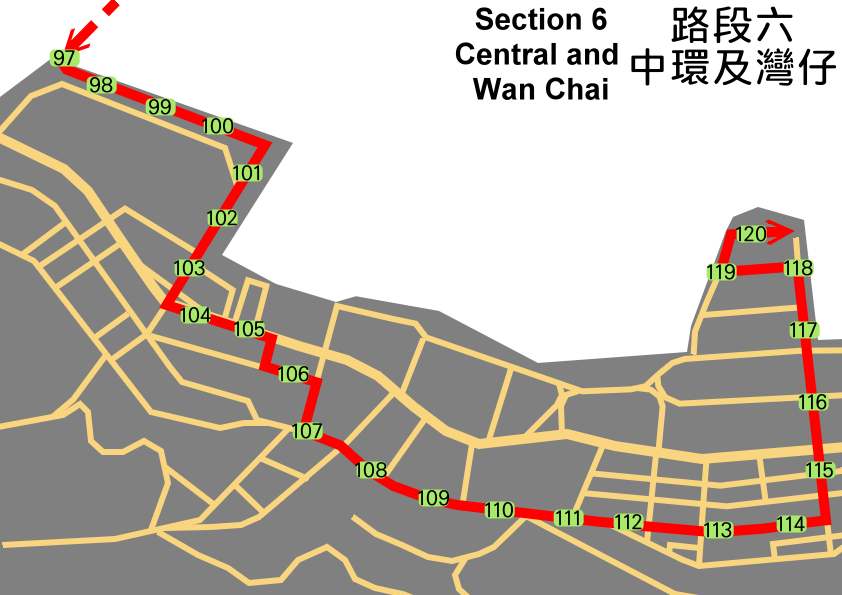
Central and Wan Chai

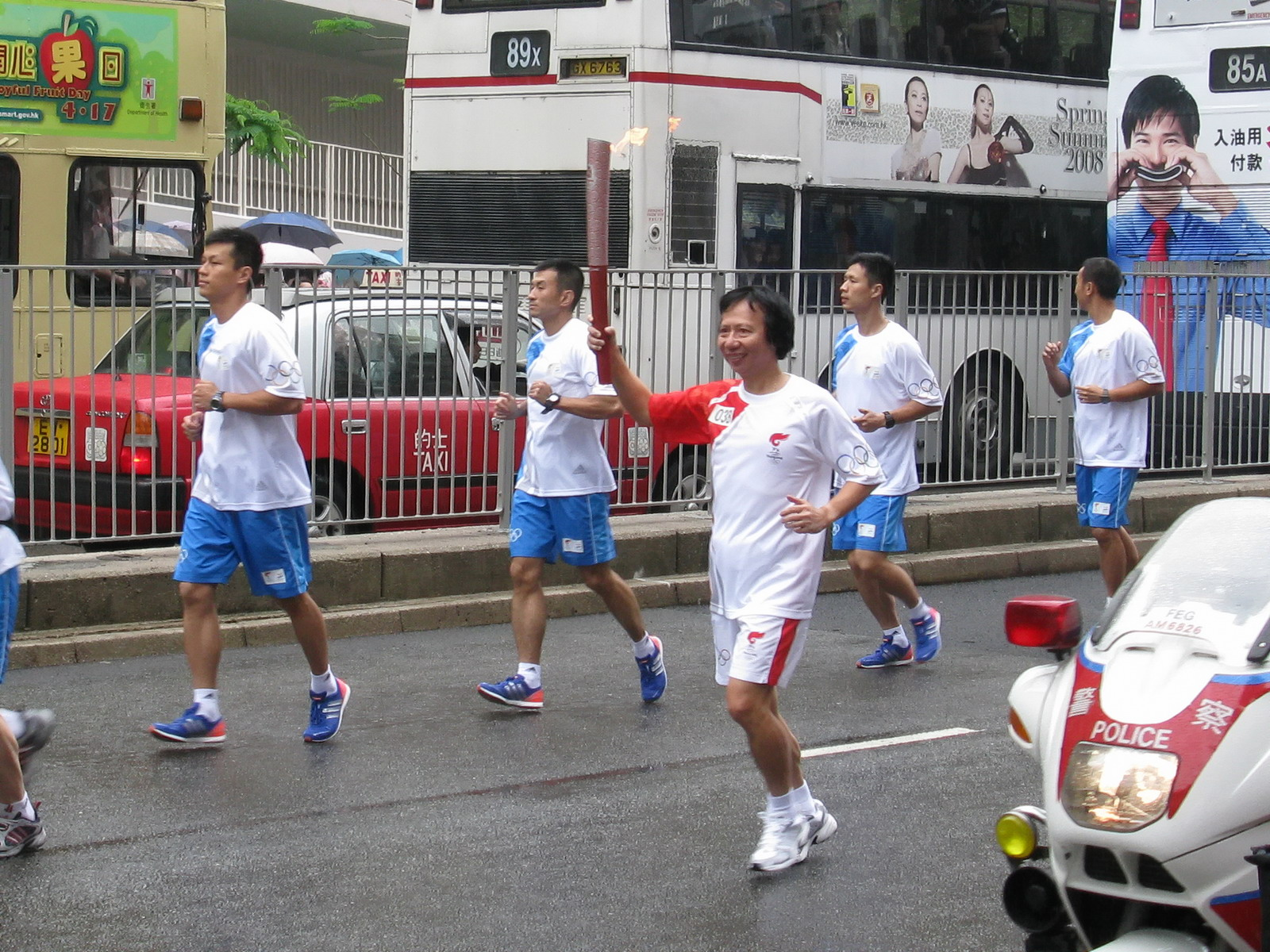
Relayer #38: Thomas Kwok (郭炳江)

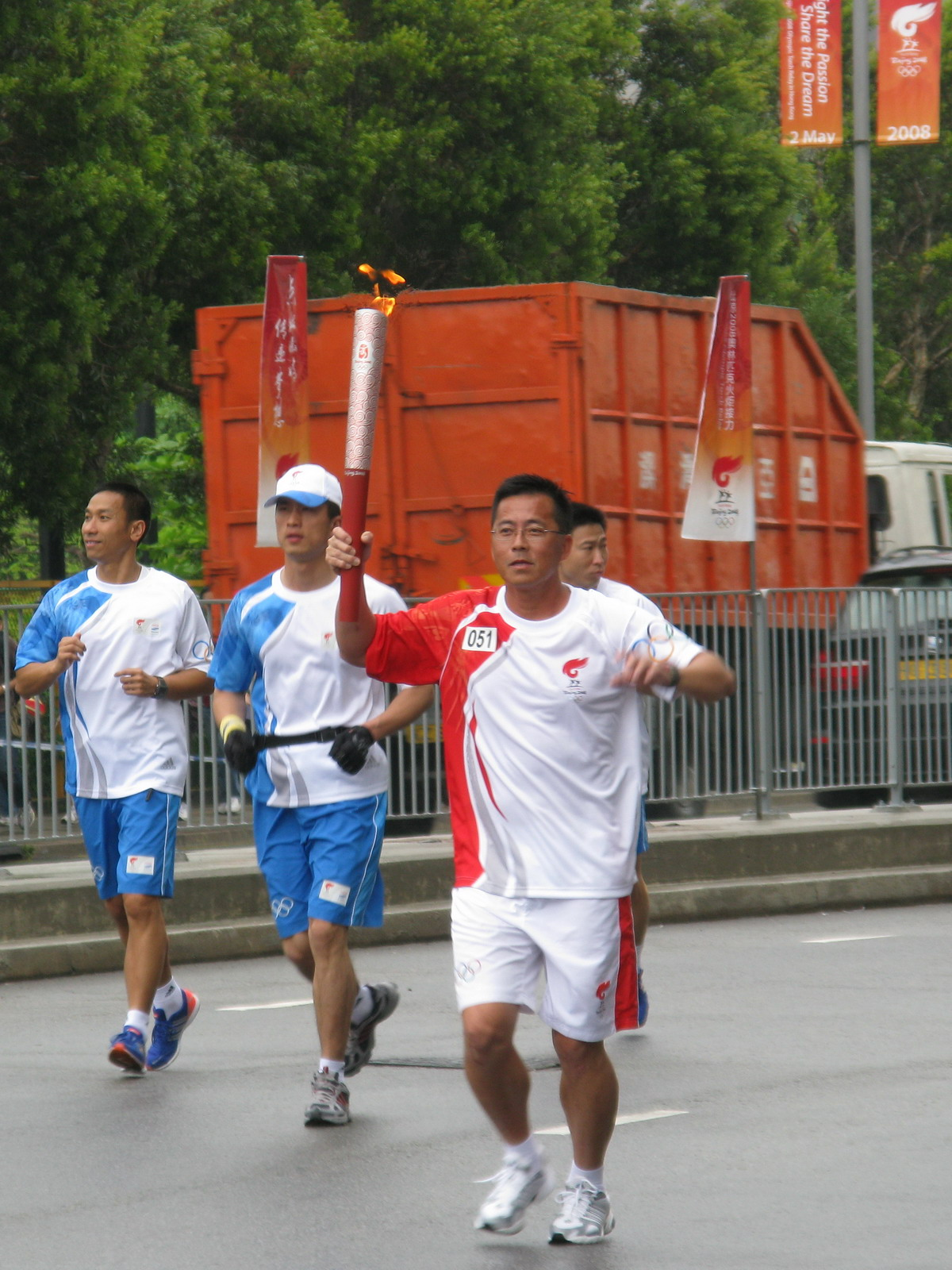
Relayer #51: Ma Koon-sang (馬觀生)

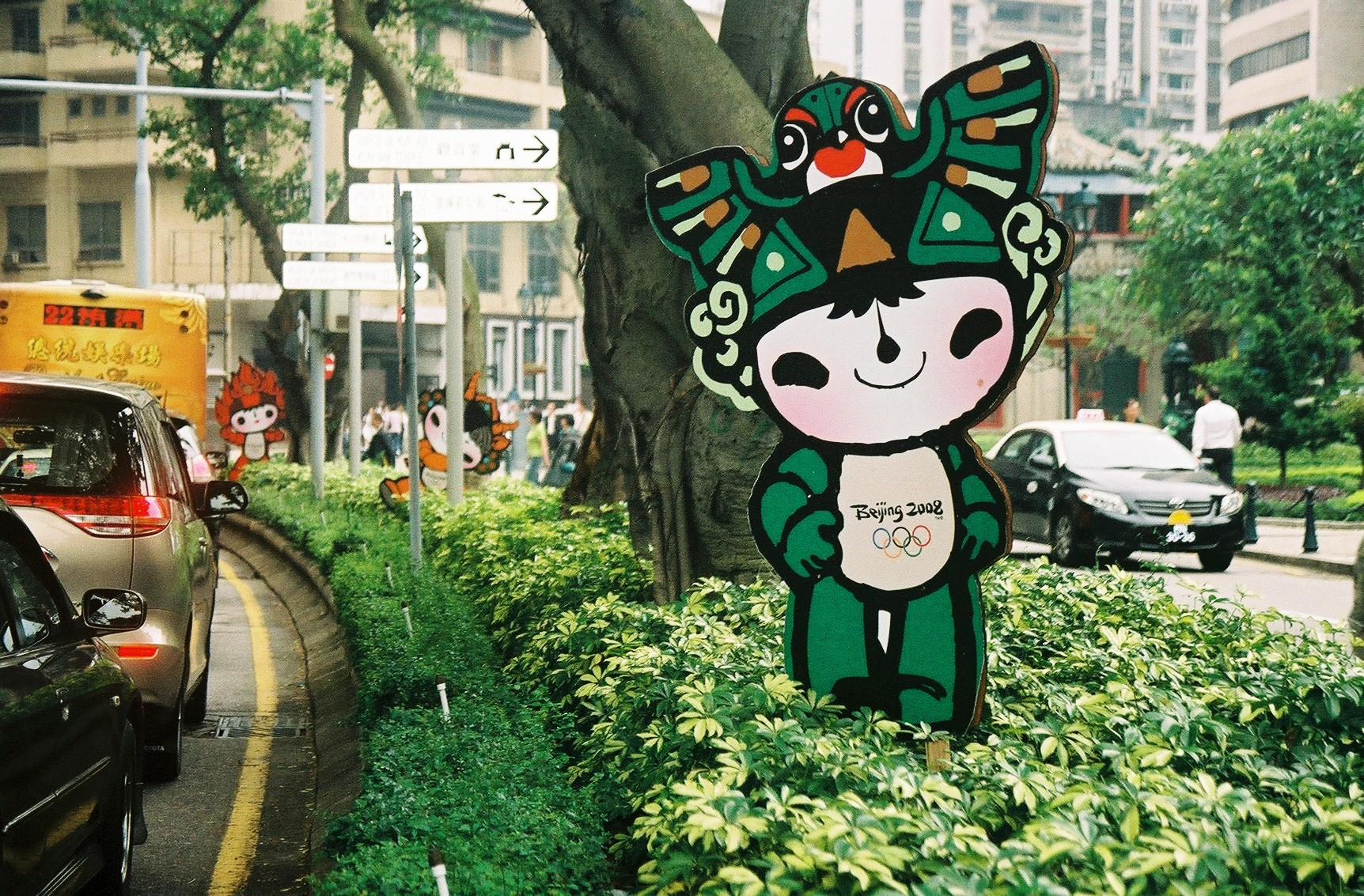
Fuwa designs along the way

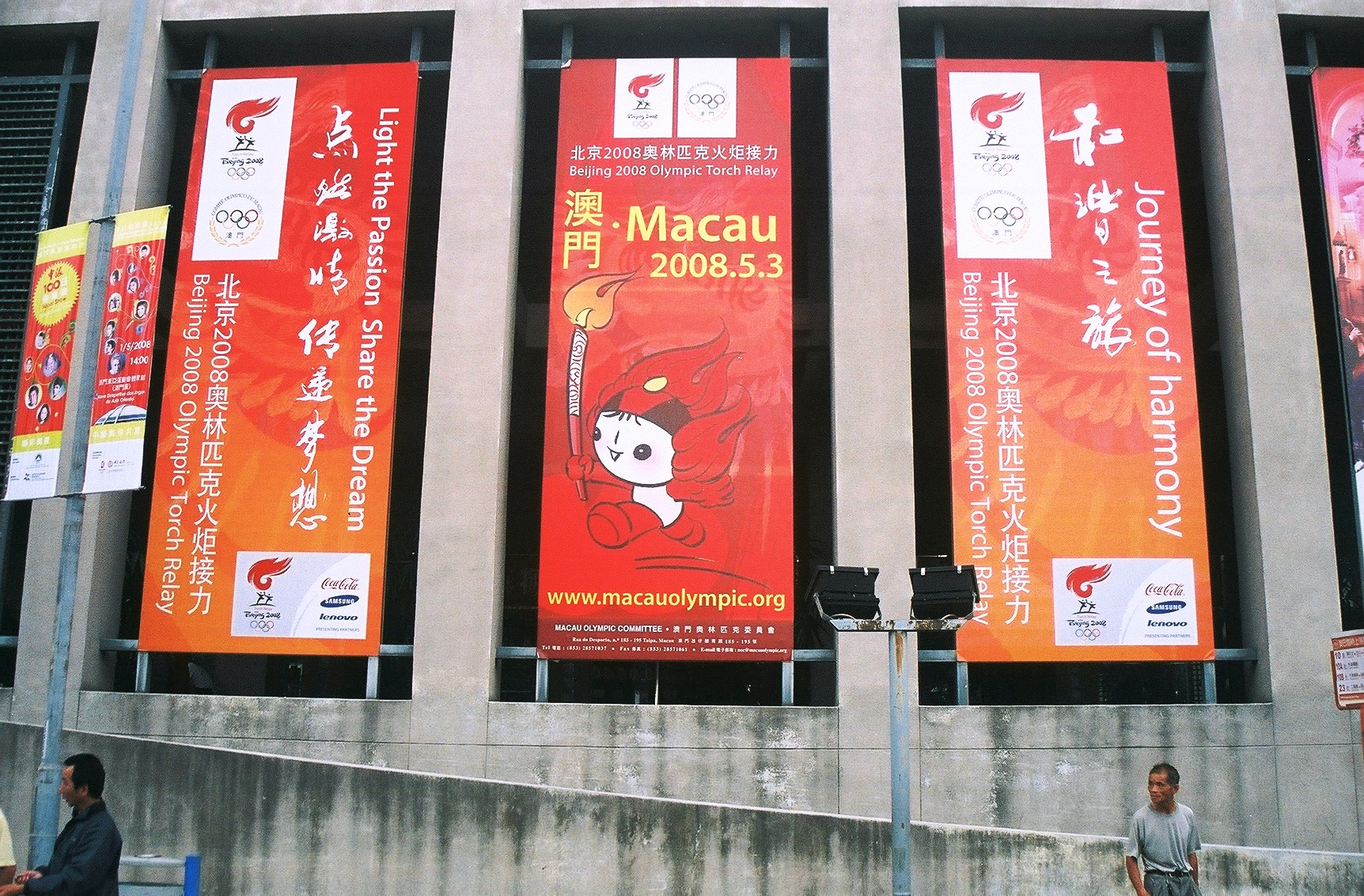
Banners along the way

== Route in mainland China ==
Mainland China torch relay route Planned torch relay route in mainland China before the earthquake.
Date	China Province / City		Length	Notable torchbearers	# of torchbearers
May 4	Hainan	Sanya	30.09	Yang Yang – gold medalist speed skater Yi Jianlian – basketball player for the Milwaukee Bucks; Yang Lan – businesswomen Zhang Zilin – Miss World 2007; Huang Xiaoming – actor Jackie Chan – actor	208
May 5	Hainan	Wuzhishan	1.2 km	Yang Yang – gold medalist speed skater Yi Jianlian – basketball player for the Milwaukee Bucks; Yang Lan – businesswomen Zhang Zilin – Miss World 2007; Huang Xiaoming – actor Jackie Chan – actor	6
May 5	Hainan	Wanning (including Qionghai)	16.63 km (+13.51)	Yang Yang – gold medalist speed skater Yi Jianlian – basketball player for the Milwaukee Bucks; Yang Lan – businesswomen Zhang Zilin – Miss World 2007; Huang Xiaoming – actor Jackie Chan – actor	113 (+89)
May 6	Hainan	Haikou	30.2 km	Yang Yang – gold medalist speed skater Yi Jianlian – basketball player for the Milwaukee Bucks; Yang Lan – businesswomen Zhang Zilin – Miss World 2007; Huang Xiaoming – actor Jackie Chan – actor	208
May 7	Guangdong	Guangzhou	40.82 km	Yang Jinghui – gold medalist diver Ulrika Knape – gold medalist Swedish diver Dong Zhaozhi – silver medalist fencer Shen Xiangfu – former Chinese national football coach	208
May 8	Guangdong	Shenzhen	40 km	Xiao Jinfeng – gold medalist gymnast Wang Shi (王石) – head of China Vanke	–
May 8	Mt Everest Summit		–	–	–
May 9	Guangdong	Huizhou	–	Liang Wenbo – snooker player	–
May 10	Guangdong	Shantou	–	Sun Shuwei – gold medalist diver Xu Yinchuan – international master of Chinese chess	208
May 11	Fujian	Fuzhou	–	Zheng Meizhu – gold medalist volleyball player Hou Yuzhu – gold medalist volleyball player Lin Qiang (林强), a sixth-generation descendant of Lin Zexu – person who opposed opium trade with the British in the Qing dynasty and led to the First Opium War	208
May 12	Fujian	Quanzhou	20.35 km	–	108
May 12	Fujian	Xiamen	17.4 km	Guo Yuehua – winner of 8 consecutive titles for table tennis Ji Xinpeng – gold medalist badminton player	100
May 13	Fujian	Longyan	30.5 km	Zhang Xiangxiang – bronze medalist weightlifter Shi Zhiyong – gold medalist weightlifter Chen Hong – badminton player	208
May 14	Jiangxi	Ruijin	15 km	–	208
May 15	Jiangxi	Jinggangshan	14.5 km	–	
May 16	Jiangxi	Nanchang	–	Peng Bo – gold medalist diver	
May 17	Zhejiang	Wenzhou	–	–	108
May 17	Zhejiang	Shaoxing	–	–	100
May 18	Zhejiang	Hangzhou	–	Li Lingwei – badminton champion	208
May 19 – 21	Zhejiang	–	–	Relay suspended to honor victims of the 2008 Sichuan earthquake	-
May 22	Zhejiang	Ningbo	–	–	-
May 22	Zhejiang	Jiaxing	8.2 km	Lü Lin – gold medalist table tennis player	90
May 23 – 24	Shanghai		62.84 km (day 1) + 136.55 km (day 2)	Zhuang Yong – gold medalist swimmer Zhou Xun – actress and singer Liu Xuegen (刘学根), father of Liu Xiang; Li Bingbing – actress Tony Leung Ka-Fai – actor Sun Wen – football (soccer) player Chen Lu – world champion figure skater Zhu Jianhua – medalist high jumper Lee Kaifu – founder of Google China; Cao Yanhua – table tennis champion	416 (including 44 foreign nationals)
May 25	Jiangsu	Suzhou	17 km	–	104
May 25	Jiangsu	Nantong	20 km	–	104
May 26	Jiangsu	Taizhou	12.8 km	–	104
May 26	Jiangsu	Yangzhou	11 km	–	104
May 27	Jiangsu	Nanjing	12.9 km	Yang Yang – badminton player Chen Peisi – actor Gao Yuanyuan – actress	208
May 28	Anhui	Hefei	–	Fan Xueping – wushu champion Jiang Xiaoyu (蒋效愚) – executive VP of the Beijing Organizing Committee for the Olympic Games	
May 29	Anhui	Huainan	–	Zhou Tao – TV presenter Zhang Yan (张燕) – singer	100
May 29	Anhui	Wuhu	–	Vicki Zhao – actress and singer	100
May 30	Anhui	Jixi	–	Ding Junhui – snooker player	80
May 30	Anhui	Huangshan	–	Ye Qiaobo – speed skating champ	120
May 31	Hubei	Wuhan	20.7 km	Li Xiaoshuang – gold medalist gymnast	
June 1	Hubei	Yichang	10 km	Li Ting – gold medalist tennis player Karen Mok – singer	208
June 2	Hubei	Jingzhou	18.6 km	Zeng Li (曾黎) – actress	208
June 3	Hunan	Yueyang	16.9 km	–	
June 4	Hunan	Changsha	–	Zhong Zhihua – head of Hunan University; Xiong Ni – 3-time gold medalist diver	208
June 5	Hunan	Shaoshan	79.1 km		208
June 6	Guangxi	Guilin	–	Xiao Jiangang – weightlifting champion Tang Lingsheng – gold medalist weightlifter	
June 7	Guangxi	Nanning	16.5 km	Chen Wenzhong – olympic sprinter Mo Huilan – gymnast	
June 8	Guangxi	Baise	–	–	
June 9	Yunnan	Kunming	8.3 km	Angela Chang – Taiwanese singer and actress	208
June 10	Yunnan	Lijiang	26 km	–	-
June 11	Yunnan	Xamgyi'nyilha	40.36 km	Zhang Guowei – track & field	–
June 12	Guizhou	Guiyang	16.9 km	–	208
June 13	Guizhou	Kaili	19.3 km	–	208
June 14	Guizhou	Zunyi	6.3 km	–	208
June 15 – 16	Chongqing	–	17 km	Gu Li – Go champion	208
June 17	Xinjiang	Ürümqi	12.5 km	Wang Yanhong – gold medalist archer Abuduxikeer Mijiti – boxing champion	208
June 18	Xinjiang	Kashi	7.43 km	–	208
June 19	Xinjiang	Shihezi	–	–	-
June 19	Xinjiang	Changji	4.4 km	–	104
June 21	Tibet	Lhasa	11 km	Cedai Drolma – singer	156
June 22	Qinghai	Golmud	7.5 km	–	-
June 23	Qinghai	Qinghai Lake	6 km	–	162
June 24	Qinghai	Xining	–	Li Chunxiu – medalist racewalker	-
June 25	Shanxi	Yuncheng	9.8 km	Lu Shuming – actor Zhang Weihong – medalist handball player	104
June 25	Shanxi	Pingyao	–	–	
June 26	Shanxi	Taiyuan	39 km	Yan Weiwen – singer Tan Jing – singer Robin Li – CEO of Baidu	208
June 27	Shanxi	Datong	4 km	–	208
June 28	Jiuquan Satellite Launch Center		22	Fei Junlong, Nie Haisheng – crew of Shenzhou spacecraft 6	–
June 29	Ningxia	Zhongwei	3.3 km	–	-
June 30	Ningxia	Wuzhong	5.6 km	–	193
July 1	Ningxia	Yinchuan	–	–	-
July 2	Shaanxi	Yan'an	6.31 km	–	208
July 3	Shaanxi	Yangling	6.53 km	–	95
July 3	Shaanxi	Xianyang	6.9 km	–	113
July 4	Shaanxi	Xi'an	–	Tian Liang – gold medalist diver	200
July 5	Gansu	Dunhuang	7.6 km	Fan Jinshi – director of Dunhuang Research Institute	120
July 6	Gansu	Jiayuguan	13.8 km	–	208
July 7	Gansu	Lanzhou	–	–	-
July 8	Inner Mongolia	Hohhot	6.2 km	Mengke Bateer – pro basketball player Pan Gang – president of Yili group	208
July 9	Inner Mongolia	Ordos	6.3 km	–	104
July 9	Inner Mongolia	Baotou	–	–	104
July 10	Inner Mongolia	Chifeng	6.2 km	Siqingaowa – actress	208
July 11	Heilongjiang	Harbin	14.86 km	Zhang Dan & Zhang Hao – pairs figure skating Shen Xue & Zhao Hongbo – pairs figure skating Sun Xue – singer	208
July 12	Heilongjiang	Daqing	7.6 km	–	208
July 13	Heilongjiang	Qiqihar	7.5 km	–	208
July 14	Jilin	Changchun	9 km	Wang Chunlu – silver medalist short track skater	218
July 15	Jilin	Songyuan	–	–	110
July 15	Jilin	Jilin City	7.7 km	Wang Chunli – medalist skater	108
July 16	Jilin	Yanji	–	Xie Jun – chess champion	-
July 17	Liaoning	Shenyang	10.08 km	Zhuang Xiaoyan – gold medalist in judo Han Xiaopeng – gold medalist freestyle skier Li Yuwei – gold medalist shooter Gao Hongmiao – racewalking champion	241
July 18	Liaoning	Anshan	7.3 km	Wang Yifu – gold medalist shooter	175
July 19	Liaoning	Dalian	–		
July 21	Shandong	Qingdao	14.5 km	Zhang Xiaodong – medalist windsurfer	259
July 21	Shandong	Linyi	5.6 km	–	109
July 22	Shandong	Qufu	5.1 km	–	100
July 22	Shandong	Tai'an	–	Bi Wenjing – uneven bars athlete Xing Aowei – gymnast	120
July 23	Shandong	Jinan	13.5 km	Xing Huina – gold medalist track & field Lin Weining – weightlifter Wu Minxia – gold medalist diver Qiao Yunping – table tennis champion Guo Jingjing – gold medalist diver	243
July 25	Henan	Zhengzhou	7.6 km		208
July 26	Henan	Kaifeng	6.6 km	Chang Wu (張武) – a designer of Dancing Beijing symbol Wang Liqun – historian and professor of Henan University; Mark Roswell – xiangsheng actor Zheng Haixia – medalist basketball player	208
July 27	Henan	Luoyang	6.9 km	–	208
July 28	Henan	Anyang	5.9 km	–	208
July 29	Hebei	Shijiazhuang	9.3 km	Cai Yalin – medalist shooting champion Li Meisu – medalist in shot put	188
July 30	Hebei	Qinhuangdao	7 km	Xi Enting – table tennis champion	256
July 31	Hebei	Tangshan	10.1 km	Qian Hong – gold medalist swimmer	208
August 1 – 2	Tianjin		12 km	–	225
August 3	Sichuan	Guang'an	7.3 km	Jiang Min – policewoman	189
August 4	Sichuan	Leshan	8.2 km	Gao Min – gold medalist diver	185
August 5	Sichuan	Chengdu	13.2 km	Zhang Shan – gold medalist shooter	315
August 6	Beijing (outside)		16.4 km	Zhang Yimou – film director Bai Yansong – CCTV anchor Yang Liwei – astronaut Liu Qi – president of the Beijing Organizing Committee for the Olympic Games; Li Furong – VP of BOCOG; Yao Ming – basketball player Song Dandan – actress Liu Chuanzhi – founder of Lenovo; Wu Shaozu – former chairperson of Chinese Olympic Committee; Lang Lang – pianist Wang Hui – intellectual Yang Yuanqing – Lenovo chairman Jiang Xiaoyu – executive VP of BOCOG; JJ Lin – singer Yu Dan – professor Wu Jinglian – economist Li Yongbo – medalist badminton player Dong Jiong – medalist badminton player Winfried Vahland – president of Volkswagen China; Song Taishan – Coca-Cola Beijing general manager Luo Jing – Newsreporter	433
August 7	Beijing (outside)		14.58 km	Liu Xuan – medalist gymnast Song Zuying – singer Yang Wenjun – gold medalist flatwater canoer Hu Kai – gold medalist sprinter Han Geng - Member of South Korean Boy Band Super Junior	268
August 8	Beijing (outside)		–	Feng Gong – xiangsheng performer Xu Zhihong – president of Peking University	-
August 8	Beijing (part of opening ceremony in Beijing National Stadium)		–	Xu Haifeng – gold medalist shooter Gao Min – gold medalist diver Li Xiaoshuang – gold medalist gymnast Zhan Xugang – gold medalist weightlifter Zhang Jun – gold medalist badminton Chen Zhong – gold medalist taekwondo Sun Jinfang – member of team that won China's first major championship in a team sport Li Ning – gold medalist gymnast	-

The total torchbearer counts for each city are available at the official website of the torch relay. The relay was suspended from May 19 – 21 to honor victims of the 2008 Sichuan earthquake.

== See also ==
- 2008 Summer Olympics torch relay
