= A-One (band) =

Chinese musical group

- Occupation: Singer
- Years active: 2008–present

Chinese name
Transcriptions
Standard Mandarin
- Hanyu Pinyin: A-One zu3 he2
Yue: Cantonese
- Jyutping: A-One zou2 hap6
- Musical career
- Origin: China
- Genre: Mandopop
- Label: Kiss-star
- Members: 3+x
- Website: kiss-star.com/aonezuhe.html

A-One is a mandopop group created in 2008 under the label Hong Kong Kiss-star entertainment Beijing company (香港Kiss Star娱乐北京有限公司).

== Names ==
A number of names have been used for this group.

- A-One (昆虫一族)
- A-One (昆虫组合)
- A-One (中国昆虫)

== Career ==
Originally Gillian Chung was scheduled to be a performer at the 2008 Summer Olympics opening ceremony. But due to the Edison Chen photo scandal, director Zhang Yimou had replaced Twins with A-One. A-One did not make their international debut on 8 August as part of the ceremony.

After 2 years of training the group debuted after Hunan Satellite TV show Happy camp (快乐大本营).

== Members ==
The group members are counted as 3+x where the most popular 3 members are in the group. Sometimes it may have 5 or more members. There had been 10 members in total. The official website describe this fan selection style as democratic (民主) for the 21st century.

== Album ==
- Jeet Kune Do (截拳道)
