= Fou (instrument) =

Ancient Chinese percussion instrument

The fou (缶 or 缻; pinyin: fǒu) is an ancient Chinese percussion instrument consisting of a pottery or bronzeware crock, jar, pot, or similar vessel, which was struck with a stick. Its origin dates back to the Xia or Shang dynasties, where it was used in ritual music. It later became a standard instrument in Confucian ritual ensembles.

It was first confirmed in 2004 that the fou is an instrument, with the discovery of nearly 500 musical instruments in the Tombs for Nobles of the Yue State, Wuxi City, Jiangsu Province. Also found there were nine other varieties of instruments, including the yongzhong (a type of bell) and qing (chime stone) from the Central Plain, chunyu (a metal percussion instrument), dingning (a bell with a handle), duo (big bell) and ling (little bell).

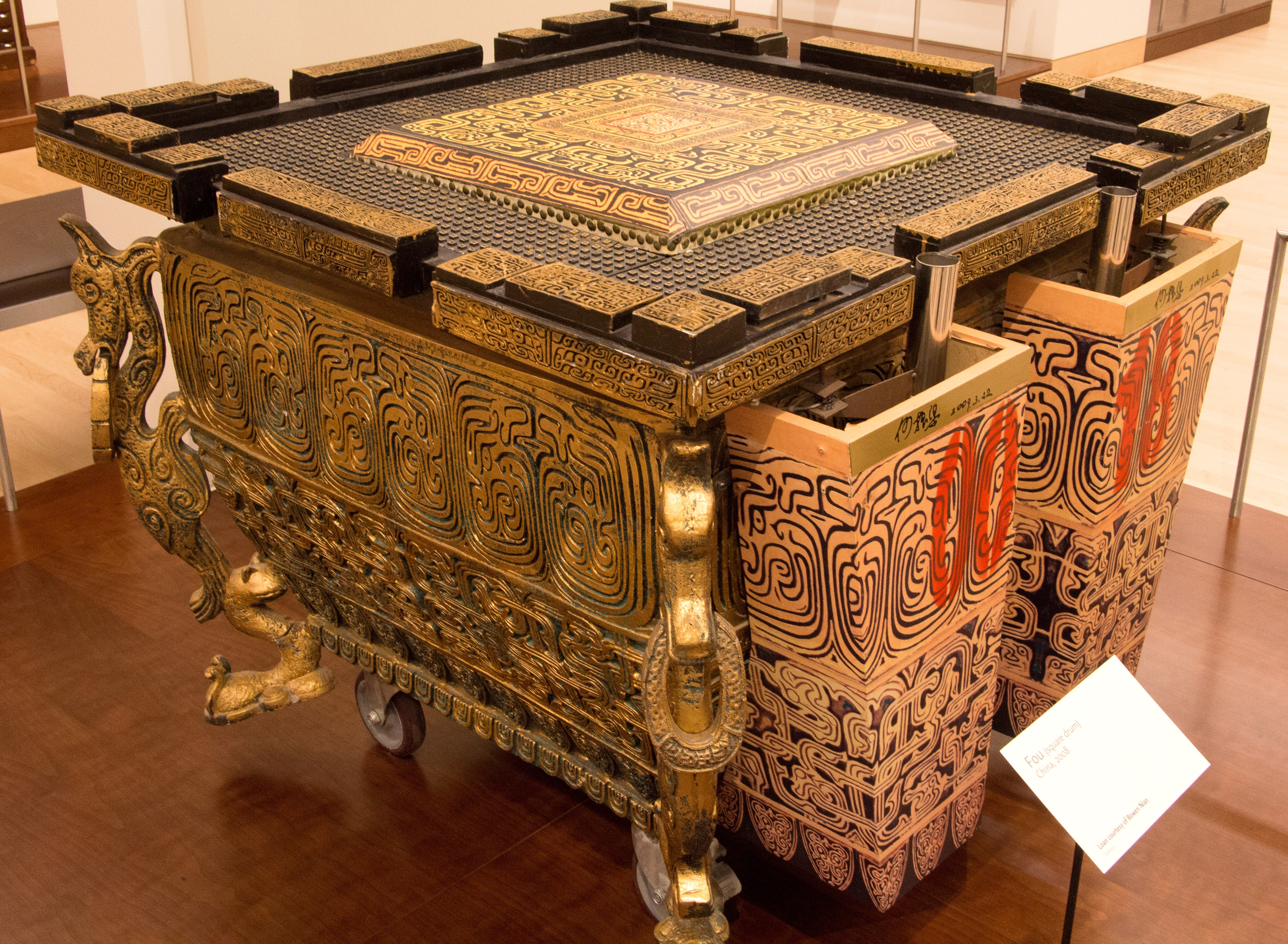
Fou used on 2008 Summer Olympics Opening Ceremony, exhibited at Musical Instrument Museum (Phoenix)

It made its modern appearance during the 2008 Summer Olympics Opening Ceremony in Beijing. Towards the beginning of the ceremony, 2,008 dancer/percussionists staged a synchronized presentation, striking large square fou with glowing red sticks.^{photo} Those instruments had a white square LED array surrounding each drum, allowing them all to produce both music and a dazzling display, which included Chinese characters and shapes created in tandem.

The Chinese character fou (缶 or 缻) is used to refer to containers. The character has fallen into disuse in Chinese; however, it is still used to refer to cans in Japanese. Since the Xia and Shang dynasties, some types of those containers were used as musical instruments known as "percussion fou" (击缶). Since its publicity, there has been some scholarly disputes on whether the fou used during the Olympics were actually musical instruments, as they could simply have been containers.

In the Confucian ritual music of Korea, a musical instrument made from a clay pot, called the bu (hangul: 부; hanja: 缶), which is derived from the fou, is used.
