= Lin Miaoke =

Chinese actress and singer (born 1999)

- 林妙可
- Born: 1 July 1999 (age 27); Beijing, China
- Education: Nanjing University of the Arts
- Occupations: Actress, singer
- Years active: 2005–present

Chinese name
- Traditional Chinese: 林妙可
- Simplified Chinese: 林妙可
Transcriptions
Standard Mandarin
- Hanyu Pinyin: Lín Miàokě
- Wade–Giles: Lin^{2}Miao^{4}K'o^{3}
Yue: Cantonese
- Jyutping: Lam^{4} Miu^{6}ho^{2}
Southern Min
- Hokkien POJ: Lîm Biāu-khó

Lin Miaoke (Chinese: 林妙可; pinyin: Lín Miàokě, born 1 July 1999) is a Chinese actress and singer. She began appearing in advertisements as a young child and became widely known in 2008, when, at the age of nine, she appeared at the 2008 Summer Olympics opening ceremony in Beijing and performed "Ode to the Motherland" as the national flag was carried into the stadium. The ceremony's music director later said that the vocals had been recorded by another child, Yang Peiyi, and the organisers said the arrangement had been chosen for theatrical effect.

After the Olympics, Lin played child roles in television series including Spring Grass, The Dream of Red Mansions and Beauty's Rival in Palace. Her later work includes the films The Warriors (2016) and Millet Field (2021), and she was the lead vocalist on a charity song for the 2022 Winter Olympics.

== Early life and education ==
Lin was born on 1 July 1999 in Beijing. Her family's ancestral home is in Fuzhou, Fujian. Her father is a newspaper photojournalist, and her mother, a former laboratory technician, stopped working after Lin was born. Her parents noticed her interest in performing when she was about two years old, and she later took lessons in piano, flute and dance. She attended a primary school in Dongcheng District, Beijing.

Lin later attended the secondary school affiliated with the China Conservatory of Music, where she performed in a school production of the musical Les Misérables in 2014. In 2017, she stepped back from entertainment work to study acting at Nanjing University of the Arts. The university named her a Merit Student for the 2017–2018 academic year. She graduated in 2021.

== Career ==
=== Early work ===
Lin began appearing in advertisements at the age of five and registered with a talent agency as a child performer. In 2007, she appeared in a television advertisement with the hurdler Liu Xiang. She made her television drama debut at the age of eight. She also appeared in a music video for an Olympic song by the singer Tan Jing, which brought her to the attention of Zhang Yimou, the director of the Olympic opening ceremony.

=== 2008 Summer Olympics ===
In April 2008, Lin was called to audition for the opening ceremony of the 2008 Summer Olympics, and she was shortlisted in June. During rehearsals at the Beijing National Stadium, she and Yang Peiyi were called on alternate days.

On 8 August 2008, Lin appeared at the opening ceremony in a red dress and performed "Ode to the Motherland" as the national flag was carried into the stadium. Four days later, the ceremony's chief music director, Chen Qigang, said in a radio interview that the vocals heard in the stadium had been recorded by the seven-year-old Yang. He said the change had been made at the last minute, after a senior member of the Politburo who watched a dress rehearsal asked for Lin's voice to be replaced. Chen said that Yang had the best voice among the candidates and that Lin had given the best on-stage performance.

Lin's father said he had learned only 15 minutes before the ceremony that his daughter would appear to sing. He said both girls had played important roles but that the organisers should have made clear who was singing. Her mother later said that the family had known little about the arrangements and that Lin had simply performed as she was asked. Officials of the Beijing Organising Committee defended the decision as a choice made for theatrical effect. Gilbert Felli of the International Olympic Committee compared it to a coach choosing between players, while adding that the public should be given accurate information. Time later listed the episode among the top scandals of 2008.

After the disclosure, Lin became the target of criticism in Chinese media and online, and her parents tried to shield her from the coverage. Her mother said in 2016 that Lin had been bullied by classmates in the fourth grade. In 2018, Zhang Yimou said that Lin's own recording had been slightly off pitch, that the technical team had insisted on replacing it, and that he regretted not insisting on using her voice. In October 2020, Lin addressed the episode publicly for the first time, thanking Zhang for his remarks and saying that not everyone would understand her and that time could change people's views.

=== Television and film ===
After the Olympics, Lin played the eldest daughter of Tao Hong's title character in Zheng Xiaolong's series Spring Grass, which began airing on Beijing Television in December 2008. In late 2008, she filmed Wang Wenjie's 35-episode series An Extraordinary Beauty in the North, in which she played the younger version of the lead character, Ji Ping. In 2009, she was cast as the young Lin Daiyu in the television adaptation The Dream of Red Mansions. In the 2010 series Beauty's Rival in Palace, she played the protagonist Du Yunxi as a child, and the screenwriter Yu Zheng praised her acting.

In 2010, Lin was part of the voice cast of the animated film Black Cat Detective. In late 2011, she joined the cast of Hu Mei's historical series about Cao Cao, playing the young Emperor Ling of Han in a cross-gender role. The series, titled Cao Cao, began airing in China in 2015. In 2012, she appeared with Liu Xiaoqing in the film 37. Also in 2012, she appeared in the documentary series Lin Miaoke Looks at America, which followed her as a member of a youth exploration group on a 14-day tour of seven cities in the United States. Guided by Chen Wei, the host of a Beijing radio programme about studying abroad, the group visited organisations in finance, media and technology, including a congressional office and a Hollywood film set. In 2013, she starred with Chen Long and Liu Xiaoqing in the series Fairy Lake, which aired on CCTV-1 and CCTV-8. By that year, she had appeared in eight television series, four films and more than 20 advertisements and music videos.

In May 2016, Lin filmed The Warriors in Garzê, playing a young beggar. The film, about the Red Army's capture of the Luding Bridge, was released on 14 October 2016. In 2021, she played a rural poverty-alleviation official in Millet Field, a film about poverty relief in Xing County, Shanxi, which premiered in Taiyuan on 31 March and was released on 9 April. In March 2025, she joined the cast of the film Yongheng de Guanghua, which began shooting in Xiangning County, Shanxi.

=== Music and charity work ===
In May 2009, Lin was among 60 children, including Yang Peiyi, who recorded a children's version of the patriotic song "Country" for the 60th anniversary of the founding of the People's Republic of China. In 2010, she sang "Aha, Black Cat Detective", the theme song of the film Black Cat Detective. She performed the children's song "Love Me, Hug Me" with three other child singers at the 2011 CCTV New Year's Gala. In May 2013, she recorded the song "Virtue in My Heart".

In April 2020, Lin and Jiang Xiaomeng, the head of the music theatre department at Nanjing University of the Arts, released "Youthful China", a song marking the anniversary of the May Fourth Movement, with lyrics by Xu Honglei and music by Jiang Haocheng. The two singers recorded their parts separately in Nanjing and Beijing. Lin was the lead vocalist on "Winter Olympic Dream", a charity song released on 4 February 2022 after the opening ceremony of the 2022 Winter Olympics in Beijing. The song was composed by Dai Anshuai and also featured students from universities in China and abroad, who recorded their parts remotely.

== Filmography ==
=== Television series ===
Year	English title	Chinese title	Role	Ref.
2008	Spring Grass	春草	Chuncao's eldest daughter	
2010	An Extraordinary Beauty in the North	北方有佳人	Ji Ping (young)	
2010	Beauty's Rival in Palace	美人心计	Du Yunxi (young)	
2010	The Dream of Red Mansions	红楼梦	Lin Daiyu (young)	
2012	Lin Miaoke Looks at America	林妙可看美国	Herself (documentary)	
2013	Fairy Lake	仙女湖	Reincarnated fairy	
2015	Cao Cao	曹操	Emperor Ling of Han (young)	

=== Films ===
Year	English title	Chinese title	Role	Ref.
2010	Black Cat Detective	黑猫警长	Voice role, theme song	
2012	37	37	—	
2016	The Warriors	勇士	Young beggar	
2021	Millet Field	谷子地	Poverty-alleviation official	

== Discography ==
Year	English title	Chinese title	Notes	Ref.
2009	"Country" (children's version)	国家（童谣版）	With 59 other child singers	
2010	"Aha, Black Cat Detective"	啊哈，黑猫警长	Theme song of Black Cat Detective	
2011	"Love Me, Hug Me"	爱我你就抱抱我	Performed at the CCTV New Year's Gala	
2013	"Virtue in My Heart"	美德在我心中		
2020	"Youthful China"	青春中国	With Jiang Xiaomeng	
2022	"Winter Olympic Dream"	冰雪同梦	Charity song for the 2022 Winter Olympics	
