= Yang Peiyi =

Chinese former child singer (born 2001)

- 杨沛宜
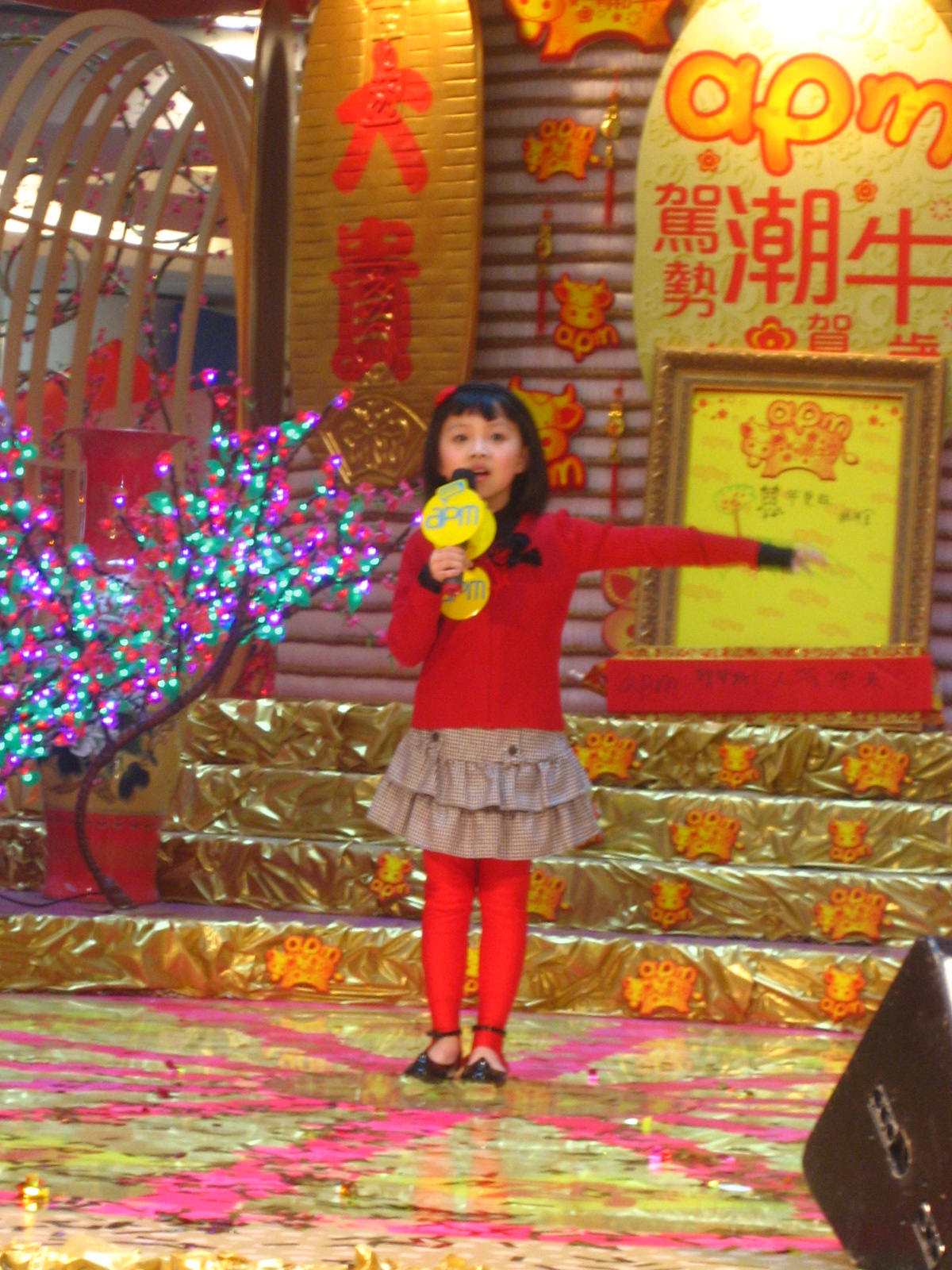
- Yang performing at a shopping mall in Hong Kong, 2009
- Born: 21 February 2001 (age 25); Beijing, China
- Other name: Camelia Yang
- Education: University of North Carolina at Chapel Hill (BS)

Chinese name
- Traditional Chinese: 楊沛宜
- Simplified Chinese: 杨沛宜
Transcriptions
Standard Mandarin
- Hanyu Pinyin: Yáng Pèiyí

Yang Peiyi (born 21 February 2001) is a Chinese former singer. Her pre-recorded vocals for the song "Ode to the Motherland" was featured during the opening ceremony of the 2008 Beijing Olympics, although Lin Miaoke appeared on stage instead. Yang graduated from the University of North Carolina at Chapel Hill in May 2025, receiving a Bachelor of Science degree with a major in economics.

== Biography ==
Yang attended the Primary School Affiliated to Peking University. On 8 August 2008, at the opening ceremony of the 2008 Beijing Olympics, 9-year-old Lin Miaoke appeared on stage performing "Ode to the Motherland", lip-syncing to a pre-recorded vocal by 7-year-old Yang, at the last minute in place of Yang who was deemed not pretty enough by the government. The vast majority who watched the broadcast were unaware of Yang's role until music director, Chen Qigang, revealed several days later that Lin was sent on stage in place of Yang.

Yang's first album was released in September 2009. In October 2009, Yang performed a medley of two songs (Note: One of which was tailor-made for the poem Looking up at the Starry Sky written by the PRC Premier Wen Jiabao) at the Hong Kong Cultural Show in Celebration of the 60th Anniversary of the Founding of the People's Republic of China (Note: 香港同胞慶祝中華人民共和國成立六十週年文藝晚會) together with Jacky Cheung, Yao Jue, and Leon Ko.

Yang graduated from the University of North Carolina at Chapel Hill and received a Bachelor of Science degree with a major in economics in May 2025.
