= 2008 Summer Olympics cauldron =

Held the Olympic flame in Beijing

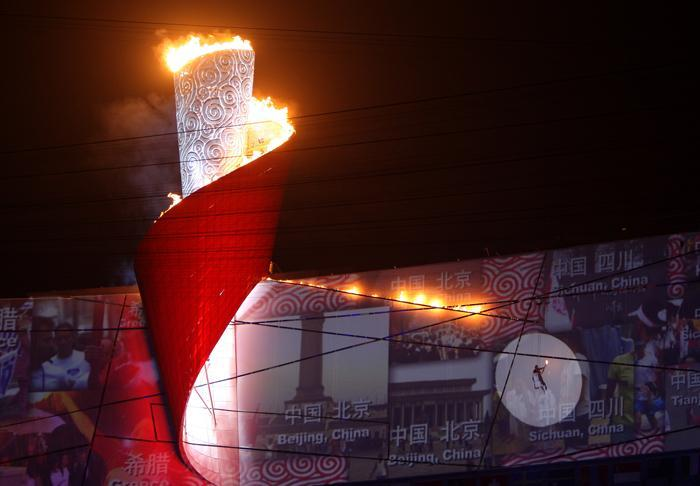
- The lighting of the 2008 Olympic cauldron
- Interactive map of 2008 Summer Olympics cauldron
- Location: Olympic Green, Beijing, China
- Coordinates: 39°59′39″N 116°23′29″E
- Designer: Lenovo
- Type: Cauldron
- Material: Steel
- Height: 35 metres (115 ft)
- Weight: 45 tonnes (44 long tons; 50 short tons)
- Opening date: 8 August 2008

The 2008 Summer Olympics cauldron (Chinese: 2008年夏季奥运会火炬塔; pinyin: 2008 nián xiàjì àoyùnhuì huǒjù tǎ) is the Olympic flame holder that was used during the 2008 Summer Olympics and the 2008 Summer Paralympics in Beijing, China. It was first lit on 8 August 2008, as part of the opening ceremony of the Games of the XXIX Olympiad and last extinguished as part of the closing ceremony of the games of the Paralympics on September 17. Originally located on the inside roof of the Beijing National Stadium, it was relocated to outside the stadium on the Olympic Green following the completion of the Games.

== Design and production ==
The Cauldron was designed by Chinese technology company Lenovo, who also designed the Olympic torch. It, along with the rim of the stadium's roof were designed to look like an unrolling scroll, with the cauldron itself representing the end of the scroll, spiralling up above the stadium. Decorated with cloud imprinting and an outer red lining, which according to Lenovo, was part of a motif meant to represent 'clouds of promise'. The design team based the cauldron's structure on the 'ancient Chinese concept' of "round heaven and square earth" (which was the design theme of the entire Beijing Olympics), drawing inspiration from the Historic Temple of Heaven Complex in Central Beijing. Its design was also inspired by the shape of a traditional Chinese Bronze Age cauldron, with the 56 individual cloud swirls on its exterior engraving representing the 56 ethnic groups of China.

The Cauldron was built by Shougang Group, a state-owned steel company and constructed over seven months in the lead up to the Beijing Olympics. Additional work on the project was completed by Beijing Gas Group and the Centre for Engineering Design and Researching (Part of the General Armaments Department of the People's Liberation Army). Its construction was led by Shougang Group project manager Li Tingxiang.

The cauldron was made from over 2000 unique handcrafted pipes and sheets of steel. It stands over 35 meters, 10-stories, tall and weighs in excess of 45 tons. The exterior of the cauldron was coated in 1,026 individual perforated steel plates, designed to increase wind resistance in its exposed position protruding out the top of the stadium.

According to Wang Wenli, Party Secretary of Shougang Group, the cauldron cost 10 million yuan (US$1.45 million) to construct.

== Installation ==
The logistics of installing the Cauldron required extensive preparation. Upon its completion, the cauldron was lifted onto the roof at the north-east end of the Bird's Nest, requiring an 800-ton load crane, two months before the Opening Ceremonies. Extensive secrecy surrounded its relocation, with the aim of keeping its design secret to the public and press until the opening ceremony. To protect it from wind and rain, and to conceal its appearance, a reverse U-shape air-cushioned facility was erected over the top of the cauldron, which was laid on its side flat along the stadium's roof. An automatic hydraulic system was installed on the roof with the purpose of moving and slotting the cauldron into its final intended position on the inside rim of the stadium's roof during the final segments of the opening ceremony. The mechanics consisted of a flat cart to hold the cauldron and a rail track to transport it to the edge of the roof. When in position, it was moved into an upright position with the assistance of a hydraulic jack and held in place from below by steel supports. The Cauldron, plus the entire mechanical apparatus to move it into position, weighed in excess of 405 tons.

This process was designed to occur automatically at the press of a button to prevent the need for human labour that could prove dangerous and distracting during the opening ceremony. The cauldron took 16 minutes to move into position, and this was timed to happen alongside the parade of athletes on the field below to minimise alerting spectators and camera crews. The Cauldron started moving at 10:08 pm and was in place by 10:24 pm in time for its scheduled lighting at 11:30 pm.

== History and use ==
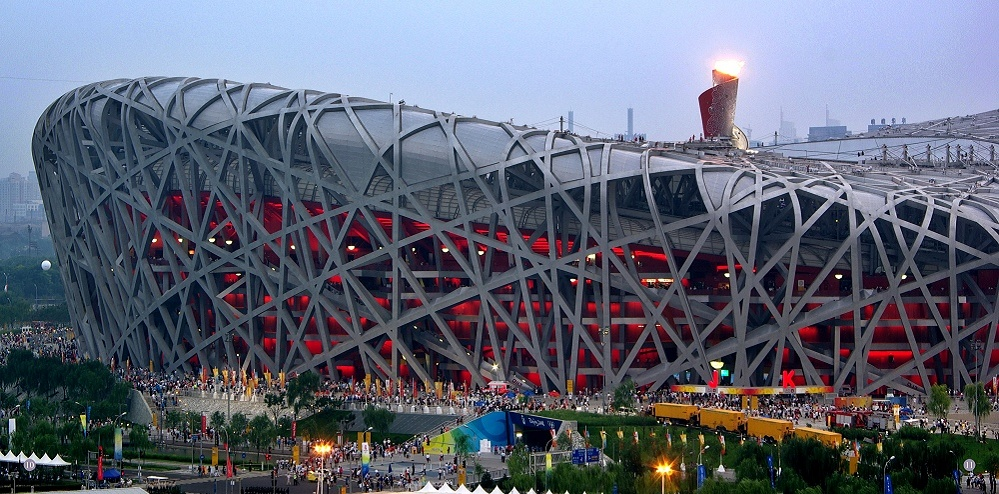
The Cauldron, aflame, viewed from outside the Bird's Nest.

The Cauldron was used to hold the Olympic flame, the symbol of the Olympics. It draws this tradition from the Ancient Olympics and Greek Mythology. The flame symbolises the theft of fire from Gods by the titan Prometheus, and a sacred fire was kept continuously burning throughout the duration of Ancient Olympics. The Modern Flame traces its origin to the 1928 Amsterdam Olympics and the torch relay – the tradition in which the Olympic flame travels from Olympia, the birthplace of the Olympics, across country to the host city – to the 1936 Olympics in Berlin.

The flame of the XXIX Olympiad was lit in Olympia, Greece on March 24, 2008, and travelled 137,000 km (85,000 mi) across all 6 inhabited continents over the course of 129 days. There were multiple protests and demonstrations against the Chinese government's human rights record (particularly in regards to the sovereignty of Tibet) over the course of the relay and the flame had to be extinguished for security reasons at 2 stages of the relay. The torch arrived in China for the domestic leg of the relay on May 4 and toured 103 Chinese cities, attractions and landmarks before reaching Beijing on August 8, the day of the Opening Ceremony."

The Cauldron was lit as part of the Opening Ceremony at Beijing National Stadium on August 8 by former Chinese Gymnast Li Ning. Li was lifted into the air on cables and completed a lap of the stadium, mimicking running along the "parchment" of the stadium's rim, as images of the torch relay were projected over the scroll. Li lit the Torch's wicker in front of a crowd of 90,000 spectators and an estimated television audience of between 1 and 4 billion people. Once lit, the flame continued burning throughout the duration of the Olympics.

After 16 days, The Flame was extinguished as part of the closing ceremony of the Olympics on August 24, 2008. After the extinguishing at the closing ceremony, it was retracted on its hydraulic track back onto the roof of the stadium, hidden from view of the spectators below.

The Cauldron was relighted during the Paralympics, being lighted this time by Chinese high-jump athlete Hou Bin, the first Chinese Paralympian to win 3 Gold medals for the same event at 3 consecutive Paralympics, as part of the opening ceremony on September 6. It was extinguished again for the final time during the Paralympic closing ceremony on September 17, 2008.

The Cauldron's Lighting Ceremony was praised by international media. Valkerie Mangnall, of the Australian Associated Press, said of the event: "The way of lightening the torch is amazing, I didn't expect he (Li Ning) will run the long way along the stadium. At the beginning I was guessing what is the image on the screen before I realized it's the scroll being unfolded with so many torch bearers. That is so full of imagination." It was considered the crowning jewel of a critically acclaimed opening ceremony, exemplary of the Ceremonies theme of celebrating China's ancient culture and heritage. Kent Ewing, writing in the Asia Times, described it as a "stunning opening ceremony ... with its panoply of color, painstaking choreography and sweeping portrait of Chinese culture and history" (while also criticising its seriousness). It was described as "an exhilarating display of China's thousands of years of traditions of art and culture" by USA Today, and the Art Daily applauded its celebration of China's ancient history.

== Cauldron lighters ==
=== Li Ning ===
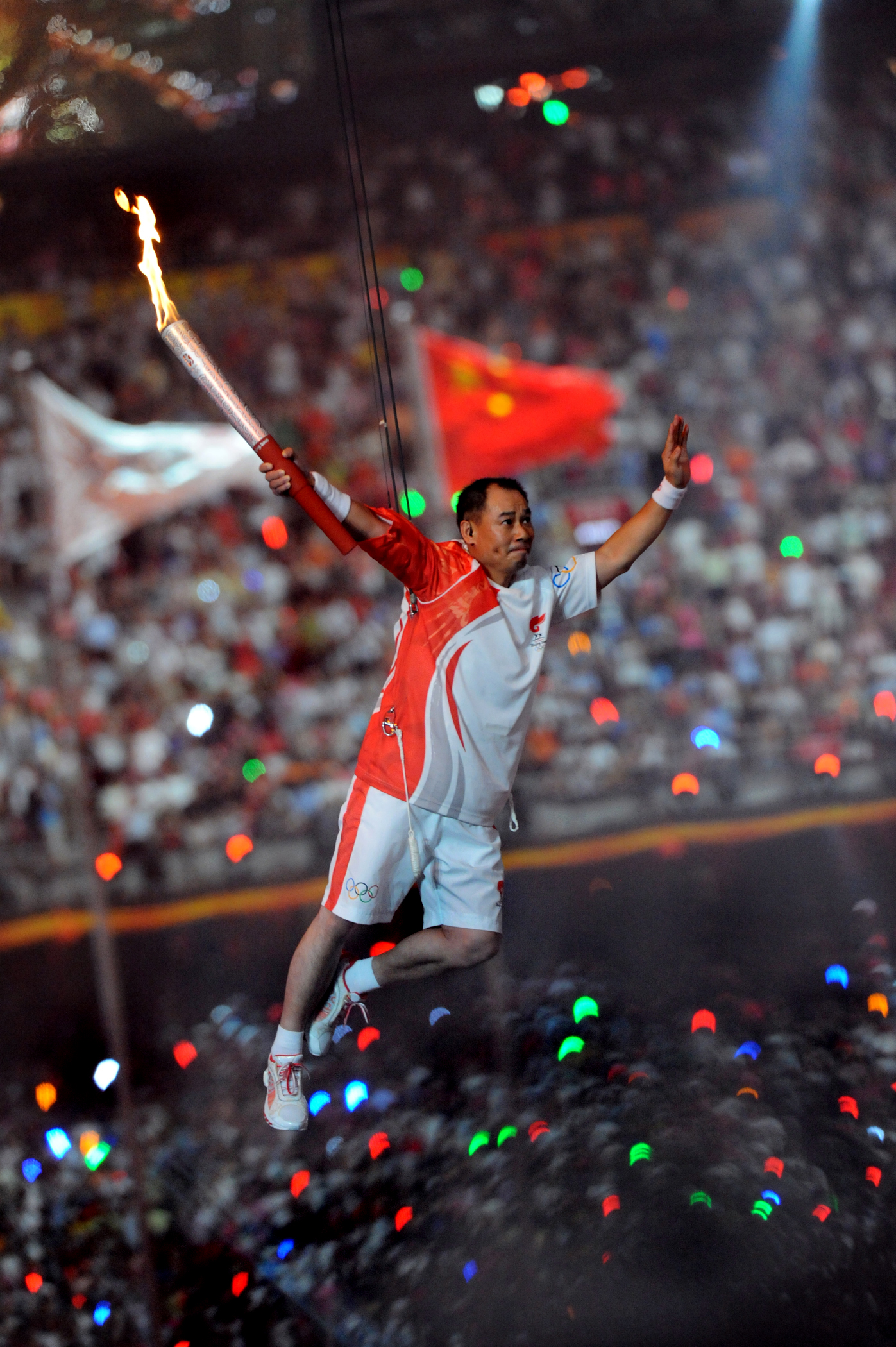
Li Ning, carrying the Olympic torch, descends from the Cauldron after lighting it. August 8, 2008

Chinese Gymnast and entrepreneur Li Ning (born March 10, 1963) was selected to light the Cauldron for the games of the XXIX Olympiad. Li is one of China's most decorated Olympic Athletes, winning 6 Olympic medals, including 3 Gold at the 1984 Olympics in Los Angeles. He won a further 11 medals at the Artistic Gymnastics World Championships across the 1980s. Over his career, Li has won over 106 gold medals across numerous events and competitions. His events were men's floor exercise, men's pommel horse, men's rings, men's vault, and Team all-round. Li retired from sporting competitions in 1988, after competing at the 1988 Seoul Olympics.

Following his gymnastics career, Li became a successful entrepreneur, founding Li-Ning Company Limited in 1990, which sells footwear and sporting apparel. He remains the company's CEO, and according to Hurun Report's China Rich list, this has enabled him to amass a net worth of RMB5billion (approx. US$700 million) making him one of China's richest people.

In 2000, Li Ning was inducted into the International Gymnastics Hall of Fame, becoming the first Chinese national to achieve that honour.

Li was the last of 8 torch bearers for the opening ceremony of the Beijing Olympics on August 8, 2008, and the one chosen to light the cauldron. In his role, he was lifted into the air on wires and then a lap around the brim of the stadium. Li mimed running in slow motion, and a projection of an unfurling scroll was projected in front of him, on which was displayed images of the torch relay for the 129 days leading up to the Games. When he reached the cauldron, Li lit a long fuse, sending a wall of flame searing up along the spiralling edge of the cauldron.

Li Ning was praised for his role in the Games Opening Ceremony, with Chinese Media describing the event as a moment when China's national achievements and ambitions won acceptance on a world stage. Liu Qi, head of the Beijing Organising Committee for the Olympic Games called the spectacle a "dazzling historic moment".

Li's net worth increased an estimated US$30 million the night of the games, due to a rise in the share price of his eponymous sporting brand thanks to exposure from the ceremony.

=== Hou Bin ===
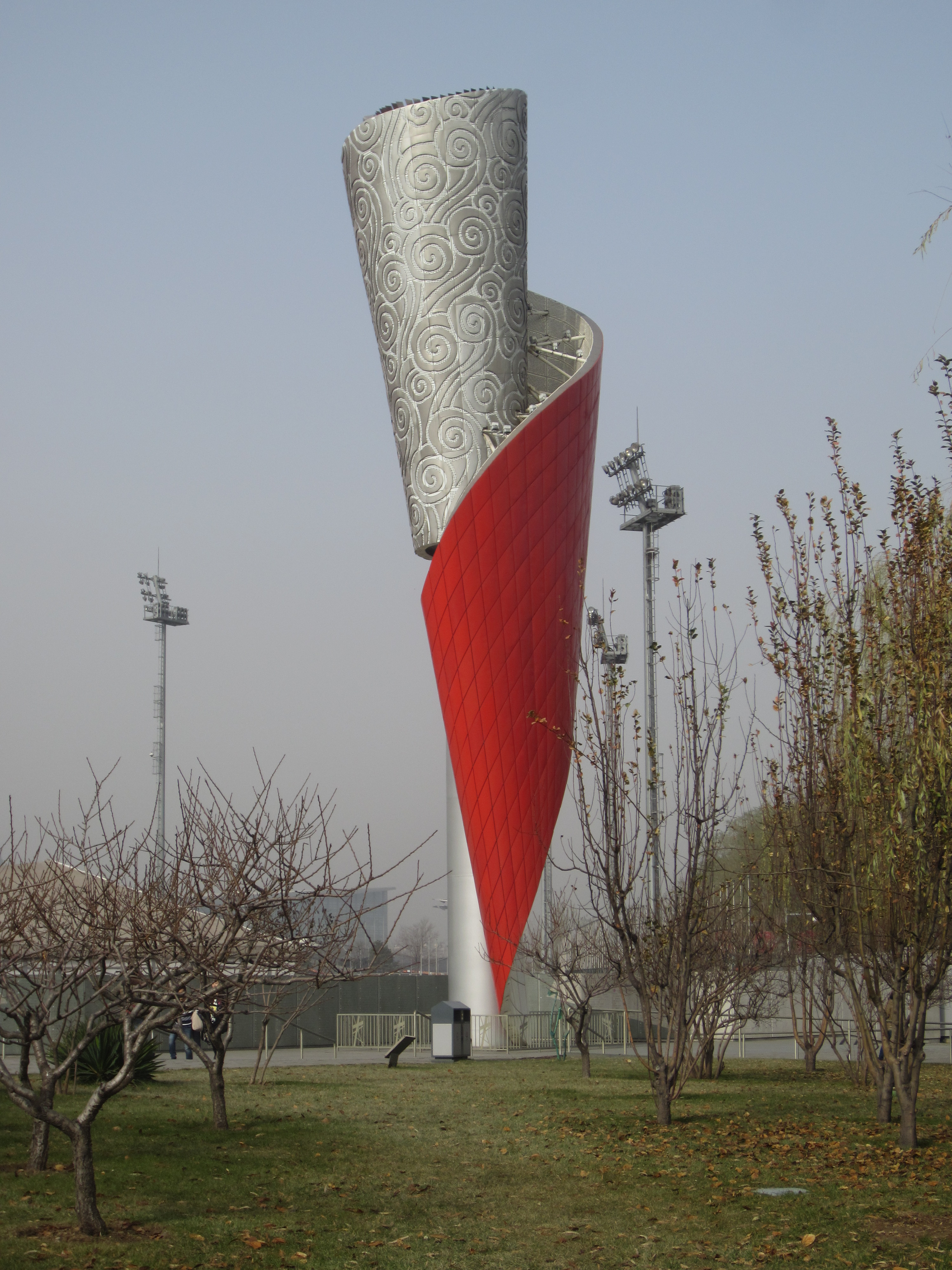
The cauldron in 2016

Hou Bin (born 1975), a Chinese former Track and Field athlete, relit the Cauldron as part of the opening ceremony for the 2008 Beijing Paralympics. Hou is an amputee Paralympian specialising in Long Jump, having lost his left leg in an accident at the age of 9. He won 3 gold medals for high jump in 3 consecutive Paralympic games in Atlanta 1996, Sydney 2000, and Athens 2004, becoming the first Chinese Paralympian to do so.

During the opening ceremony on September 6, Hou was attached to suspended wires and pulled himself and his wheelchair up above the stadium floor with his hands to light the Cauldron's fuse. With the torch attached to his wheelchair, and suffering a broken finger he sustained from an earlier practise, he achieved the 127 feet climb in 3 minutes in front of a crowd of 90,000 spectators.

Hou Bin's feat of strength was praised by Chinese and International media. Sir Philip Craven, then president of the International Paralympic Committee, said of his accomplishment: "To watch him climb a rope from the stadium floor to the roof, with a broken finger rubbing on the rope, and with a flame on his chair, was one of the most amazing things I've ever seen. That was the Paralympic spirit in action."

Following the Games and his retirement from athletics, Hou Bin has become a motivational speaker and activist for people with disabilities. In 2013, he launched the fundraising project "Stand Up Again", to help provide prosthetics to children injured 2008 Sichuan and 2013 Yu'an Earthquakes.

== Fate ==
The cauldron remained at the top of the stadium following the completion of the games until September 25, 2010, when it was removed and dismantled. Following cleaning, renovation and reinforcements of its steel plates, it was relocated to outside the stadium on the Olympic Green, northeast of the Stadium and close to the Ling Long Pagoda, and put on public display.
