= Ling Long =

Ling Long or Linglong (Chinese: 玲珑; lit. 'delicate') may refer to:

- Ling Long (magazine), a Chinese women's magazine
- Ling Long (mathematician) (born 1970s), Chinese mathematician
- Ling Long Pagoda, an Olympic broadcasting studio in Beijing, China
- Linglong Tire, a Chinese tire manufacturing company
  - Linglong SuperLiga, a Serbian professional football league sponsored by Linglong Tire
