= Hao Guohua =

Chinese goalball judge

Personal information
- Nationality: China

Hao Guohua is a Chinese goalball judge. He is a member of the current 2010-2014 Goalball Referees Committee.

At the 2008 Summer Paralympics in Beijing, Hao took the Officials' Oath for judges at the Beijing National Stadium during the Opening Ceremonies.
