= Olympic Channel =

Website and app about Olympic sports

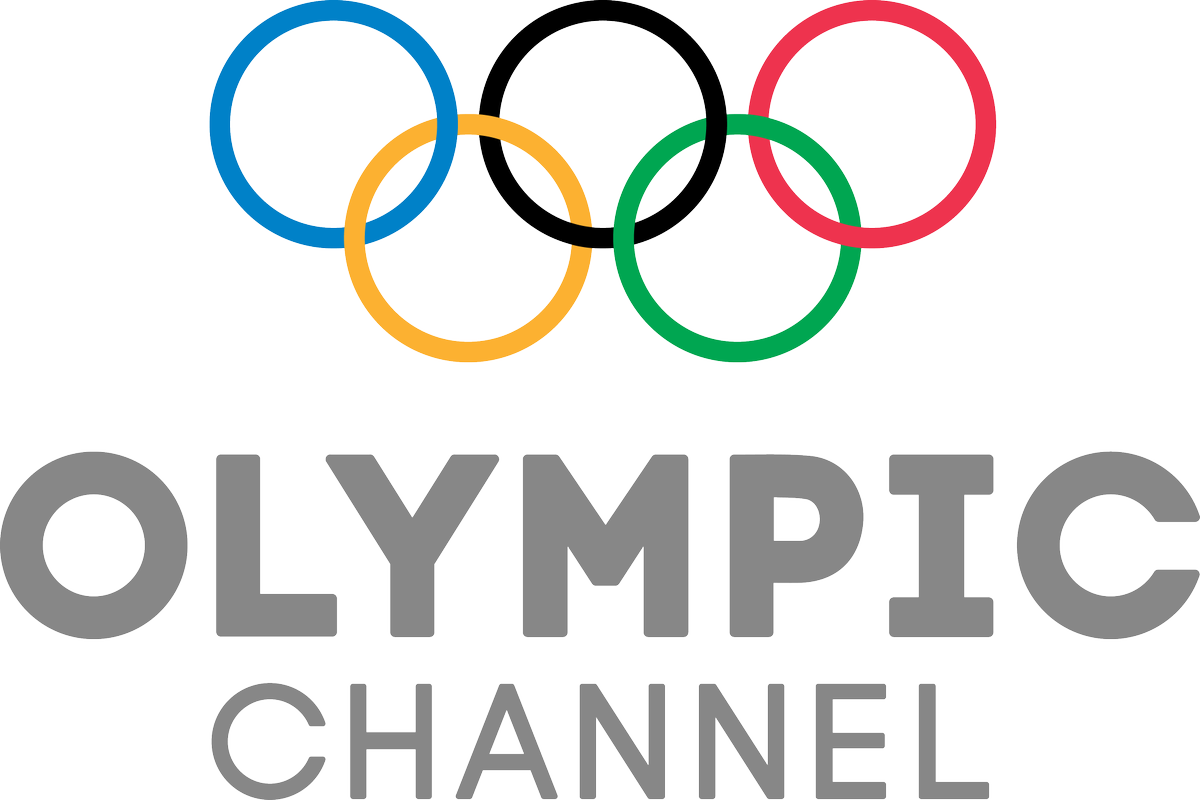
- Broadcast area: Worldwide
- Headquarters: Madrid, Spain

Programming
- Language: English
- Picture format: HDTV (1080i 16:9)

Ownership
- Owner: International Olympic Committee
- Key people: Executive Director Yiannis Exarchos (2015-present)

History
- Launched: August 21, 2016; 10 years ago

Links
- Website: olympics.com/olympic-channel

Availability

Streaming media
- Olympics.com: Live Stream
- YouTube TV: Internet Protocol television

Olympic Channel is an over-the-top Internet television service operated by the International Olympic Committee (IOC). It was launched on August 21, 2016, alongside the closing of the 2016 Summer Olympics. The service aims to maintain year-round interest in the Olympic movement, carrying documentaries and other programming chronicling the Olympic Games, as well as coverage of events in Olympic sport outside of the Games.

The IOC operates the service with an international focus, but also stated plans to work with local National Olympic Committees and rightsholders to establish localized versions and linear services as franchised versions of Olympic Channel.

== Goal ==
The service's main goal is to maintain year-round interest in Olympic sports between iterations of the Summer and Winter Olympics, especially among a younger audience; it features coverage of competitions in Olympic sport, as well as short and long-form programmes focusing on Olympic athletes. The service initially broadcast in English, with subtitles available in nine other languages on-launch.

Yiannis Exarchos, overseer of Olympic Channel and CEO of Olympic Broadcasting Services, stated that the service's content would focus primarily on the stories of athletes, arguing that "We need to take some risks and it's better to take risks now because we're stronger than we’ve ever been. The personalities of athletes, their lifestyles, are something very, very attractive."

== History ==
IOC president Thomas Bach, who originally proposed the concept of an Olympics-oriented television channel in 1994 when he was a junior officer of the IOC, stated that the service would be "the start of an exciting new journey to connect the worldwide audience with the Olympic Movement all year round". The channel is produced out of Madrid, and was allocated a seven-year budget of US$600 million.

The initial digital service has an international focus, but the IOC stated that it plans to work with National Olympic Committees and local rightsholders to develop local versions of the Olympic Channel, which may optionally include linear television channels. The streaming platform is provided by Playmaker Media, a division of NBC Sports Group.

== Regional versions ==
=== Canada ===
Olympic Channel was added to CBC Television's streaming platform CBC Gem on July 23, 2020.

=== France ===
Sport en France is a broadband television channel launched in 2019 and carried by the country's four main triple play operators. Although not explicitly branded as a French version of the Olympic Channel, it was created by the French National Olympic and Sports Committee (CNOSF) and follows a similar concept, aiming to provide regular coverage of sports which have struggled to carve a niche on general-interest and for-profit sports networks.

=== Middle East and North Africa ===
On 4 September 2017, the IOC announced a partnership with beIN Sports to launch a linear Olympic Channel for the Middle East and North Africa (MENA) region, which launched on 1 November 2017. As a lead-up to the launch, the network broadcast a daily block of Olympic Channel programming on its main channel.

=== United States ===
At an industry forum in March 2017, NBC Olympics president Gary Zenkel stated that NBCUniversal would launch a localized version of Olympic Channel in the United States as a linear television channel later in the year. The U.S. version of Olympic Channel launched July 15, 2017, replacing Universal HD—which itself had picked up overflow Olympic sports content following the discontinuation of Universal Sports in 2015.

On July 1, 2022, NBC announced that Olympic Channel would end its current operation as a U.S. linear cable channel on September 30, 2022, but indicated its programming would be moved to other NBCUniversal platforms.

=== South America ===
In January 2019, the IOC announced a partnership with Claro TV and Claro Video to distribute Olympic Channel programming on its Claro Sports linear channel and video streaming service to South American countries.

=== China ===
In January 2019, China Media Group announced plans to launch a Chinese version of the channel. Named CCTV-16, the channel launched on 25 October 2021.
