= Yiannis Exarchos =

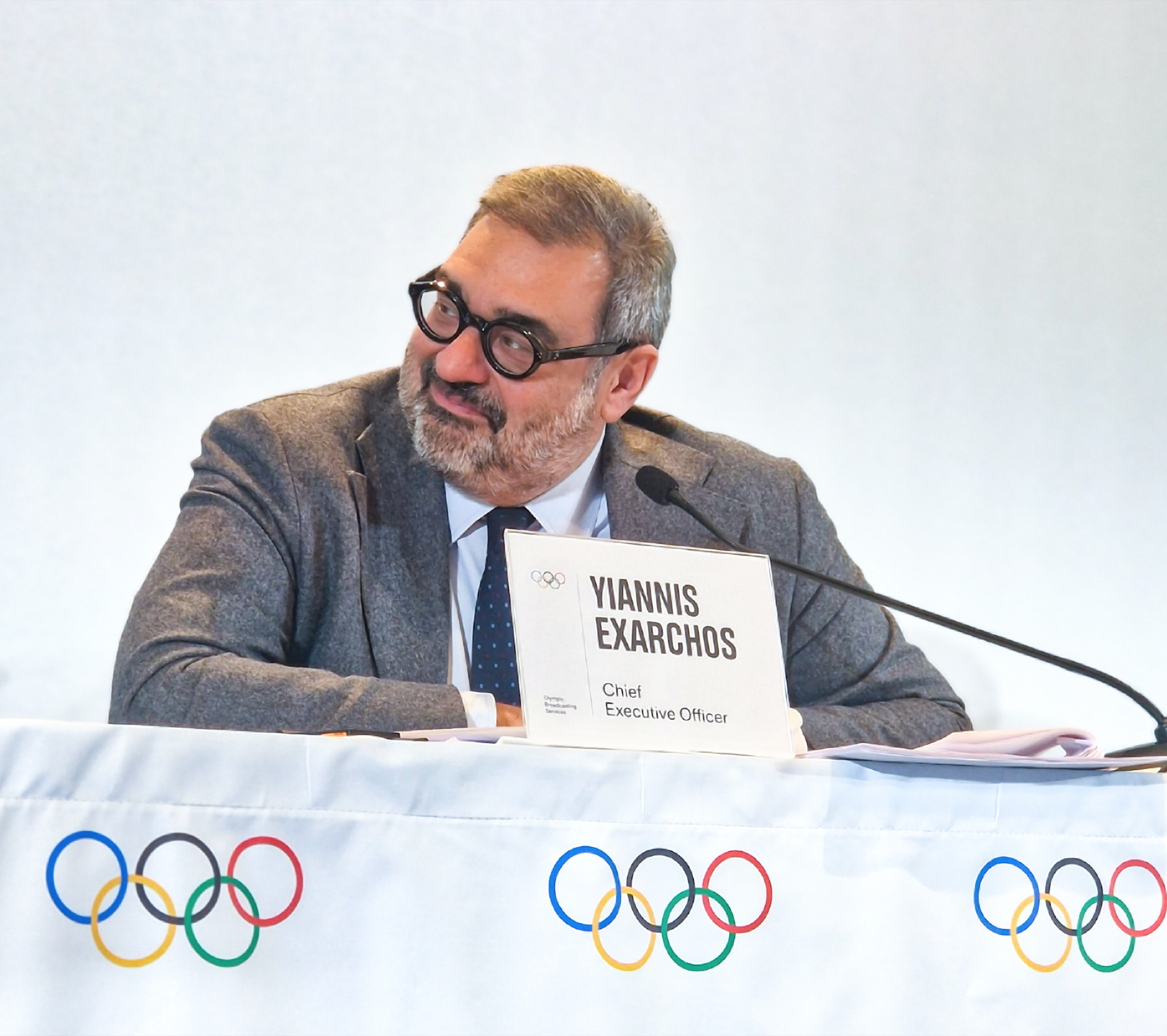
- Born: June 1, 1964 (age 62); Greece
- Occupations: CEO of Olympic Broadcasting Services (OBS) (2012-present), Executive Director of Olympic Channel Services (OCS) (2015-present) Media Executive, Television Executive

Yiannis (Ioannis) Exarchos - Γιάννης (Ιωάννης) Έξαρχος (1 June 1964) is a Greek television executive and sports broadcasting professional, serving since 2012, as the CEO of Olympic Broadcasting Services (OBS), an organisation created by the International Olympic Committee (IOC) to serve as the permanent host broadcaster for all Olympic, Youth Olympic Games and other events organized by the IOC. He was appointed to this position following the Olympic Games London 2012, after having served as a top executive for all Olympic host broadcasting organisations since Athens 2004. In 2015, he was also named Executive Director of Olympic Channel Services (OCS).

== Early life and education ==
Exarchos was born in Athens, Greece. After graduating from the Greek school Athens College in 1983, he enrolled at the University of Athens where he studied law. Concurrently (1984-1987), he also studied Film Directing at the Stavrakos Film School.

== Career ==
=== Film and radio ===
Exarchos served as a presenter on programmes related to music and film, starting in 1983, where he worked at Greek public service and private radio networks, ERA-4, ERA-2, ERA-5, Kanali 15, TOP FM, FLASH 961, RADIO, and RODON. At ERA-4, he served as the Head of Programming, while at FLASH 961, he was the Head of the music department.

=== Television ===
In 1992, he was appointed special counsellor to the General Manager of ET-2, a network of Hellenic Radio and Television ERT, the Greek public service broadcaster. He was also a member and Vice–President of the Union of Greek Film Critics. During the same period, from 1986 to 1989, he produced and presented the cultural talk show Vathos Pediou (Depth of Field) on the same network, conducting long-form interviews with a series of major figures of Greek arts and culture. Additionally, in 1986, he served as presenter and producer of the weekly cultural television programme Chromata (Colours) on the main channel of ERT. Later in 1994, he became Special Counsellor to the ERT President before assuming the role of General Manager of ET-2 - NET in 1996.

He became the Executive Director of ERT in 1997 and held the position until 2001. As Executive Director, he oversaw the restructuring of the public service broadcaster, which included consolidating news programming and production and technical resources.

Between 1994-2001, he also served as a member of the Administrative Council of the European Broadcasting Union (EBU), the union of European public service broadcasters. He played a role in the millennium celebrations of EBU, overseeing the production of the Greek portion of the coordinated series of worldwide events to celebrate and commemorate the end of 1999 and start of 2000.

While working with private stations and ERT, Exarchos also lectured at Greek Universities in subjects related to broadcasting, music and film.

== Olympic career ==
While still at ERT, Exarchos assisted the Athens 2004 Bid Committee with the content specifically related to media and broadcast matters.

In 2001, he was appointed Director General of Athens Olympic Broadcasting (AOB), working under the leadership of Olympic broadcaster Manolo Romero. He later moved to Beijing, where he served as Senior Executive Officer for Beijing Olympic Broadcasting (BOB), the Host Broadcaster for the Beijing 2008 Olympic and Paralympic Games. Before the end of 2008 he moved to Madrid, assuming the role of deputy CEO of Olympic Broadcasting Services (OBS), and following the Olympic Games London 2012 he was appointed CEO.

The global broadcast of the Olympic Games Athens 2004 was the strongest in Olympic history at the time, as record levels of coverage reached an unprecedented global audience of 3.9 billion people in 220 countries and territories. Additionally, the presence of digital media began to surface with broadcasters in certain territories and markets making Athens 2004 coverage available via video streams on dedicated websites and, using 3G technology, through streaming video and highlight clips on mobile phones.

Following the conclusion of the Athens Olympics, Exarchos moved to Beijing where he held the post of Senior Executive Officer for BOB – Beijing Olympic Broadcasting (BOB), the Host Broadcaster for the Beijing 2008 Olympic and Paralympic Games.

Following the close of Beijing 2008, Exarchos moved to Madrid, Spain where he was appointed Deputy CEO of Olympic Broadcasting Services (OBS), the organisation created by the International Olympic Committee (IOC) to serve as the permanent host broadcaster for all Olympic Games. He was named CEO of the company, a position he currently holds, following the Olympic Games London 2012.

The Olympic Winter Games Sochi 2014 marked his first Games as CEO. For these Games, OBS introduced the Olympic Video Player (OVP), an advanced multi-platform video player made available to Media Rights-Holders (MRHs). In Sochi 2014, the Olympic Video Player (OVP) was introduced, and for the first time, the amount of digital coverage on MRH social media channels, apps, and websites exceeded that of linear television.

== Awards ==
- Emmy Award 2004 outstanding live event turnaround, the Games of the XXVIII Olympiad, NBC, Producer.
- Emmy Award 2004 outstanding technical team – studio, the Games of the XXVIII Olympiad, NBC, Technical Supervisor.
- Emmy Award 2008 outstanding live event turnaround, Games of the XXIX Olympiad, NBC, Producer.
- Emmy Award 2012 outstanding live event turnaround, Games of the XXX Olympiad, NBC, Producer.
- Emmy Award 2014 outstanding technical team remote, XXII Olympic Winter Games, NBC, Technical Supervisor.
- Emmy Award 2021-2022 "What Agnes saw" outstanding public service announcement / campaign, StrongerTogether Olympics.com, Executive Producer.
- Emmy Award 2021-2022 outstanding interactive experience – event coverage, Games of the XXXII Olympiad, NBC, Coordinating Producer.
- Emmy Award 2021-2022 outstanding interactive experience – event coverage, Games of the XXXII Olympiad, NBC, Olympic Broadcasting Services.
- Emmy Award 2022-2023 "The Redeem Team", outstanding long documentary, Netflix, Producer.
- Emmy Award 2022-2023 Outstanding live special, XXIV Olympic Winter Games, NBC, Producer.
- Emmy Award 2022-2023 Outstanding live special, XXIV Olympic Winter Games, NBC, Olympic Broadcasting Services.

He has also received 36 Telly Awards, 8 Webby Awards, 6 AVA digital Awards and 2 honourable mentions, 2 VR Expo Awards, 2 Sportel Awards, 2 Guirlande d'or and 1 Milano International FICTS Festival Award, 1 Czech Film critics Award, 2 AIPS Sports Media Awards, 2 Sportel Awards, 5 Jaipur International Film Festival Awards, 1 Real Screen Award, 1 International Ski Association Award.

He has also received an award from the Greek National Olympic Committee for his long-term contribution to the Olympic Movement.

He is also a member of the Greek Commission of the United Nations Educational, Scientific and Cultural Organisation (UNESCO).

== Credits ==
=== Olympic Games ===
- Olympic and Paralympic Games Athens 2004 Host Broadcast, Producer.
- Olympic and Paralympic Games Beijing 2008 Host Broadcast, Producer.
- Olympic and Paralympic Games Vancouver 2010 Host Broadcast, Producer.
- Olympic and Paralympic Games London 2012 Host Broadcast, Producer.
- Olympic and Paralympic Winter Games Sochi 2014 Host Broadcast, Executive Producer.
- Olympic and Paralympic Games Rio 2016 Host Broadcast, Executive Producer.
- Olympic and Paralympic Games PyeongChang 2018 Host Broadcast, Executive Producer.
- Olympic and Paralympic Games Tokyo 2020 Host Broadcast, Executive Producer.
- Olympic and Paralympic Games Paris 2024 Host Broadcast, Executive Producer.

== Personal life ==
He lives in Madrid with his wife Vana Voutsela. His native language is Greek and he is also fluent in English, French and Spanish.
