= 2008 Summer Paralympics opening ceremony =

- Part of 2008 Summer Paralympics
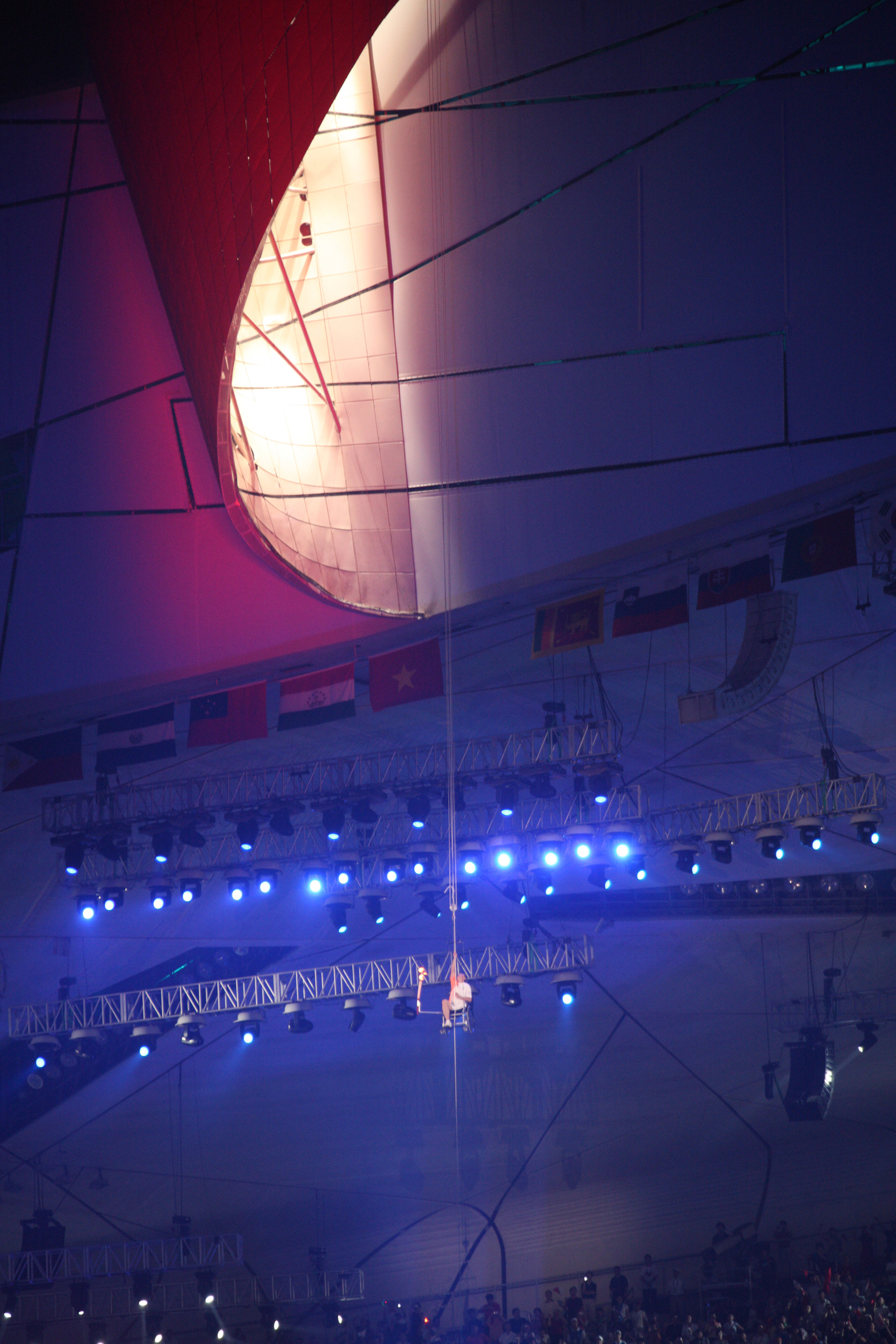
- Lighting of the cauldron during the opening ceremony of the Beijing 2008 Paralympic Games
- Date: 6 September 2008
- Venue: Beijing National Stadium
- Location: Beijing, China
- Theme: "One World, One Dream" "Transcendence, Integration, Equality"
- Filmed by: Beijing Olympic Broadcasting (BOB)

The 2008 Summer Paralympics opening ceremony was held at the Beijing National Stadium on September 6, 2008 just two weeks after the end of the 2008 Summer Olympics. The event was themed "One World, One Dream" and "Transcendence, Integration, Equality." The show was attended by about 91,000 to 100,000 spectators. It was approximately 3-hours in length and consisted of 6,000 performers and 4,000 disabled athletes from 148 countries.

== Pre-ceremony performance ==
The site of pre-ceremony performance is the Small Stage to the north of the field. After Pre-ceremony performance, the hosts give interactive guidance to the audience for 40 minutes. The pre-ceremony performance included a series of musical performances.

1. Military Music Performance: Welcome March
2. Folk Music Performance: Good News from Beijing Reaches the Border Villages
3. Drum Music Performance: Ebullient Festival
4. Male Solo: Come on!
5. Male-female Duet: Happy Gathering in Beijing
6. Lead and Chorus: Every one is No. 1 performed by Andy Lau
7. Male-female Duet: Miracle in the East
8. Grand Chorus: The Blue Danube
9. Male-female Duet and Chorus: The Drinking Song
10. Grand Chorus: Ode to Joy
11. Chorus: Beijing, Beijing, I Love Beijing

== Opening ceremony ==
=== Welcoming ceremony ===
President of China Hu Jintao makes an entrance along with Philip Craven, president of the International Paralympic Committee. Countdown started several children displayed cards with "60", "50" and "20" after distributing fireworks in Tiananmen Square for 10 seconds and starting at 19:59:50 China Standard Time at the country and sky above the stadium is the same as the countdown to the 2008 Beijing Olympics closing ceremony from "10" to "1" with all voice screaming as "10, 9, 8, 7, 6, 5, 4, 3, 2, 1" or "Shi!!!, Jiu!!!, Ba!!!, Qi!!!, Liu!!!, Wu!!!, Si!!!, San!!! Er!!!, Yi!!!" and "0" (the moment of opening) is used to release large-scale fireworks above the stadium to the Games and herald the start of the officially opening time at 20:00:00 China Standard Time. The flag of the PRC is unfurled and raised while the military band of the PLAGF Honor Guard Soldiers raise the flag and play the national anthem March of the Volunteers. More fireworks are displayed. Cartoon marathon athletes wear suits of different colors to form a line of rainbow. The rainbow stripe stretches around the stadium. They form the symbol of the Paralympic Games.

=== Parade of nations ===
As with the 2008 Summer Olympics, the ceremony included a parade of nations, with a flag bearer for each national team. . As Chinese is written in characters and not letters, the order of the teams' entry was determined by the number of strokes in the first character of their respective countries' Simplified Chinese names. In this list the host country came last Countries with the same number of strokes in the first character are sorted by those of the next character. This made Guinea (几内亚) the first country to enter as it takes two strokes to write the first character in the country's name (几). A total of 148 nations enter in the predetermined order. With the Paralympic Games, athletes enter the stadium first and then watch the performances together with the audience. A huge feather consisting of 148 feathers is formed within the Bird's Nest, with each feather symbolizing the ideal of all people with disability in the world.

=== Artistic section ===
Sound of birds chirping resonate in the otherwise silent stadium. A sunbird flies from the top of the Bird's Nest. Then the sunbird flies down to the golden meadow in the field to awaken a blind singer from his sleep. The sunbird chirps in front of him, and the singer translates the sunbird's message for the whole audience with sign language. Meanwhile, Chinese and English voice-over is aired "there are dreams in life after all". The sunbird and the blind singer Yang Haitao (杨海涛) walk onto the center stage in the field together referred to as the "White Jade Plate". Yang performs the song "Heaven" (天域), then saids "My name is Yang Haitao. I am blind. My home is China. If I can see the light for three days, I want to see my father, my mother and you the most..." A white cloud appears, then a trumpeter plays the music of "Hello, Stars" and 300 deaf girls communicate with sign languages, led by 50 sign language teachers. The girls form a series of circles at the "White Jade Plate" and expand. Fireworks are lighted.

A girl with one leg appears in a wheelchair. She wears one red shoe, as she lost one of her legs in the Sichuan earthquake. She is circled by a group of ballet performers dancing with arm aerobics wearing shoes in their hands. The girl in the center is then carried around.

Blind pianist Jin Yuanhui (金元辉) plays the piano to accompany the four seasons theme. The plate panels are rotated in different colors to represent different sceneries.

Then 2,000 space robots appear in a circle. They change into the four forms of frog, seagull, cow and duck with a popular cartoon dance. The audience imitate the sounds of these animals: "Croak! Croak! Croak!" " Moo! Moo! Moo!" and "Quack! Quack! Quack!" Fireworks are displayed. The Paralympics mascot Fu Niu Lele (福牛乐乐) is represented.

A female singer pushing a baby carriage and a male singer walk and sing on the White Jade Plate. 100 female dancers slowly flow to the White Jade Plate like a galaxy. Thousands of luminous silver threads pull the whole Earth, as if he is carrying a traveling bag full of mountains, rivers and lands of the whole world. A display of 750 performers form birds and swans with their hands. On the blue backdrop it appears as birds or animals in the sky.

=== Speeches and protocol segments ===
Liu Qi, head of the Beijing Organizing Committee for the Olympic Games accompanies Philip Craven, president of the IPC, to the podium to give an address. Paramount leader Hu Jintao then declares the Paralympics games opened at 22:36 Beijing time.

=== Paralympic flame lighting of the flame cauldron ===
After a performance of the theme song Flying with the Dream by Han Hong and Andy Lau, the Paralympic flag was raised by PLA Army from Beijing Garrison Honor Guard Battalion and the Paralympic anthem played.

Representatives of the athletes and judges then take an oath. Chinese goalball judge Hao Guohua took the Paralympic oath on behalf of all officials, while Paralympic runner Wu Chunmiao took the oath on behalf of the competitors.

The first torchbearer, Jin Jing, brought in the Olympic torch lit from the Temple of Heaven in Beijing. It was handed down by six torchbearers. The Paralympic flame is transferred last by Ping Yali to Hou Bin, the high jump gold medalist with one leg. In his wheelchair, Hou Bin pulls himself up to the cauldron and the flame is lit. A long series of fireworks is displayed around the stadium.
