= 2008 Summer Paralympics closing ceremony =

- Part of 2008 Summer Paralympics
- Date: 17 September 2008
- Venue: Beijing National Stadium
- Location: Beijing, China
- Filmed by: Beijing Olympic Broadcasting (BOB)

The 2008 Summer Paralympics closing ceremony was held at the Beijing National Stadium, also known as the Bird's Nest. It began at 8:00 pm China Standard Time (UTC+8) on September 17, 2008. The number 8 is associated with prosperity and confidence in Chinese culture.

== Sequence of events ==
The closing ceremony took place on September 17, 2008 in the National Stadium . The sequence of events was;

1. People's Liberation Army Navy Band performed the "Welcome March" song to welcome Hu Jintao, President of China and Philip Craven, President of the International Paralympic Committee
2. Countdown started from "60", "50", "40", "30", "20", "10" to "1" as highlights of this 2008 Summer Paralympics games countdown were shown with countdown numbers on the screen to the Games and herald the start of the officially closing time at 20:00:00 China Standard Time.
3. Raising and unfurling fly end the national flag of China and playing the Chinese national anthem
4. Entrance of the flags of all delegations
5. Entrance of the athletes of all delegations
6. Performance: Write the Postcard – "Cartoon postmen" come to the Bird's Nest to invite audience members to write their wishes on postcards. The closing ceremony of the Paralympic Games will be presented on a plain stage, a stretch of ordinary lawn serving as the center of the performances. When the spectators first enter the National Stadium, they find no stage in a traditional sense in the huge stadium, only a stretch of grass. Director Zhang Yimou assured reporters that the field of the Bird's Nest was left in its original state on purpose, to serve as the backdrop for closing ceremony performances. He believes that the field itself expresses a language of art. At the closing ceremony, flowers will bloom on the grass, forming the words "A Letter to the Future" in both Chinese and English.
7. The Whang Youn Dai Achievement Award was given out shortly after the firework to two recipients.

- Said Gomez, a participant of athletics for Panama, aged 42, is a five-time Paralympian. He lost his sight at a young age and went through his father's discouragement and punishment to take part in his first Paralympics in 1992 where he won a gold and silver medals. The Panamanian NPC was only established in 2006 and prior to that, Gomez attended the Paralympics at his own expense. Since 1982, Gomez, who makes his living by farming, has been coaching children able bodied and with disabilities just for the love of sports. For the first time in his six Paralympics, Gomez returned home without a medal as he failed to progress through the first round in both his events – the 1,500m and 5,000m.
- Natalie du Toit, a South African swimmer, aged 24, who lost her lower left leg in a motorcycle accident in 2001, won five gold medals at the Beijing Paralympics to equal her haul from Athens. Du Toit is also the first female amputee to compete in an able-bodied Olympics. She finished 16th among 25 competitors in the 10-kilometer open-water swim at the Beijing Games.

1. New members of the IPC Athletes’ Commission are presented – The six new members of the Athlete's Commission present flowers to 12 representatives of Games volunteers.
2. Exit of the flags of all delegations.
3. Performance
  1. Red Leaves of Fragrant Hill – The red leaves of Fragrant Hill, a famous scenic spot in Beijing, are famous for their beautiful shape and dazzling colors. In this chapter, the red leaves become an artistic image representing the people of Beijing and all expressing sincere good wishes to friends from around the world.
  2. Sowing
  3. Watering
  4. Harvest
  5. Celebration
4. Performance: Mail It to the Future – One hundred "postmen" standing on top of the Bird's Nest drop petals ceremoniously; while another 100 "postmen" fly up and down the rim of the Bird's Nest like swan geese. They solemnly deliver the colorful postcards signed by Beijing people and the audience present to the athletes of all delegations, one by one... The "postmen" among the audience also drop the postcards of the audience into the postbox in the stadium to send them to the places all over the world through China Post.
5. Speeches
  1. Liu Qi, president of the Beijing Organizing Committee for the Olympic Games said "The Wishes of Red Leaves of Fragrant Hill, Paralympic athletes at Beijing have accomplished remarkable achievements by breaking 279 world records and 339 Paralympic records. They have shown their positive attitude toward life, such as self-respect, self-confidence, self-improvement and self-reliance. They have sung a hymn to humanity by displaying their sporting excellence."
  2. Sir Philip Craven, IPC president said "A Letter to the Future." "An ethereal Opening Ceremony. Staggering athletic performances in perfect stadia, The best-ever Paralympic villages. Amazing high-definition television coverage. A never-ending and self-generating supply of passion and emotion. Superb organization. Wonderful volunteers. Millions of new Paralympic sports aficionados both here in China and around the world. These are the greatest Paralympic Games ever."
6. Raising the national flag of Britain and playing the British national anthem.
7. Lowering and Folding the IPC flag.
8. IPC Flag Handover Ceremony – Beijing Mayor Guo Jinlong gives the IPC flag to Sir Philip Craven, who transfers it to London Mayor Boris Johnson.
9. London Handover Presentation – The London bus, previously used in the Olympic Games handover presentation returns. This time revealing an interior that is predominantly green with lush grass and a hedge cut into the shape of the London skyline. Paralympian Ade Adepitan guides the bus to the Stadium.
10. Extinguishing of the Paralympic flame – At the same time, all full innumerable dazzling fireworks were launched from the top of the "Beijing National Stadium". All full festival fireworks formed a huge circle of extravaganza all full fireworks were fired in a one-off event from all Beijing launching from the top of the building outwards above the many spectators and well wishers below farewell in the year in which Beijing went on to host the 2008 Beijing Paralympics Games say farewell. Fireworks were launched in the shape and colour of the see you 2012 London Paralympic Games in a display that all minutes compared to being reduced to all full minutes along with 2008 Summer Olympics closing ceremony symbolizing the successful back to home at closedown of 2008 Summer Paralympics. The closing ceremony ended at 21:30 CST because after closing ceremony ended due to all full firework displays.
