= Linglong (magazine) =

Chinese women's magazine (1931–1937)

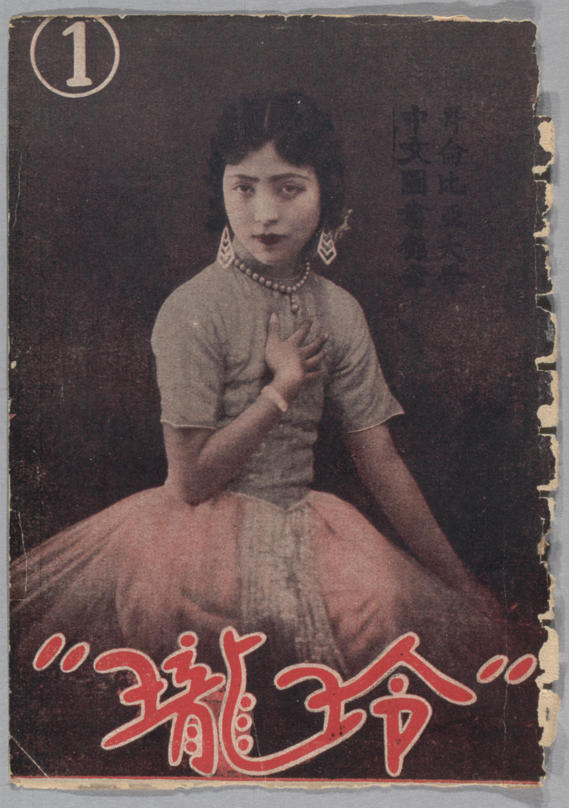
- First issue of Linglong, 1931.
- Categories: Women's magazines
- Frequency: Weekly
- Publisher: Sanhe Publishing House
- Founded: 1931
- First issue: 18 March 1931
- Final issue: 11 August 1937
- Country: China
- Based in: Shanghai
- Language: Chinese

Linglong (Chinese: 玲瓏; lit. 'Elegant and Fine') was a Chinese language weekly women's magazine published in Shanghai, China, from 1931 to 1937. It was one of the most popular women's magazine in China during its lifetime.

== History and profile ==
Linglong was established in 1931. The first issue appeared on 18 March 1931. The magazine stated its goal as follows: "to promote the exquisite life of women, and encourage lofty entertainment in society."

The publisher of Linglong was Sanhe Publishing House based in Shanghai. The magazine was financed by Lin Zecang, the head of the company. It was published in pocket-size on a weekly basis every Wednesday. Both men and women served on the editorial board of the magazine. The art editors of the magazine included Lin Zemin, Xu Bingduo, Zhao Baiye, Xu Jinsheng and Ye Qianyu.

Linglong was consisted of two major section, one for women-related issues and the other for entertainment and cinema. The former section included articles concerning daily lives of women, including cosmetics, house-keeping, Chinese and Hollywood movies and child rearing. The magazine openly discussed the topics related to sex through its authors, who were secondary school students. Several special issues were also published, such as about children and swimming and beach culture. However, from 1934 the magazine adopted a conservative stance. The major reader group were female students.

The magazine folded in 1937 after publishing a total of 298 issues with the last issue dated 11 August 1937. Columbia University digitized 228 of 298 issues of Linglong, and Heidelberg University contributed some 18 issues.
