= Ling Long (mathematician) =

Chinese-American mathematician

- Born: China
- Education: Penn State (Ph. D), Tshinghua University (B.S)
- Awards: Ruth I. Michler Memorial Prize
- Scientific career
- Fields: Mathematics: Number Theory
- Workplaces: Louisiana State University, Iowa State University, Cornell University
- Doctoral advisor: Wen-Ch'ing (Winnie) Li (Pennsylvania State University), Noriko Yui (Queen's University)

Ling Long is a Chinese American mathematician whose research concerns modular forms, arithmetic hypergeometric functions, as well as number theory in general. She is the Micheal F. and Roberta Nesbit McDonald Chair Professor of mathematics at Louisiana State University.

== Early life and education ==
Long studied mathematics and computer science at Tsinghua University, graduating in 1997. She went to Pennsylvania State University for her graduate studies; her dissertation, Modularity of Elliptic Surfaces, she worked on with Noriko Yui, visiting from Queen's University, in her time as a graduate student. She was supervised and influenced by Wen-Ching Winnie Li.

== Career ==
After postdoctoral research at the Institute for Advanced Study, Long joined the faculty at Iowa State University in 2003. After a year at Cornell University in 2012–2013, she moved to Louisiana State University.

== Recognition ==
Long was the 2012–2013 winner of the Ruth I. Michler Memorial Prize of the Association for Women in Mathematics. She was named to the 2023 class of Fellows of the American Mathematical Society, "for contributions to hypergeometric arithmetic, noncongruence Modular Forms, and supercongruences".

She is included in a deck of playing cards featuring notable women mathematicians published by the Association for Women in Mathematics.
