= Ling Long Pagoda =

Coordinates: 39.9959°N 116.3876°E

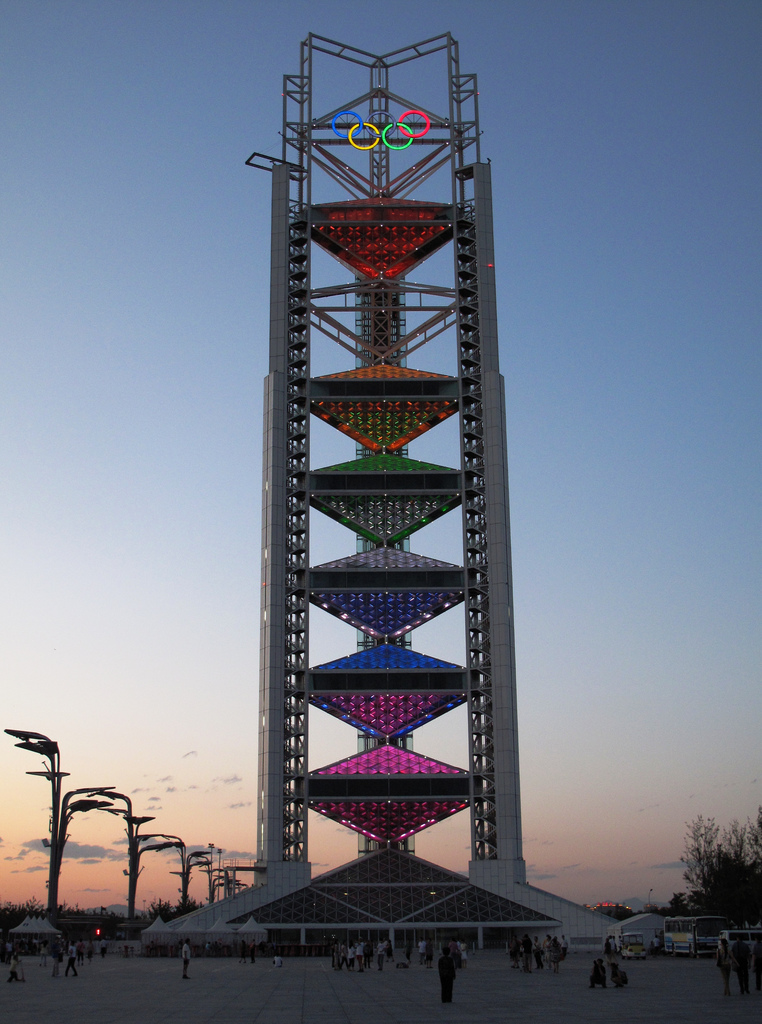
- Interactive map of the Ling Long Pagoda area

General information
- Location: Beijing, China

The Ling Long Pagoda or Linglong Tower (Multifunctional Studio Tower) (玲珑塔) houses a part of the International Broadcast Center (IBC). It is located near the Olympic Cauldron, on the northwest side of Beijing National Stadium. "Ling Long" (玲珑) means delicate, and is referred to as the Delicate Tower in Chinese.

== Description ==
The permanent structure is a three-sided tower. The tower contains 6 occupiable pods with open space in between. One of the pods displays the Olympic rings. It is 128m tall, with 7 occupiable floors, each an equilateral triangle. The floors are subdivided into two levels. The glass-walled pods are held up by three supporting ribs at the three corners.

During the 2008 Summer Olympics, the building was operated by Beijing Olympic Broadcasting. Some international broadcast studios were located in the pods of the tower, offering skyline views as backdrops of Olympic broadcasts. Each floor was occupied by a television network. CCTV, BBC, CBC Television for both French and English networks, France Télévisions - France 2 & France 3, and Mexican Olympic consortium, composed by Televisa and TV Azteca, shared use of the tower's studio facilities. CBC occupied the fourth pod from the bottom. BBC occupied the second pod from the bottom. France Television was on the third floor. NBC's Today Show tapes were made from the ground floor.

== See also ==
- Venues of the 2008 Summer Olympics
