= Olympic Broadcasting Services =

Host broadcaster for Olympic and Paralympic Games

Olympic Broadcasting Services S.L.

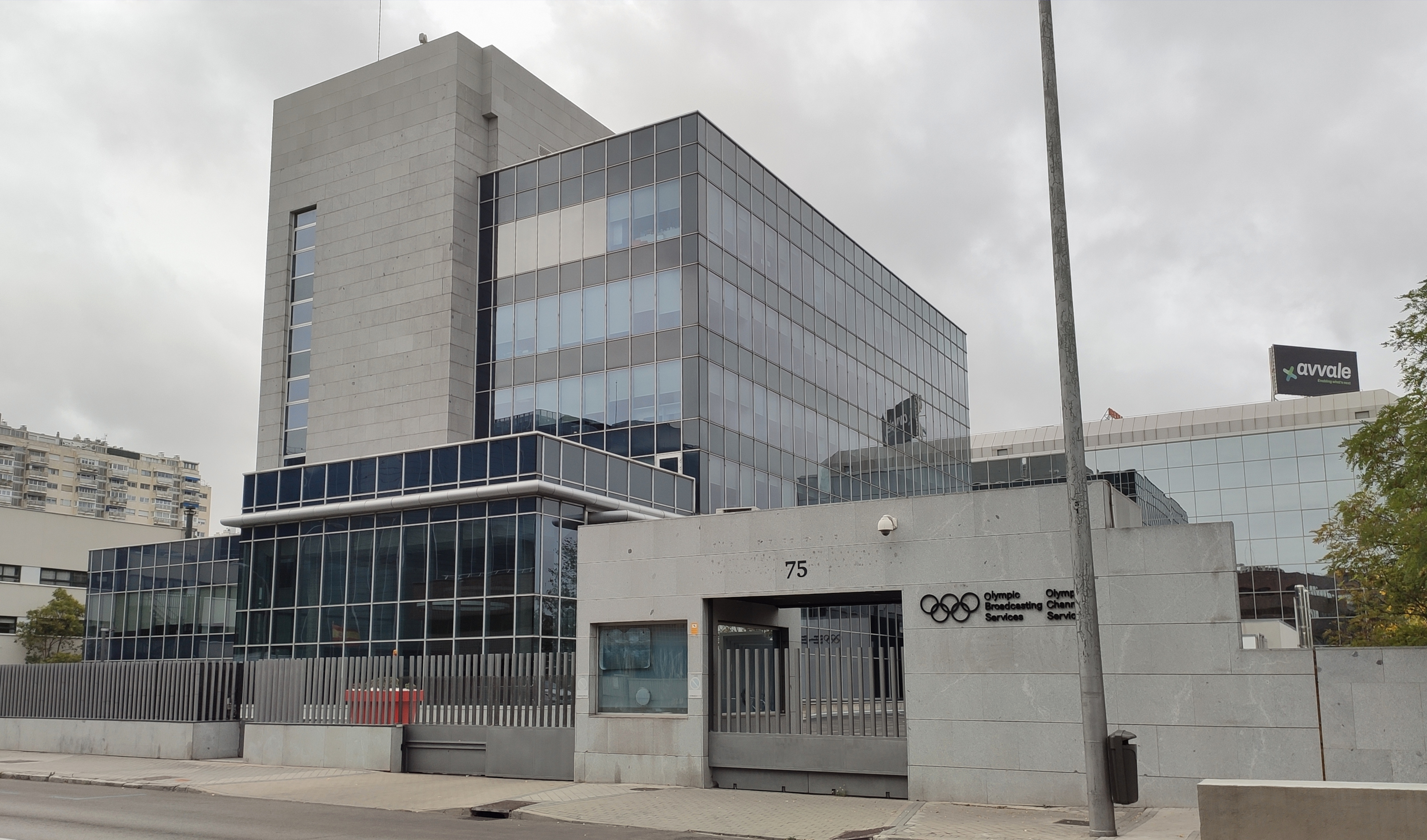
- Headquarters in 2024
- Abbreviation: OBS
- Formation: 2001; 25 years ago
- Purpose: Broadcasting
- Headquarters: Madrid, Spain
- Region served: Worldwide
- CEO: Yiannis Exarchos
- Parent organization: International Olympic Committee
- Staff: 160 (2025)
- Website: www.obs.tv

Olympic Broadcasting Services S.L. (OBS) is a limited liability company which was established by the International Olympic Committee (IOC) in 2001 in order to serve as the Host Broadcaster organisation for all Summer Olympic Games, Summer Paralympic Games, Winter Olympic Games, Winter Paralympic Games, Summer Youth Olympic Games and Winter Youth Olympic Games, maintaining the standards of Olympic broadcasting between each edition. Headquartered in Madrid, Spain, the company operates as a subsidiary of Olympic Broadcasting Services S.A. (Lausanne, Switzerland), which is owned by the International Olympic Committee through the Olympic Foundation.

== Functions ==
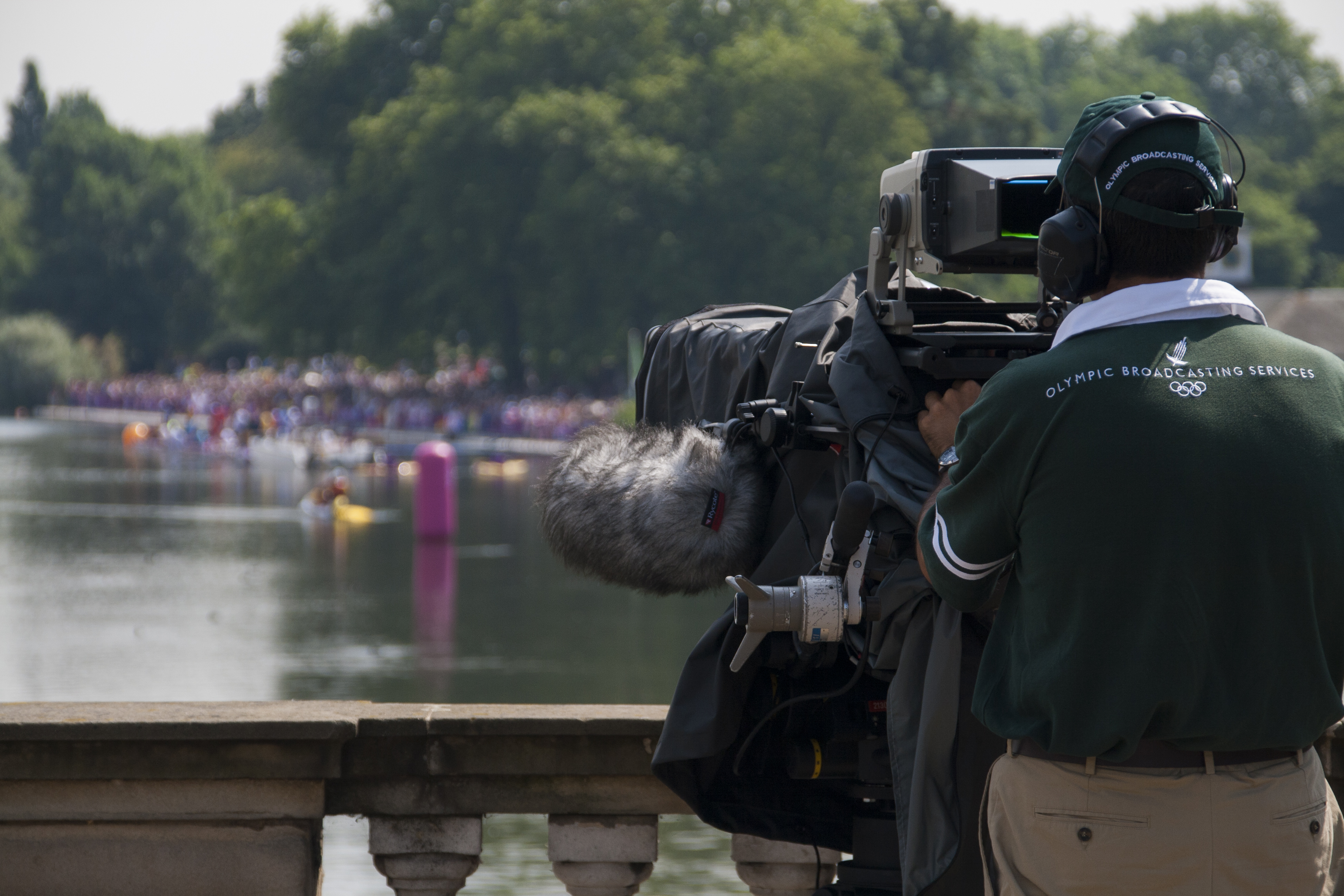
Olympic Broadcasting Services' cameraman, covering the men's 10 kilometre marathon swim at the 2012 Olympic Games.

As host broadcaster, OBS is responsible for delivering the pictures and sounds of the Olympic and Paralympic Games to billions of viewers around the world. It produces and transmits unbiased live radio and television coverage of every sport from every venue. This feed is called the International Signal, or the World Feed, and is distributed as a service to all broadcast organisations who have purchased the television and radio rights to the Games (known as Media Rights Holding Broadcasters or MRHs).

In collaboration with the Local Organising Committee, OBS supervises the development of the necessary infrastructure (particularly the International Broadcast Centre (IBC), which serves as the primary base of broadcast operations for OBS and the Media Rights Holders (MRHs) during the Games) and facilities at the various Olympic venues to ensure the successful broadcast production of the Games. OBS also offers additional services, equipment and supplies to the MRHs to assist their unilateral productions.

== History ==
The 2010 Winter Olympics in Vancouver marked the advent of OBS as host broadcaster. Previously that role was delegated to the local organising committees or even third-party broadcasters, a situation which necessitated a total rebuild of the omnibus broadcast operation each edition of the Games.

== OBS technology ==
For each edition of the Olympic Games, OBS has introduced new production technologies and methods aimed at improving broadcast efficiency, enhancing content delivery, and expanding access across platforms. These developments have supported MRHs in reaching wider audiences through both traditional and digital channels.

Notable innovations by Games edition include:

- Vancouver 2010: First Olympic Winter Games fully produced in high definition (HD) with 5.1 surround sound.
- London 2012: Introduced live 3D coverage and trialed 8K Super Hi-Vision (SHV).
- Sochi 2014: Digital coverage surpassed traditional TV for the first time. First use of drones and launch of the Olympic Video Player (OVP), for multi-platform live and on-demand access for MRHs.
- Rio 2016: Debut of virtual reality (VR) and 8K UHD-2 for select events. First fully tapeless Olympic Summer Games. Deployment of mini high-speed and point-of-view (POV) cameras.
- PyeongChang 2018: Launch of Content+, a cloud-based short-form content delivery platform for MRHs.
- Tokyo 2020: First Games produced in native UHD HDR with immersive 5.1.4 audio. Introduction of the Athlete Moment station, for live post-competition athlete-family interaction.
- Beijing 2022: First use of live 8K VR coverage. Full 5G network coverage at all venues.
- Paris 2024: Cloud-based live distribution used as a primary method. First live 8K streaming over the internet. Use of cinematic cameras and an augmented reality (AR) studio in the Olympic Village for live remote athlete interviews.
- Milano Cortina 2026: First use of first-person view drones during live event coverage.

== OBS operations by Olympic Games ==
=== Beijing 2008 ===
OBS's operations began with the Olympic Games Beijing 2008, where Beijing Olympic Broadcasting (BOB), a joint venture between OBS and the Beijing Organizing Committee for the Olympic Games, acted as the host broadcasting consortium (along with the state television network, China Central Television, which is one of the host nation broadcasters of the Olympic Games).

For the first time in history, an Olympic Games' edition took place in China and OBS provided a then-record more than 5000 hours of coverage, 32% more than for the Olympic Games Athens 2004.

The BOB team of more than 6000 professionals was the first Games to be covered fully in High Definition and 5.1 surround sound.

Beijing 2008 marked the introduction of the Olympic News Channel (ONC), a sports news programme made available to broadcasters. It consisted in regularly updated 30min program that ran around the clock offering the sports news, as well as other Olympic-related news stories.

=== Vancouver 2010 ===
For the Olympic Winter Games Vancouver 2010, a wholly owned division, Olympic Broadcasting Services Vancouver was established. These Games were the first in which the host broadcasting facilities were provided entirely by OBS. A total of 2700 hours of content were produced by OBS, a 170% increase from the Olympic Winter Games Turin 2006.

Following Beijing 2008, which coverage was fully in HD and 5.1 surround sound, Vancouver 2010 was the first Winter Games edition to offer the same for all events.

The Olympic News Channel (ONC), a round the clock sports news programme made available to broadcasters introduced at Beijing 2008, was reconducted and enhanced with additional content, in particular athletes’ interviews directly from the venues. MRHs were able to receive the ONC via satellite worldwide. The service comprised a number of other feeds including live finals and recorded content as well as selected competitions, two daily highlights programmes and the opening and closing ceremonies. This multichannel distribution helped bring Games coverage in areas where they were not traditionally broadcast and would be referred to as the Multichannel Distribution Service (MDS) in future Games.

=== London 2012 ===
For the first time, OBS served as the host broadcaster at an Olympic Summer Games. At London 2012, OBS produced 5,600 hours of coverage of which 1,300 hours were dedicated to live sports and ceremonies, across 30 competition venues. Over 1,000 HD cameras were deployed, including approximately 50 High Super Slow-Motion (HSSM) cameras, 3D cameras, and Super Hi-Vision (8K SHV) cameras, with SHV live coverage provided in collaboration with Japanese broadcaster NHK. At Eton Dorney, a 2,500 m cable camera was installed for the rowing events, offering sweeping 360-degree aerial views from up to 95 m above the water.

The International Broadcast Centre (IBC), located in the Olympic Park in Stratford, accommodated nearly 5,900 OBS personnel and hosted multiple public viewing areas for 3D and SHV coverage.

The Games reached 3.6 billion viewers globally and marked a major expansion of digital and multi-platform broadcasting, with audiences accessing content via TV, computers, tablets, and mobile devices.

=== Sochi 2014 ===
The Olympic Winter Games Sochi 2014 marked the beginning of the tenure of Yiannis Exarchos as the new CEO, who replaced the retired Manolo Romero. The Olympic Winter Games Sochi 2014 represented the largest broadcast operation in Olympic Winter Games up to that time. OBS deployed more than 450 cameras, including 12 cable camera systems, 31 High Speed Slow-Motion (HSSM) cameras and a drone used for the first time as part of the coverage of snowboard and freestyle skiing events, to ultimately produce 3100 hours of coverage, including 1300 hours of live sports and ceremonies coverage.

In total, 464 television channels broadcast Sochi 2014, almost double the number from Vancouver 2010, and more digital platforms offered coverage than at any previous Winter Olympic Games with 155 websites and 75 apps showing events live from Russia.

Due to the increased number of channels and digital platforms for Sochi 2014, there were more hours broadcast globally than any previous Winter Games with 114,367 hours broadcast around the world, compared to 56,902 hours at Vancouver 2010. For the first time in Olympic history, the amount of digital coverage exceeded traditional television broadcasts with 60,000 hours available on digital platforms, compared with 54,367 hours on television. The Olympic Winter Games Sochi 2014 were the first to be predominantly digital, with OBS contributing to the expansion of online coverage through the launch of the Olympic Video Player (OVP). Offered to MRHs on a subscription basis, the platform operated in 95 countries and combined live and on-demand coverage of competition sessions with news content and integrated data. The OVP also expanded the reach of the Winter Games into new territories, notably parts of sub-Saharan Africa, the Caribbean, and the Arab world.

=== Rio 2016 ===
For Rio 2016, OBS produced 7,100 hours of coverage, an increase of 27% compared to London 2012 (5,600 hours). Rio 2016 represented the most television coverage of any previous Olympic Games, with 275,301 total hours broadcast globally, far exceeding the 181,482 hours that were broadcast for the London 2012 Games. Additionally, coverage was aired across more platforms than ever before, as 584 television channels and 270 digital outlets conveyed the Olympic Games around the world.

The Olympic Video Player (OVP) was used for the first time in the Olympic Summer Games. The OVP broadcast the Games to 56 territories including highly populous areas such as India, Latin America and Thailand, providing live and on-demand HD video of all competition sessions as well as short-form highlights and real-time statistics with enhanced interactivity.

The digital broadcast hours of 161,847 exceeded the TV broadcast hours of 113,454. Compared to London 2012 the number of hours of digital coverage almost tripled (+198.6%).

In total, OBS deployed more than 1,000 cameras, including approximately 160 Super Slow Motion (SSM) and High Speed Slow Motion (HSSM) cameras. Additionally, drones were used for live coverage for the first time, covering sports such as Rowing and Canoe Sprint.

Rio also marked the first time Olympic content was available in Virtual Reality (VR). Overall, OBS produced more than 85 hours of live VR coverage, captured by custom-developed 360-degree camera systems, to a total of 14 RHB organisations, representing 31 territories and with total views topped 1.3 million. OBS provided VR coverage as Video On Demand (VOD) and highlights packages available for the opening and closing ceremonies, Beach Volleyball, Boxing, Fencing, Track and Field, Basketball, Diving and Artistic Gymnastics.

8K Super High Vision (16 times the resolution of High-Definition) was also used for the first time in Rio in collaboration with Japanese Rights Holder NHK. OBS-NHK distributed 8K and down-converted 4K (distributed with one-hour delay) to several RHBs that took the 8k/4k feeds. Approximately 100 hours of live coverage was produced including the opening and closing ceremonies and a selection of disciplines (Athletics, Basketball, Football, Judo, Swimming).

=== Pyeongchang 2018 ===
In cooperation with Intel, OBS utilised a VR platform that created a 360/180-degree virtual reality environment for viewers.

Certain sports events and the ceremonies were produced natively in Ultra High Definition (4K UHD), for the first time, providing participating subscribers with a pixel resolution four times that of High Definition (HD) – the current standard. Furthermore, other events were produced in 8K Super Hi-Vision (SHV) through partnership with Japan’s public service broadcaster, NHK. Up to 10 cameras, including 8K Super Slow Motion (SSM) cameras, were deployed for live production, twice the number used at Rio 2016.

The OBS Production Plan included more than 450 cameras to produce more than 5,400 hours of coverage, of which 867 hours were dedicated to live sports. OBS launched a new cloud-based content delivery platform known as Content+, allowing Rights-Holding Broadcasters to download more than 6,000 short form digital/social media clips.

=== Tokyo 2020 ===
The Olympic Games Tokyo 2020 proved to be unprecedented in Olympic history due to the COVID-19 pandemic. In March 2020, the decision was made to postpone the Games until the summer of 2021.

OBS partnered with Alibaba Group to create the OBS Cloud, a cloud-based broadcasting solution providing the connectivity, processing and storage needed to manage and deliver the large volumes of Olympic content. Built on Alibaba Cloud, it improved cost-efficiency and worldwide manageability, enabled faster deployment with fewer onsite resources, and allowed broadcasters to access, create and manage content remotely, including post-production, from any location with an internet connection.

With fans unable to attend the Tokyo 2020 Games, OBS provided an online ‘Cheer Map' and ‘Fan Video Wall’ that brought audiences virtual participation. Fans could access the Cheer Map and Fan Video Matrix feature via participating MRHs, as well as at the Tokyo 2020 section at the Olympics website. OBS also facilitated the ‘Athlete Moments’, allowing athletes at selected venues to connect with their family and friends directly after their event.

Tokyo 2020 would also be the first Games edition to be fully produced natively in UHD HDR.

By the close of the Games, Tokyo 2020 became the most watched Games on digital platforms to date, reflecting the continued growth of online viewership. While traditional television remained the dominant medium, accounting for 21.3 billion hours of coverage consumed, or 93% of all broadcast content, digital viewing saw significant gains. Compared to Rio 2016, Tokyo 2020 experienced a 74 % increase in unique digital viewers and a 139 % increase in the number of video viewers on digital platforms. This shift highlighted the evolving media landscape and let to Tokyo 2020 being referred to as the first “Streaming Games”.

=== Beijing 2022 ===
In total, OBS produced over 6,000 hours of coverage, including more than 1,000 hours of live sports and ceremonies coverage. The production involved the use of more than 660 cameras and 1,600+ microphones.

The Games attracted an estimated global audience of over two billion viewers, representing a 4.7% increase compared to the Olympic Winter Games PyeongChang 2018. Viewers consumed nearly 12 billion hours of content across both linear TV and digital platforms. While digital viewing saw substantial growth, with a 123.5% increase in digital viewership compared to 2018, linear TV remained the dominant medium, accounting for 92% of all broadcast hours consumed globally.

Beijing 2022 represented the first time that an Olympic Winter Games was natively produced in Ultra High Definition (UHD) High Dynamic Range (HDR) with 5.1.4 immersive audio.

In collaboration with Intel, OBS delivered live coverage in 8K Virtual Reality (VR) for the first time and launched a pilot project, a virtualised OB van that was used for the coverage of curling. Unlike traditional OB vans that rely on on-site hardware such as cameras, switchers, and control panels, Virtual OB vans use cloud-based, software-driven systems and Commercial Off-The-Shelf (COTS) solutions, enabling remote production. Also, 5G technology was used at full scale for live content transmission for the first time. Over 30 cameras, including mobile units at cross-country and Alpine Skiing, operated via 5G, enhancing camera flexibility and reducing the need for frequency coordination.

=== Paris 2024 ===
Paris 2024 were the first Olympic Games in which the Opening Ceremony was not held in a stadium, but along the River Seine. Some 85 boats carried nearly 7,000 athletes on a 6km floating parade on the Seine. The ceremony saw more than 300,000 people watching from along the high and low quays. OBS deployed more than 110 cameras, including robotic cameras, cranes and cable cameras, as well as four custom-made stabilised boats, three helicopters, and eight drones. This represents three times the number of cameras used at Tokyo 2020, where approximately 40 cameras were used for the opening ceremony. Additionally, 200 mobile phones were deployed on the boats of the different teams to cover the athletes as they float down the Seine. The OBS coverage on land, water and in the air, resulted in the largest single broadcast production for a sporting event in history.

In total, OBS produced more than 11,000 hours of coverage, including around 3,500 hours of live sports competition and ceremonies. This represents nearly double the number of hours produced only 12 years ago for London 2012. OBS also produced more overall content than ever before to date, including more athlete-centric coverage, including enhanced behind-the-scenes, interviews with coaches and athletes as well as pre/post-competition content.

The 2024 Olympics had UHD HDR visuals paired with 5.4.1 immersive sound. For the first time at an Olympic Games, OBS introduced cinematic cameras for the coverage. These cameras, characterised by a shallow depth of field, were used to create a more filmic visual style, bringing athletes and spectators into sharper focus and enhancing the overall visual experience for the viewer. The coverage featured AI-powered multi-camera replay systems, with the number of cameras doubling compared to Tokyo 2020. For aerial coverage, OBS deployed first-person-view (FPV) drones equipped with UHD HDR cameras.

The production also used augmented reality (AR) technology, enabling live interviews from the Olympic Village to be seamlessly integrated into mixed-reality studio environments. Dynamic graphics were used for the presentation of sports.

For the first time in Olympic broadcasting, the OBS Live Cloud served as the main method of distributing live signals, a shift towards cloud-based delivery.A virtualized OB van (VOB) was used to create a more sustainable broadcast production environment. Three VOBs were used for delivering live coverage in native UHD (4K) HDR for four sports: Shooting, Judo, Wrestling, and Tennis.

Artificial Intelligence (AI) was used in several new initiatives, including automated highlights generation in collaboration with TOP Partner Intel. Intelligent stroboscopic analysis, developed with TOP Partner Omega, studied movement and biomechanical positions in Diving, Athletics, and Artistic Gymnastics. Enhanced data graphics were used in Diving to analyze athlete body positions, while AI-driven technology measured serve reaction times in collaboration with Omega, providing data on the athlete's response to a serve.

== Paralympics ==
OBS has served as the host broadcaster for every Paralympic Games since the Olympic Winter Games Vancouver 2010, where it conducted its first fully independent host broadcast operation. In March 2018, the IOC and the IPC signed a long-term agreement that confirmed OBS as the official host broadcaster for all future editions of the Paralympic Games. As host broadcaster, OBS is responsible for delivering consistent and efficient broadcast coverage of the Paralympic Games.

According to the IPC, growing global interest from broadcasters, combined with the efforts of Organising Committees and the increasing quality and competitiveness of Paralympic sport, has contributed to the steady expansion of live event coverage. At the Rio 2016 Paralympic Games, 16 sports were broadcast live. This increased to 19 sports at Tokyo 2020, and by Paris 2024, all 22 sports received some level of live coverage for the first time in Paralympic history. For the Paralympic Games Paris 2024, OBS produced 1,450 hours of content. As stated by the IPC, total live television hours consumed increased by 83% compared to Tokyo 2020.

Paralympic Winter Games have also seen steady growth in broadcast coverage and audience reach. At Sochi 2014, more than 1,300 hours of coverage were broadcast across 125 channels in 55 countries, reaching a cumulative global audience of over 2 billion - an increase of 32% compared to Vancouver 2010. For PyeongChang 2018, although total viewership slightly declined, audiences outside the host country grew by more than 27%. The Winter Paralympic Games Beijing 2022 achieved a record cumulative audience of 2.1 billion, alongside over one billion video views on IPC digital channels and a 53% increase in social media followers.

OBS expanded its role at the Beijing Games by introducing several new services for MRHs. These included a daily one-hour highlights programme, Content+ (a web-based content portal), and the Paralympic Video Player (PVP) - marking the first time such digital tools were provided at a Paralympic Winter Games.

== Sustainability ==
Beginning in Rio 2016, OBS began offering MRHs six different modular structures for use in the fit-out to make the overall operation more sustainable, reducing the fit-out timelines significantly, by approximately a month and half (20 percent), and also helping to reduce the overall broadcast footprint. These structures which contain prefabricated panels could be used for multiple Games, eliminating 50,000 cubic metres of waste, the equivalent of almost 3,000 truckloads.

Following Pyeongchang 2018, previously used modular panels and containers were shipped to a refugee camp in Uganda where they were used to make much-needed housing. The work was financed by OBS in lieu of the costs of recycling those materials in Korea.

For the Paris IBC, OBS reused the prefabricated fit-out materials that were procured for the Beijing 2022 IBC with the reuse ratio at 90% for the modular panels.

At the venues, reductions in venue compound space required were down 11% from Tokyo, as well as broadcast power requirements reduced by 29% from Tokyo.

== Gender equality ==
As of May 2025, OBS permanent staff reached gender parity, comparing to a 80% male and 20% female ratio back in 2001 when OBS was founded. OBS has implemented various initiatives and training programmes aimed at advancing gender equality and creating professional development opportunities within the broadcast industry, particularly in host countries and underrepresented groups.

Broadcast Training Programme (BTP)

First introduced to the 1984 Summer Olympics, the Broadcast Training Programme (BTP) offers hands-on experience to university students in the host country. Participants receive technical training and contribute to broadcast operations during the Games. The programme is intended to support local students specialising in sports broadcasting and provide career pathways for young professionals. For Paris 2024, the programme was expanded to include retired or non-competing Olympians and Paralympians.

Framing the Future

Launched ahead of Paris 2024, Framing the Future is a training initiative aimed at increasing the number of females as camera operators. The programme offers targeted instruction and on-the-job experience, equipping participants with the skills required to work as camera operators during the Olympic Games.

Olympic Commentary Training

Also introduced before Paris 2024, the Olympic Commentary Training Programme seeks to involve more women and former athletes in live sports commentary. The initiative provides professional training in broadcast commentary and aims to diversify the voices represented in Olympic coverage.

Engineering the Future

To address gender disparities in technical broadcasting roles, OBS launched the Engineering the Future internship in 2024. The 24-week programme targets women studying broadcast engineering and related disciplines, providing practical experience in planning and preparing for Olympic broadcast operations. Interns also have the opportunity to work on-site during the Milano Cortina 2026 Olympic Winter Games.

Olympic Media Innovators Programme

Introduced in 2025 by OBS in collaboration with Olympic Channel Services (OCS), this programme supports young women aged 18–21 seeking careers in sports media. It combines online learning with an immersive experience at the OBS/OCS headquarters in Madrid, covering aspects of media production, mentorship, and professional networking.

== Previous logos ==
2010 logo

2014 logo
