= 2008 Summer Olympics closing ceremony =

- Part of 2008 Summer Olympics
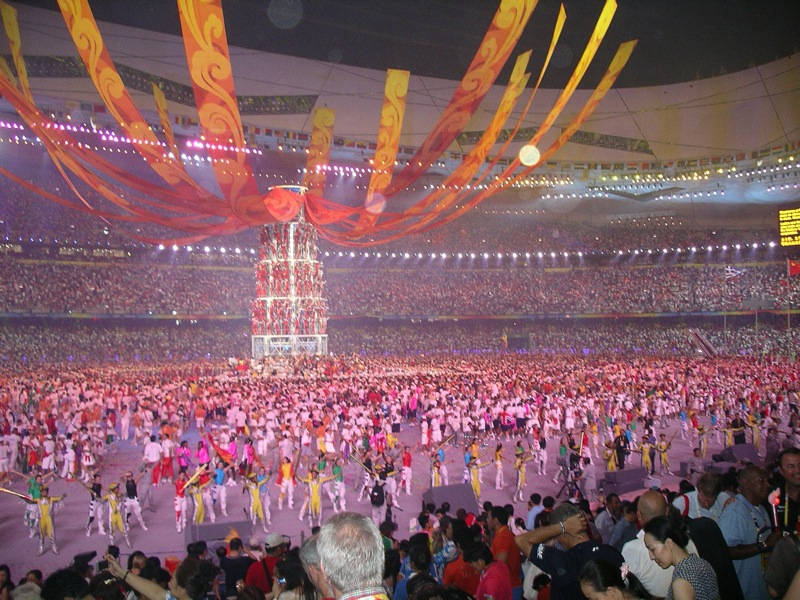
- The Memory torch section after the cauldron was extinguished
- Date: 24 August 2008
- Time: 20:00 – 21:55 CST (UTC+08:00)
- Venue: Beijing National Stadium
- Location: Beijing, China; 39°59′30″N 116°23′26″E
- Filmed by: Beijing Olympic Broadcasting (BOB)
- Footage: Full closing ceremony on the IOC YouTube channel on YouTube

The 2008 Summer Olympics closing ceremony was held at the Beijing National Stadium, also known as the Bird's Nest. The ceremony was directed by Chinese filmmaker Zhang Yimou and began at 20:00 China Standard Time (UTC+8) on Sunday night, 24 August 2008. The number 8 is associated with prosperity and confidence in Chinese culture.

The musical acts included

- Plácido Domingo and Song Zuying singing The Flame of Love (lyrics by writers Song Xiaoming and Yuan Yuan)
- Wei Wei and Sun Nan singing Beijing Beijing (wo ai Beijing).
- Leona Lewis, Jimmy Page (with David Beckham making an appearance), Elspeth Hanson as the violinist and Kwesi Edman as the cellist.
- Andy Lau, Emil Chau, Jackie Chan, Karen Mok, Kelly Chen, Joey Yung and Nicolas Tse.
- Wang Lee Hom, Stefanie Sun and Rain.
- Han Hong
- Klaus Badelt wrote the music for the closing ceremonies.

The ceremony also included the handover of the games from Beijing to London. Guo Jinlong, the Mayor of Beijing, handed over the Olympic flag to the Mayor of London, Boris Johnson. There was also a performance organized by the London Organising Committee for the Olympic Games (LOCOG).

While the opening ceremony was described as an artistic and serious introduction of China's ancient past, the closing ceremony was described by Western media as "much more lighthearted", "silly," and "fun" than the opening ceremony.

By the end of the 16 days of NBC's coverage of the Beijing Olympics in the United States, it had also become the most-watched U.S. television event of all time, with over 211 million American viewers tuned into the Olympics on NBC according to the Nielsen Media Research; this is 2 million more than the 1996 Atlanta Games, the previous all-time record-holder.

== Sequence of events ==
=== Opening and a Homenage to Beijing ===
Sequence

- People's Liberation Army Navy Band performance Welcome March song and Introduction of IOC members and China's leader Hu Jintao.
- Fireworks prelude, including a firework countdown above the National Stadium itself at 20:00 CST.
- The Flag of China was raised, to the Chinese national anthem, March of the Volunteers.
- Mass games performance by a troupe of 200 drummers.
- Orange sparkling fireworks.
- Performers in translucent costumes, bocking stilts and some riding on illuminated monowheels.

Synopsis

Chinese leader Hu Jintao entered the stadium, accompanied by Jacques Rogge. They were followed by the entrance of British Prime Minister Gordon Brown and his wife, Sarah. The countdown started from "29", indicating the 29th Summer Olympics. From "29" to "11", highlights of the Olympic Games were shown with countdown numbers on the screen. Accompanied by sound effects, the atmosphere reached its countdown to number digital millennium terminator. Guided by volunteers, the entire audience counted down from 10 together for 10 seconds to starting at 19:59:50 China Standard Time in the country and the sky above the stadium is the same as the countdown started in a unison voice "10" to "1" with all voice screaming as "10, 9, 8, 7, 6, 5, 4, 3, 2, 1" or "Shi!!!, Jiu!!!, Ba!!!, Qi!!!, Liu!!!, Wu!!!, Si!!!, San!!! Er!!!, Yi!!!" is used to release large-scale fireworks above the stadium to the Games and herald the start of the officially opening time at 20:00:00 China Standard Time with the fireworks burst immediately when the countdown ended, forming a great circle in the sky which symbolized the success of the Beijing Olympic Games. The starting countdown is the same used during the opening ceremony 16 days earlier by 2,008 PLA members. The PLAGF Honor Guard Soldiers prepared the national flag of China. The soldiers then carried the flag, in a slow, goose-stepping march, to the flagpole and the Chinese national anthem, the March of the Volunteers, was sung by a 224-member choir while the flag was unfurled and raised.

All lights were extinguished in the stadium. A video was played on the large screen in the north and south to explain the theme of the closing ceremony. The video reviewed the exciting and memorable moments during the 2008 Summer Olympic Games. A grand celebration began:

1. Two hundred performers in drum formation lined up, in a circle, on the steps of the Main Stage. They danced and beat drums while looking up at the sky. Two large heavenly drums flew from the north and south, and the resonant sound of the drum seemed to come from far away.
2. The performers beat the heavenly drums in a unique style in magical light. The two heavenly drums met at the center above the stadium, slowly falling down to the Main Stage and were suspended about 5 meters above the stage. The heavenly drum and the drum on the ground complemented each other.
3. Summoned by the drumbeat, 1,148 silver bell dancers wearing silver bells gathered around the Main Stage, and sang and danced for the heavenly drums. The grand celebration was near to begin.

Next, silver bell performers danced in time to the beat of the heavenly drums on the Main Stage to greet the guests.

1. Eight drum carts in different shapes entered the stadium, carrying performers who beat drums in unique ways. The sound of the song was mingled with the drumbeat; passionate and dynamic.
2. Eight rotating poles swung and crossed.
3. With 60 light wheels shuttling, 200 bouncing and flying men ran and did somersaults.
4. The silver bell dancers changed into radiating wave lines coming through, and formed four festive passages with the eight drum carts to great the guests.

=== Attending heads of state and dignitaries ===
The closing ceremony was attended by at least 30 heads of state and dozens of other dignitaries. Notable faces included:

International organizations:

- Secretary-General of the United Nations Ban Ki-moon
- Secretary-General of ASEAN Surin Pitsuwan
- IOC President Jacques Rogge and wife Anne Rogge, predecessor Juan Antonio Samaranch and Members of the International Olympic Committee

Host nation:

- (China) Chinese President and General Secretary of the Communist Party Hu Jintao and wife Liu Yongqing, former Chinese leader Jiang Zemin and wife Wang Yeping, Premier Wen Jiabao and wife Zhang Peili, former Premiers Li Peng and Zhu Rongji, Chairman of the National People's Congress Wu Bangguo, Vice President Xi Jinping, Vice Premier Li Keqiang, Foreign Minister Yang Jiechi, BOCOC President and Party Committee Secretary of Beijing Liu Qi, and Mayor of Beijing Guo Jinlong

Foreign dignitaries:

- Prime Minister of the United Kingdom Gordon Brown and wife Sarah Jane Brown, Princess Anne, and Mayor of London Boris Johnson as the main authorities of the next host city.
- Prime Minister of Finland Matti Vanhanen
- (Sweden) King Carl XVI Gustaf and Queen Silvia
- (Belgium) King Albert II
- Prime Minister of Malaysia and President of the United Malays National Organisation Abdullah Ahmad Badawi, sultan Mizan Zainal Abidin of Terengganu
- President of the United States George W. Bush, Secretary of State Condoleezza Rice, Members of the Presidential Delegation: Secretary of Labor Elaine Chao, Secretary of Health and Human Services Michael O. Leavitt, United States Ambassador to China Clark T. Randt Jr., Global Vice Chair of Burson-Marsteller Karen Hughes, President of the United States Olympic Committee Peter Ueberroth, Figure Skating Champion and American Public Diplomacy Envoy Michelle Kwan, Governor of New York David Paterson, Mayor of New York City Michael Bloomberg, and President of Manhattan Scott Stringer
- (Germany) German President Horst Köhler
- Prime Minister of South Korea Han Seung-soo
- Prime Minister of Australia Kevin Rudd
- President of Singapore S. R. Nathan
- Chief Executive of Hong Kong Donald Tsang
- Prince of Monaco Albert II
- President of Iran Mahmood Ahmadinejad
- Chief Executive of Macau Edmund Ho
- Vice President of Indonesia Jusuf Kalla

=== Entrance of the flag bearers ===
Sequence

- Flag bearers enter the stadium.
- Athletes enter the stadium.
- Athletes gather in the stadium, with drumming throughout the precession.

Synopsis

Led by guides and placard holders, the flag bearers of all delegations entered the stadium, divided into two groups. One group (1–102), headed by Greece as per tradition, entered from Gate 4 in alphabetical order and stood along the main stage. The other group (103–204), headed by Saudi Arabia, entered from Gate 3 and also stood along the main stage. The Chinese Flag bearer entered last and stood at the designated place. Greece entering first and China entering last symbolizing the first and the most recent Summer Olympics host nations.

After all flags were in position, the athletes entered the stadium in no particular order. All athletes entered from four gates without differentiation of nationality. While the athletes were entering, a women's percussion band and two children percussion players played cheerful music. The entire stadium was in raptures.

Finally, the medal-winning athletes entered the stadium.

=== Men's Marathon Medal ceremony ===
Sequence

- Presentation of the final men's marathon medals; including the national anthem of Kenya: Ee Mungu Nguvu Yetu, for the gold medallist Samuel Wanjiru.
- Presentation of the volunteer thanksgiving ceremony of bouquets of flowers to twelve volunteer representatives of the over 70,000 volunteers of the games, conducted by newly elected athlete representatives to the IOC Athletes' Commission: Moon Dae-sung of South Korea, Alexander Popov of Russia, Claudia Bokel of Germany and Yumilka Ruiz of Cuba.

Synopsis

At this point, Samuel Wanjiru received his gold medal. He was very excited as he climbed to the first position. Three flags, including the flag of Kenya, were raised as the national anthem of Kenya was played.

Afterwards, twelve children led twelve representatives of volunteers to walk from Gate 2 to the stage. Then, four children led four new members of IOC Athletes' Commission (Moon Dae-Sung of South Korea, Alexander Popov of Russia, Claudia Bokel of Germany and Yumilka Ruiz Luaces of Cuba) to walk together with four people for the ceremony from Gate 1 to the Main Stage.

The final medalists are listed below:

- (Kenya) Samuel Wanjiru - Gold
- (Morocco) Jaouad Gharib - Silver
- (Ethiopia) Tsegaye Kebede - Bronze

=== The Antwerp Ceremony ===
Sequence

- Raising of the Greek national flag, to the national anthem of Greece as "Hymn to Liberty".
- Welcoming of Liu Qi, the president of the BOCOG, and Jacques Rogge, the IOC President.
- Speech by Liu Qi in Mandarin Chinese, concluding by thanking everyone.
- Speech by the IOC President, Jacques Rogge, in English, French and concluding in Mandarin, declaring the Beijing Games "truly exceptional". He closes the Games, and bids (in French) for "the youth of the world to assemble four years from now in London".
- The flag of the United Kingdom was raised to the British national anthem God Save the Queen.
- Lowering of the Olympic flag and singing of the Olympic Anthem which the Chinese and foreign singers sung in Greek.
- Fireworks representing the Olympic rings.
- The PLAGF Honor Guard Soldiers folding of the Olympic flag as the soldiers exited
- Returning of the Olympic flag by Guo Jinlong, the Mayor of Beijing, to Jacques Rogge, in turn presenting it to Boris Johnson, the Mayor of London. Each of the three waves the flag a customary six times

Synopsis

The People's Liberation Army then enter the stadium, holding the national flag of Greece. While the Greek flag was being hoisted, the Greek national anthem "Hymn to Liberty" was performed.

Rogge and Liu Qi walked to the main stage from the VIP corridor. During his speech, Rogge praised the Chinese for their warm reception and effort. He also stated that the Beijing Games were "truly exceptional". Finally, he declared in French that the 2008 Olympic Games were officially closed.

"God Save the Queen"
(Closing Ceremony)

God save our gracious Queen!
Long live our noble Queen!
God save the Queen!
Send her victorious,
Happy and glorious,
Long to reign over us:
God save the Queen!

Not in this land alone,
But be God's mercies known
From shore to shore:
Lord make the nations see
That men should brothers be,
And form one family
The wide world o'er.

The British flag was then raised and the British national anthem God Save the Queen was played. Shortly thereafter, the soldiers slowly lowered the Olympic flag and Chinese and foreign child singers sung the Olympic anthem in Greek. Afterwards, the PLA soldiers folded the Olympic flag and exited.

The Olympic flag was handed from Guo Jinlong, the mayor of Beijing, to Count Rogge, the president of the IOC. It was then handed to Boris Johnson, the mayor of London. The Olympic flag was next raised again in Vancouver, British Columbia, Canada, during the 2010 Winter Olympics opening ceremony on February 12, 2010.

=== From London, "With a whole Lotta love." ===
Sequence

- Eight minutes of presentation of the 2012 London Olympics.
  - A British modern cultural performance, involving a double-decker bus, bicycles and commuters, to a score entitled 'This is London' by Philip Sheppard recorded by the London Symphony Orchestra.
  - Ten-year-old Tayyiba Dudhwala steps out of the double decker bus in front of the crowd and receives a ball from Erika Tham, then walks onto people to return to the bus.
  - Leona Lewis and Jimmy Page perform "Whole Lotta Love".
  - Appearance by David Beckham. Beckham kicked a ceremonial football into the rows of volunteers.

Synopsis

A demonstration entitled "From London, 'With a whole Lotta love." was then staged by the British. It featured the urban dance group ZooNation, the Royal Ballet, and Candoco, a disabled dance group, all dressed as typical London commuters waiting for a bus by a zebra crossing, whilst Olympic Champions Chris Hoy, Victoria Pendleton and Jamie Staff cycled around the stadium. A double-decker bus drove around the stadium to the music 'This is London', composed by Philip Sheppard and recorded by the London Symphony Orchestra, before eventually stopping and transforming into a privet hedge featuring famous London landmarks such as Tower Bridge, The Gherkin and the London Eye. Jimmy Page and Leona Lewis then performed the Led Zeppelin classic Whole Lotta Love and David Beckham kicked a football into the crowd of athletes, accompanied by violinist Elspeth Hanson and cellist Kwesi Edman. Page recalled:

"Doing the Olympics with Leona Lewis was phenomenal. She's really plucky, she's superb, and she sang 'Whole Lotta Love' brilliantly. We managed to do the full-length of 'Whole Lotta Love' – it wasn't edited – and she sang it beautifully. It was so cool, the way she approached it. For that audience, and the fact we didn't fuck it up… 'We're really going to do this and we're going to do it proud.' That was important. It was a Led Zeppelin number but it took on another persona. I was proud to be able to play that riff for the handover."

=== The Games End ===
Sequence

- Procession of performers on an airport terminal staircase, with events during the 2008 Summer Olympics on-screen.
- The Olympic Flame was then extinguished, following a recitation from an ancient Greek poem in which the Games duration is exhausted.

An airport electronic flight screen appeared on the large screen of the Stadium. An athlete about to leave walked up the boarding ladder and turned around affectionately. In special-effect lighting, the boarding ladder truck with the logo of Beijing 2008 Summer Olympic Games was slowly elevated. He slowly took out an exquisite painting scroll and unfolded it. In the dark, a huge mechanic device — the landmarks including the Statue of Liberty in New York City, the Eiffel Tower in Paris, the Colosseum in Rome and Big Ben in London at the center of the field — rose slowly, with two "sports sculpture" performers standing on top of it and showing various athletic gestures.

The rim of the bowl changed into a red track. Special lights cast scenes of the games from the opening ceremony to now onto the track in the air. At the center of the field, two "sports sculpture" performers rise gradually and show different athletic gestures slowly in the air, conveying the noble Olympic spirit. The athlete on the boarding ladder looks at the burning flame in the distance, and slowly folds the painting scroll, just as the flame was about to be extinguished. Landmark including the Statue of Liberty in New York City, the Eiffel Tower in Paris, the Colosseum in Rome and Big Ben in London as the Olympic flame took its final breath.

=== Final last closing events ===
Sequence

- Performers on a Landmark, including the Statue of Liberty in New York City, the Eiffel Tower in Paris, the Colosseum in Rome, and Big Ben in London, waving arms and symbolizing the Olympic flame, eternally not extinguished. Performers group to form Landmark, with hurdle runners on top of the Landmark, including the Statue of Liberty in New York City, the Eiffel Tower in Paris, the Colosseum in Rome, and Big Ben in London. Performers then re-climb the landmark, which is then covered in huge New York City. Landmarks are formed along with athletes below (with pillar as a stigma), the athlete crowds as petals. New York City is levitated upward and reveals the performers arranged in the form of Dancing Beijing, the 2008 Olympic logo.
- Fireworks.
- Song "Beijing Beijing, I Love Beijing" (Běijīng Běijīng, Wǒ Ài Běijīng) by Chinese singer Tan Jing, Hong Kong singer Kelly Chen, Han Xue, Taiwanese-American singer Wang Lee Hom, and Korean singer Rain. Erhu instrumental; acrobats leap from the tower by wire.
- Song The Moon is Bright Tonight.
- Song The Flame of Love.
- Song Surpass It
- Final last closing ended song Please stay, Guests from afar with all full firework displays.

Final last closing synopsis

The torch lights in the hands of the marshals and the 90,000 audience members were turned on at the same time. Accompanied by music, 16 lucky cloud yarn strips on the main stage featured landmarks including the Statue of Liberty in New York City, the Eiffel Tower in Paris, the Colosseum in Rome and Big Ben in London. The tops of the strips then extended upwards and formed a lucky cloud tree, intended to symbolize friendship and joy.

The concert section started. Tan Jing, Kelly Chen and Han Xue, Wang Lee Hom and Rain sang together the song "Beijing, Beijing, I Love Beijing", a song about Beijing.

Next, seven singers walked from below the steps to the Main Stage and sang "The Moon is Bright Tonight". Two Chinese and foreign singers on the mobile singing performance car went from Gate 1 to the front of the VIP corridor, and sang "The Flame of Love". Two singers on the main stage sang the joyous and passionate song "Surpass It".

At this point, there were 50 young singers together. At the same time, 75 aerobatic performers wearing luminous flight clothes performed elevation and rotation in the air.

The final performance ended with a closing farewell musical song "Please stay, Guests from afar", 50 male dancers holding Fuwa lucky cloud yarn strips and paper flower launchers and 120 other dancers danced on the Main Stage in tune with the rhythm of the song. Also, 600 female performers in festival clothes entered the stadium, flew around the athletes and danced with all athletes in the stadium and 1,046 marshals in tune with the rhythm of the song, forming a spectacular dance circle.

Performers threw Fuwa's lucky cloud yarn strips into the stadium, interacting with the athletes to fireworks at closing ceremony "sign-off". At the same time, innumerable fireworks were launched from the top of the "Beijing National Stadium". All full festival fireworks formed a huge circle of extravaganza all full fireworks were fired in a one-off event from all Beijing launching from the top of the building outwards above the many spectators and well wishers below farewell in the year in which Beijing went on to host the 2008 Beijing Olympic Games say farewell. All full fireworks were launched in the shape and colour of the see you 2012 London Olympic Games in a display that all full minutes compared to being reduced to all full minutes along with 2008 Summer Paralympics closing ceremony symbolizing the successful back to home at closedown of 2008 Summer Olympics. The closing ceremony ended at 21:55 CST because after closing ceremony ended due to all full firework displays.

== Television ==
Estimates of the global television audience varied: "around one billion" (Reuters), "experts estimated ... more than two billion" (The Wall Street Journal), "2.3 billion" (MindShare), "Billions...probably the largest live television audience in history" (Bloomberg), "3 billion" (Sky News), "nearly 4 billion" (Xinhua), "as many as 4 billion" (The Washington Post), "estimated 4 billion" (McClatchy). This included an estimated 842 million viewers watching on host Chinese broadcaster China Central Television (CCTV), with polls ranging from 63 to 69% of the Chinese viewing population, exceeding that of the 51-58% who watch the network's annual closing ceremonies forms.

== Anthems ==
- A choir of 224 singers from 56 ethnic groups of China - National Anthem of China
- National Anthem of Greece
- (United Kingdom) National Anthem of Great Britain
- (International Olympic Committee) A choir of multinational children - Olympic Hymn

=== Victory ceremony ===
- National Anthem of Kenya (Note: Anthem played as part of the Men's marathon victory ceremony.)

== See also ==
- 2008 Summer Olympics opening ceremony
