= 2008 Summer Paralympics =

Multi-parasport event in Beijing, China

XIII Paralympic Games
- Location: Beijing, China
- Motto: One World, One Dream (Chinese: 同一个世界 同一个梦想 pinyin: Tóng yīge shìjìe tóng yīge mèngxiǎng)
- Nations: 146
- Athletes: 3,952
- Events: 472 in 20 sports
- Opening: 6 September 2008
- Closing: 17 September 2008
- Opened by: Hu Jintao; President of China
- Closed by: Philip Craven; President of the International Paralympic Committee
- Cauldron: Hou Bin
- Stadium: Beijing National Stadium

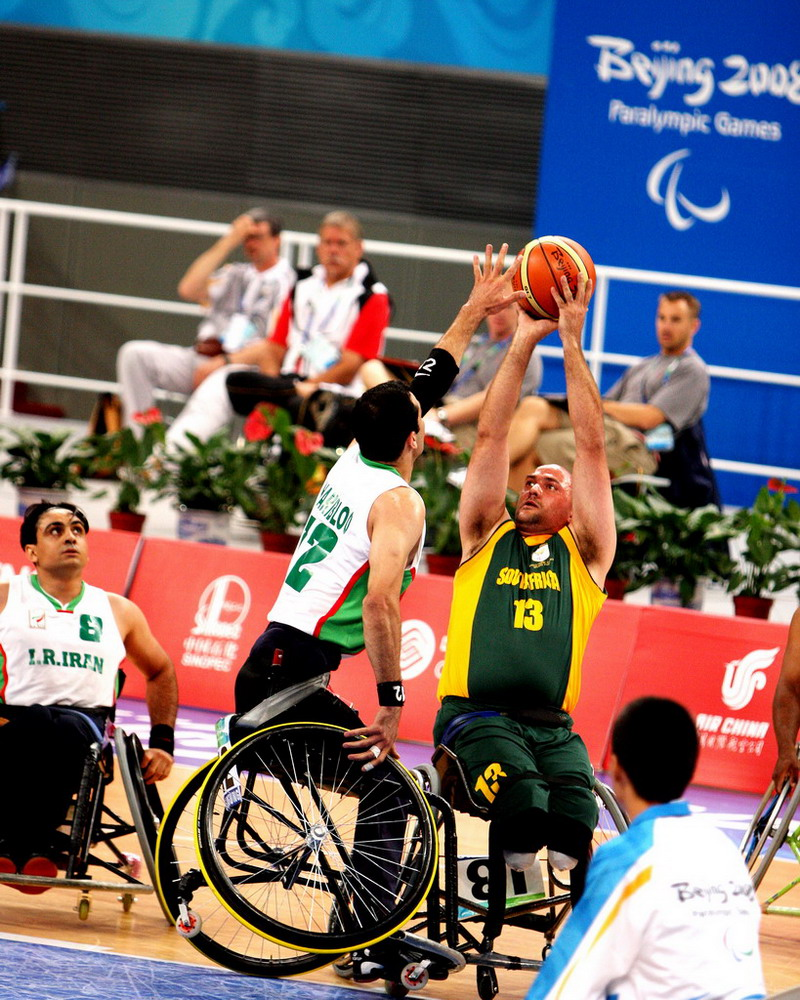
Iran v South Africa in wheelchair basketball at the 2008 Summer Paralympics.

The 2008 Summer Paralympic Games (Chinese: 2008年夏季残疾人奥林匹克运动会; pinyin: 2008 Nián Xiàjì Cánjí Rén Àolínpǐkè Yùndònghuì), the 13th Summer Paralympic Games, took place in Beijing, China, from September 6 to 17, 2008. As with the 2008 Summer Olympics, equestrian events were held in Hong Kong and sailing events in Qingdao. It was first time the new Paralympic logo featured in the Summer Paralympics since its rebranding after the 2004 Summer Paralympics. The Paralympics (both Summer and Winter) held in Beijing is the first and only to be held with spectators, as the 2022 Winter Paralympics in Beijing held without spectators due to the COVID-19 pandemic.

3,951 athletes from 146 countries took part, the largest number of nations ever (ten more than the 2004 Games in Athens). Five countries competed for the first time. As host country, China fielded more athletes than any other country. The slogan for the 2008 Paralympics was the same as the 2008 Summer Olympics, "One World, One Dream" (simplified Chinese: 同一个世界 同一个梦想; traditional Chinese: 同一個世界 同一個夢想 Pinyin Tóng yīge shìjìe tóng yīge mèngxiǎng, lit. "One World, One Dream"). China dominated the medal count, finishing with 89 gold medals and 211 total medals, more than double the next-ranked NPC in both cases. 339 Paralympic records and 279 world records were broken. International Paralympic Committee (IPC) President Philip Craven declared the Games "the greatest Paralympic Games ever."

Beijing was selected to host the 2022 Winter Paralympics, making it the first city to host both Summer and Winter Games.

== Venues ==
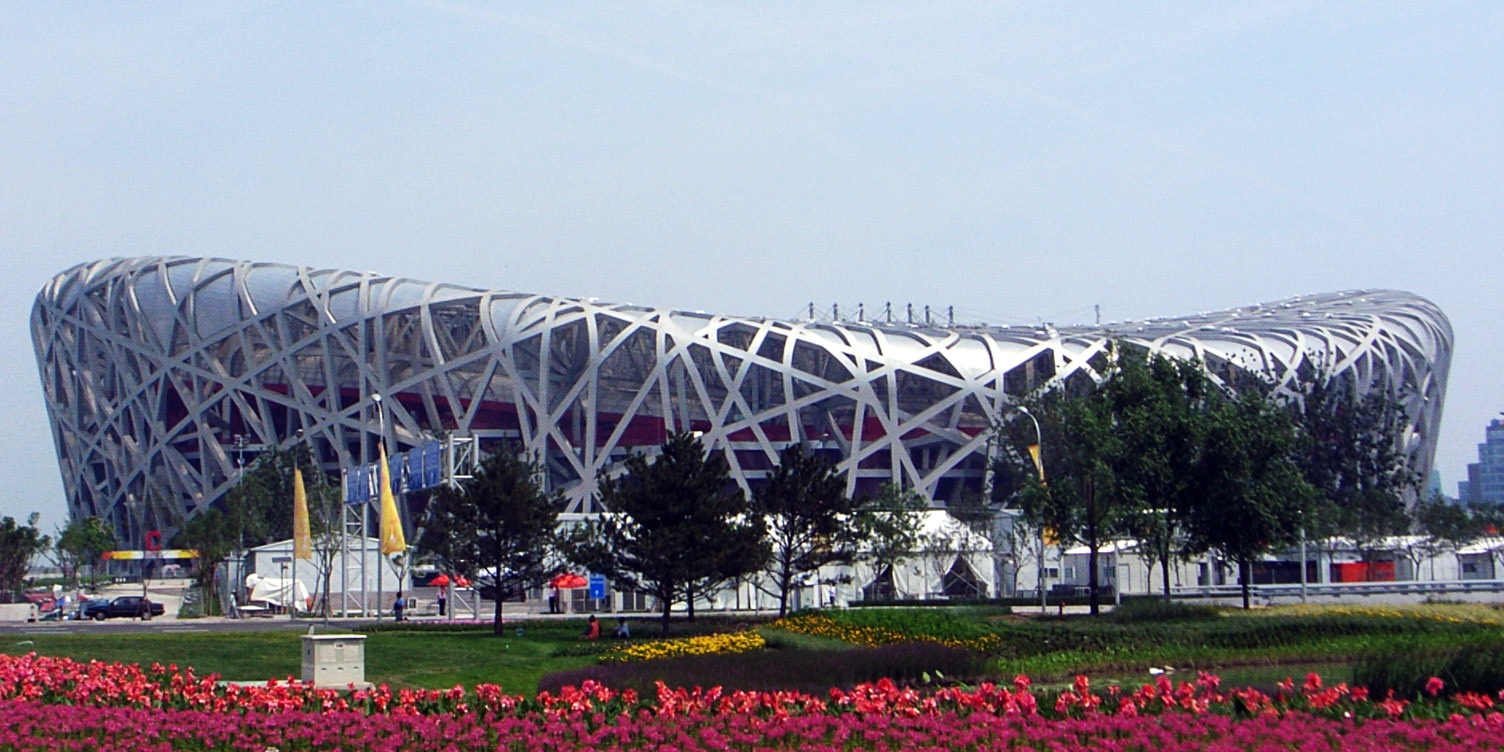
The Beijing National Stadium

Nineteen competition venues were selected—seventeen in Beijing, one in Hong Kong, and one in Qingdao.

1. Beijing National Stadium (Bird Nest) - Athletics, opening and closing ceremonies
2. Beijing National Aquatics Center (Water Cube) - Swimming
3. Beijing National Indoor Stadium (Fan) - Wheelchair basketball
4. Fencing Gymnasium of Olympic Green Convention Centre - Boccia, Wheelchair fencing
5. Olympic Green Archery Field - Archery
6. Olympic Green Hockey Field - Football 5-a-side, Football 7-a-side
7. Olympic Green Tennis Centre (Flowers) - Wheelchair tennis
8. Peking University Gymnasium - Table tennis
9. Beihang University Gymnasium - Powerlifting
10. China Agricultural University Gymnasium - Sitting volleyball
11. Beijing Science and Technology University Gymnasium - Wheelchair rugby
12. Beijing Institute of Technology Gymnasium - Goalball
13. Beijing Shooting Range Hall - Shooting
14. Laoshan Velodrome - Cycling (track)
15. Workers Gymnasium - Judo
16. Shunyi Olympic Rowing-Canoeing Park - Rowing
17. Triathlon Venue - Cycling (road)
18. Hong Kong Equestrian Venues - Equestrian
19. Qingdao International Sailing Centre - Sailing

== Symbols ==
=== Emblem ===
The Games's emblem, "Sky, Earth, and Human Beings" (Chinese: 天、地、人), was unveiled in July 2004, a multicolored Chinese character "之" (Chinese: zhī) stylized as an athletic figure in motion. Its red, blue and green colors represent sun, sky and earth.

=== Slogan ===
The slogan was the same as the 2008 Summer Olympics, "One World, One Dream".

Fu Niu Lele, mascot of the 2008 Summer Paralympics

=== Mascots ===
The mascot was a cartoon cow named Fu Niu Lele (Chinese: 福牛乐乐), roughly meaning "Lucky Ox 'Happy'".

=== Theme song ===
The theme song was "Flying with the Dream" Chinese: 和梦一起飞. It was performed by Chinese-Tibetan singer Han Hong and Hong Kong singer and actor Andy Lau.

== Torch relay ==
The torch relay of the 2008 Summer Paralympics started from Tian Tan (Temple of Heaven) on August 28. The flame then gathered before The Hall of Prayer for Good Harvests (祈年殿) and followed two routes (the "Route of Ancient China" and the "Route of Modern China"). Both routes returned to Beijing on September 5, and the torch was flamed at the National Stadium during the opening ceremony on September 6.

== The Games ==
=== Opening ceremony ===
The opening ceremony took place on September 6, 2008. The pre-ceremony performance was a succession of various musical performances, ranging from military music to folk music and a performance of Ode to Joy. Following a countdown, a fireworks display signalled the beginning of the ceremony proper. The national flag of China was then raised, in accordance with usual protocol, and the national anthem of China performed. Performers wearing suits in bright colours paraded round the stadium, as a welcoming ceremony preceding the athletes' entry. As with the 2008 Summer Olympics, the ceremony included a parade of nations, with a flag bearer for each national team. Contrary to Olympic tradition, the national team of Greece did not enter first, as the Paralympic Games traces its roots to Stoke Mandeville rather than Olympia; the host country, as is customary in both Olympic and Paralympic Games, came last. As Chinese is written in characters and not letters, the order of the teams' entry was determined by the number of strokes in the first character of their respective countries' Simplified Chinese names. Countries with the same number of strokes in the first character are sorted by those of the next character. This made Guinea (几内亚) the first country to enter as it takes two strokes to write the first character in the country's name (几). Following the athletes' parade, a performance took place, divided into chapters and sub-chapters entitled the "Journey of Space" and "Journey of Life". The sunbird performance entailed Yang Haitao (杨海涛), a singer with a visual impairment, singing about dreams while an acrobat in sunbird costume descended in simulated flight from the air and "awakened the blind singer from his sleep". The ceremony concludes with Hou Bin, the first Chinese paralympian to be three-time champion consecutively in the same event, lifted himself and his wheelchair up on a rope by strength of arms to the top of Beijing National Stadium, where he lit the cauldron to mark the beginning of the Games.

=== Closing ceremony ===
The 2008 Summer Paralympics closing ceremony was held at the Beijing National Stadium. It began at 8:00 pm China Standard Time (UTC+8) on September 17, 2008.

=== Sports ===
The programme of the 2008 Summer Paralympics featured events in 20 sports. The number of events in each sport is noted in parentheses.

- Archery (9)
- Athletics (160)
- Boccia (7)
- Paralympic cycling
  - Road (30)
  - Track (13)
- Equestrian (11)
- Football 5-a-side (1)
- Football 7-a-side (1)
- Goalball (2)
- Judo (13)
- Powerlifting (20)
- Rowing (4)
- Sailing (3)
- Shooting (12)
- Swimming (140)
- Table tennis (24)
- Volleyball (2)
- Wheelchair basketball (2)
- Wheelchair fencing (10)
- Wheelchair rugby (1)
- Wheelchair tennis (6)

Rowing made its first appearance in the Paralympics at these games.

=== Calendar ===
●	Opening ceremony	●	Event competitions	●	Gold medal events	●	Closing ceremony

September		6th Sat	7th Sun	8th Mon	9th Tue	10th Wed	11th Thu	12th Fri	13th Sat	14th Sun	15th Mon	16th Tue	17th Wed	Events
Ceremonies		OC											CC	—N/a
Archery					●	●	●	●	4	3	2			9
Athletics				10	20	17	10	16	20	18	19	25	5	160
Boccia			●	●	4	●	●	3						7
Cycling	Road cycling							15	4	4				46
Cycling	Track cycling		5	7	7	4								46
Equestrian			●	2	4	2	3							11
Football	5-a-side		●		●		●		●		●		1	1
Football	7-a-side			●		●		●		●		1		1
Goalball			●	●	●	●	●	●	●	2				2
Judo			4	4	5									13
Powerlifting					3	4	2		3	4	2	2		20
Rowing					●	●	4							4
Sailing				●	●	●	●	●	3					3
Shooting			2	2	2	2	2	2						12
Swimming			16	18	16	12	13	16	14	18	17			140
Table tennis			●	●	●	5	11	●	●	●	4	4		24
Volleyball			●	●	●	●	●	●	●	1	1			2
Wheelchair basketball			●	●	●	●	●	●	●	●	1	1		2
Wheelchair fencing										3	3	2	2	10
Wheelchair rugby								●	●	●	●	1		1
Wheelchair tennis				●	●	●	●	●	1	3	2			6
Daily medal events			27	41	61	46	45	52	49	56	51	36	8	472
Cumulative total			27	68	129	175	220	272	321	377	428	464	472	472
September		6th Sat	7th Sun	8th Mon	9th Tue	10th Wed	11th Thu	12th Fri	13th Sat	14th Sun	15th Mon	16th Tue	17th Wed	Events

=== Participating NPCs ===
The following National Paralympic Committees sent delegations to compete. Macau and the Faroe Islands are members of the International Paralympic Committee, but not of the International Olympic Committee; hence they participate in the Paralympic Games but not in the Olympics.

Burundi, Gabon, Georgia, Haiti, Montenegro and Serbia participated in the Paralympics for the first time.

Botswana was due to take part, but its single athlete, defending Paralympic champion sprinter Tshotlego Morama, withdrew prior to the Games due to injury. The country's last-minute attempt to field other athletes in her place was rejected, as they did not meet the requirement of having participated in international events.

Participating National Paralympic Committees
- Afghanistan
- Algeria
- Angola
- Argentina
- Armenia
- Australia
- Austria
- Azerbaijan
- Bahrain
- Bangladesh
- Barbados
- Belarus
- Belgium
- Benin
- Bermuda
- Bosnia and Herzegovina
- Brazil
- Bulgaria
- Burkina Faso
- Burundi
- Cambodia
- Canada
- Cape Verde
- Central African Republic
- Chile
- China (host)
- Colombia
- Costa Rica
- Ivory Coast
- Croatia
- Cuba
- Cyprus
- Czech Republic
- Denmark
- Dominican Republic
- Ecuador
- Egypt
- El Salvador
- Estonia
- Ethiopia
- Faroe Islands
- Fiji
- Finland
- France
- Gabon
- Georgia
- Germany
- Ghana
- Great Britain
- Greece
- Guatemala
- Guinea
- Haiti
- Honduras
- Hong Kong
- Hungary
- Iceland
- India
- Indonesia
- Iran
- Iraq
- Ireland
- Israel
- Italy
- Jamaica
- Japan
- Jordan
- Kazakhstan
- Kenya
- Kuwait
- Kyrgyzstan
- Laos
- Latvia
- Lebanon
- Lesotho
- Libya
- Lithuania
- Luxembourg
- Macau
- Macedonia
- Madagascar
- Malaysia
- Mali
- Malta
- Mauritius
- Mexico
- Moldova
- Mongolia
- Montenegro
- Morocco
- Myanmar
- Namibia
- Nepal
- Netherlands
- New Zealand
- Niger
- Nigeria
- Norway
- Oman
- Pakistan
- Palestine
- Panama
- Papua New Guinea
- Peru
- Philippines
- Poland
- Portugal
- Puerto Rico
- Qatar
- Romania
- Russia
- Rwanda
- Samoa
- Saudi Arabia
- Senegal
- Serbia
- Singapore
- Slovakia
- Slovenia
- South Africa
- South Korea
- Spain
- Sri Lanka
- Suriname
- Sweden
- Switzerland
- Syria
- Chinese Taipei
- Tajikistan
- Tanzania
- Thailand
- Timor-Leste
- Tonga
- Tunisia
- Turkey
- Turkmenistan
- Uganda
- Ukraine
- United Arab Emirates
- United States
- Uruguay
- Uzbekistan
- Vanuatu
- Venezuela
- Vietnam
- Zambia
- Zimbabwe

== Medal count ==
This table is based on the medal count of the International Paralympic Committee (IPC).

The ranking is sorted primarily by the number of gold medals earned by a National Paralympic Committee. The number of silver medals is taken into consideration next and then the number of bronze medals. If countries are still tied, equal ranking is given and they are listed alphabetically by IPC Country Code.

* Host nation (Host nation (China))

2008 Summer Paralympics medal table
Rank	NPC	Gold	Silver	Bronze	Total
1	China (CHN)*	89	70	52	211
2	Great Britain (GBR)	42	29	31	102
3	United States (USA)	36	35	28	99
4	Ukraine (UKR)	24	18	32	74
5	Australia (AUS)	23	29	27	79
6	South Africa (RSA)	21	3	6	30
7	Canada (CAN)	19	10	21	50
8	Russia (RUS)	18	23	22	63
9	Brazil (BRA)	16	14	17	47
10	Spain (ESP)	15	21	22	58
11–76	Remaining NPCs	170	219	229	618
Totals (76 entries)		473	471	487	1,431

== International television ==
- Australia – ABC1 and ABC2.
- Brazil – SporTV2 and Terra Networks.
- Canada – Canadian Broadcasting Corporation (CBC) in English and Société Radio Canada (SRC) in French.
- China – Chinese Central Television (CCTV) provided coverage on CCTV-1 (opening and closing ceremony), CCTV-5 and CCTV-7 as all direct live telecast transmission.
- France – Eurosport
- Japan – NHK's NHK General TV provided coverage on JOAK-1
- Azerbaijan – AZTV
- Norway – NRK
- Sweden – Sveriges Television
- Turkey – TRT
- United States – Universal Sports
- United Kingdom – BBC provided coverage on BBC Television's BBC One.
- Cambodia- National Television of Cambodia

In France, following the Games, Philippe Juvin, national secretary of the governing Union for a Popular Movement, accused national public television network France Télévisions of having practiced "segregation" by providing live coverage of the Beijing Olympics but only ten-minute daily summaries of events, outside prime time, for the Beijing Paralympics. France Télévisions replied that it would take Juvin to court for slander.

== See also ==
- 2007 Summer Special Olympics
- 2008 Summer Olympics
- 2009 Summer Deaflympics
- 2022 Winter Paralympics

== Notes ==
Preceded by Athens	Summer Paralympics; Beijing; XIII Paralympic Summer Games (2008)	Succeeded by London
