= Beijing Olympic Broadcasting =

Chinese broadcasting consortium

Beijing Olympic Broadcasting Co., Ltd (BOB) (Chinese: 北京奥林匹克转播有限公司; pinyin: Běijīng àolínpǐkè zhuǎnbò yǒuxiàn gōngsī) was a Chinese broadcasting consortium which produced the main international feeds for the 2008 Summer Olympics and Paralympics. It was established in 2004 as a joint venture between the Beijing Organizing Committee for the Olympic Games and Olympic Broadcasting Services, owned by the International Olympic Committee, in such a way as to conform to Chinese laws against direct foreign investment in Chinese television.

== History ==
- May 27, 2004, Agreement Sign up of Funding BOB. BOB was put into track of establishment legally.
- Oct. 27, 2004, the first Board Meeting of Bob was held and BOB began its startup
- Nov 1, 2004, BOB began steering on.
- May 31, 2005, BOB launches officially to the public.
- May 31, 2005, 2nd board meeting was held.
- Sept 21–23, 2005 world broadcaster briefing held in Beijing.
- Sept 21, 2005 BOB signed MOU with China TV Production for Beijing Olympic Games.
- Sept 21, 2005 BOB signed MOU with China Netcom for Beijing Olympic Games.

== Management team ==
Name	Department	Title
Manolo Romero	Executive Management	CEO
Ma Guoli	Executive Management	COO
Yiannis Exarchos	Executive Management	SEO
Stefanos Kourelas	Finance, Human Resources and Administration	Head
Yosuke Fujiwara	Broadcast Relations	Head
Maria Golfinopoulou	Broadcast Relation	Deputy Head
Bob Kemp	Production	Head
Bai Li	Production	Deputy Head
Mike Klatt	Production	Deputy Head
Sotiris Salamouris	Engineering & Operations	Head
Caroline Ramsay	Broadcast Services	Head
Mary Alexopoulos	Broadcast Services	Deputy Head
Andrew Lu	Logistics	Head
Thom Curran	Logistics	Deputy Head
Yu Zhen	Information	Director
Aristeidis Nikoloudis	Planning	Director
Steve Li	Planning	Deputy Director
Irene Chan	Human Resources	Director

== See also ==
- List of 2008 Summer Olympics broadcasters
