= List of sports federations and associations in China =

This is a list of official sports governing bodies, federations and associations in China. All governing bodies are led by or under supervision of General Administration of Sports of China (or All-China Sports Federation).

== Organizations ==
Organization	Acronym	Sport	Olympic listed	Established	President (birthyear)	Website
Chinese Archery Association	CAA	Archery	✓	1964	Liang Chun	http://www.archerysport.org.cn
Chinese Athletics Association	CAA	Athletics	✓	1954	Duan Shijie (1952)	http://www.athletics.org.cn/
Chinese Badminton Association	CBA	Badminton	✓	1958	Zhang Jun (1977)	http://www.cba.org.cn/
Chinese Baseball Association	CBA	Baseball	✓	1979	Chen Xu	http://baseball.sport.org.cn/
Chinese Basketball Association	CBA	Basketball	✓	1956	Yao Ming (1980)	http://www.cba.net.cn/
Chinese Boxing Federation	CBF	Boxing	✓	1986	Zhang Chuanliang (1953)	http://boxing.sport.org.cn/
Chinese Canoe Association	CCA	Canoe	✓	1981	Liu Aijie	http://www.chncanoe.cn/
Chinese Cycling Association	CCA	Cycling	✓	1959	Shen Jinkang	http://cycling.sport.org.cn/
Chinese Diving Association	CDA	Diving	✓	2020	Zhou Jihong (1965)	
Chinese Equestrian Association	CEA	Equestrian	✓	1979	Zhang Xiaoning	http://equestrian.sport.org.cn/
Chinese Fencing Association	CFA	Fencing	✓	1973	Wang Haibin (1975)	http://fencing.sport.org.cn/
Chinese Figure Skating Association	CFSA	Figure skating	✓	2018	Shen Xue (1978)	http://www.cfsa.com.cn/
Chinese Football Association	CFA	Football	✓	1955	Chen Xuyuan (1956)	http://www.thecfa.cn/
Chinese Golf Association	CGA	Golf	✓	1985	Zhang Xiaoning	http://www.cgagolf.org.cn/
Chinese Gymnastics Association	CGA	Gymnastics	✓	1954	Miao Zhongyi	http://gymnastics.sport.org.cn/
Chinese Handball Association	CHA	Handball	✓	1979	Wang Tao	http://handball.sport.org.cn/
Chinese Hockey Association	CHA	Hockey	✓	1981		http://hockey.sport.org.cn/
Chinese Ice Hockey Association	CIHA	Ice hockey	✓	1981	Cao Weidong (1968)	http://icehockey.sport.org.cn/
Chinese Judo Association	CJA	Judo	✓	1979	Xian Dongmei (1975)	http://judo.sport.org.cn/
Chinese Modern Pentathlon Association	CJA	Modern pentathlon	✓	1984	Fang Ya	http://modernpentathlon.sport.org.cn/
Chinese Rowing Association	CRA	Rowing	✓	1981	Liu Aijie	http://www.rowing.org.cn/
Chinese Rugby Football Association	CRFA	Rugby football	✓	2010	Chen Yingbiao	http://rugby.sport.org.cn/
Chinese Shooting Association	CSA	Shooting	✓	1956	Liang Chun	http://www.shooting.org.cn/
Chinese Skating Association	CSA	Speed skating	✓	1956	Li Yan (1968)	http://skating.sport.org.cn/
Chinese Ski Association	CSA	Skiing	✓	1984	Duan Shijie (1952)	http://www.skiing.org.cn/
Chinese Softball Association	CSA	Softball	✓	1979	Chen Xu	http://softball.sport.org.cn/
Chinese Swimming Association	CSA	Swimming	✓	1956	Zhou Jihong (1965)	http://swimming.sport.org.cn/
Chinese Table Tennis Association	CTTA	Table tennis	✓	1955	Liu Guoliang (1976)	http://www.ctta.cn/
Chinese Taekwondo Association	CTA	Taekwondo	✓	2004	Guan Jianmin (1963)	http://www.taekwondo.org.cn/
Chinese Tennis Association	CTA	Tennis	✓	1953		http://tennis.sport.org.cn/
Chinese Triathlon Sports Association	CTSA	Triathlon	✓	1990	Zhang Jian (1964)	http://triathlon.sport.org.cn/
Chinese Volleyball Association	CVA	Volleyball	✓	1953	Yuan Weimin (1939)	http://www.volleychina.org/
Chinese Weightlifting Association	CWA	Weightlifting	✓	1956	Zhou Jinqiang (1964)	http://www.cwa.org.cn/
Chinese Wrestling Association	CWA	Wrestling	✓	1953	Zhang Xia (1968)	http://wrestling.sport.org.cn/
Chinese Yachting Association	CYA	Sailing	✓	1991	Zhang Xiaodong (1964)	http://www.chinasailing.org.cn/about
