= List of current leaders of the Chinese Olympic Committee =

This article lists the current leaders of the Chinese Olympic Committee.

== Leadership ==
Office	Name	Notes
President	Gou Zhongwen	Minister of the State General Administration of Sports; Former Deputy Party Secretary of Beijing (2013-2016)
Honorary President	Liu Peng	Deputy Chairman of the Foreign Affairs Committee of the Chinese People's Political Consultative Conference; Former President of the Chinese Olympic Committee (2005-2016); Former Minister of the State General Administration of Sports (2004-2016)
Vice Presidents	Yang Shu'an	Vice Minister of the State General Administration of Sports
Vice Presidents	Zhao Yong	Vice Minister of the State General Administration of Sports; Former Deputy Party Secretary of Hebei (2011-2016)
Vice Presidents	Cai Zhenhua	Vice Minister of the State General Administration of Sports; Former professional table tennis player (1978-1985)
Vice Presidents	Gao Zhidan	Vice Minister of the State General Administration of Sports
Vice Presidents	Li Yingchuan	Vice Minister of the State General Administration of Sports; Former Director of Beijing Municipal Bureau of Sports (2010-2015)
Vice Presidents	Duan Shijie	Former Vice Minister of the State General Administration of Sports (1999-2013)
Vice Presidents	Yu Zaiqing	Vice President of the International Olympic Committee; Former Vice Minister of the State General Administration of Sports (1999-2011)
Vice Presidents	Feng Jianzhong	Former Vice Minister of the State General Administration of Sports (2005-2016)
Vice Presidents	Li Lingwei	Associate Counsel of the International Cooperation Department of the State General Administration of Sports; Member of the International Olympic Committee; Former professional badminton player (1980-1989)
Secretary General	Song Luzeng	Director General of the External Affairs Department of the State General Administration of Sports; Vice President and Chairman of the Sports Committee of the Olympic Council of Asia
Deputy Secretaries General	Ni Huizhong	Director General of the General Office of the State General Administration of Sports
Deputy Secretaries General	Liu Guoyong	Director General of the Sport for All Department of the State General Administration of Sports
Deputy Secretaries General	Cai Jiadong	Director General of the Competition and Training Department of the State General Administration of Sports
Deputy Secretaries General	Liu Fumin	Director General of the Youth Sport Department of the State General Administration of Sports
Deputy Secretaries General	Wang Weidong	Director General of the Finance Department of the State General Administration of Sports
Deputy Secretaries General	Guo Jianjun	Director General of the Personnel Department of the State General Administration of Sports
Deputy Secretaries General	Zhang Xiaoning	Director General of the Science and Education Department of the State General Administration of Sports
Deputy Secretaries General	Tu Xiaodong	Director General of the Press and Publicity Department of the State General Administration of Sports
Deputy Secretaries General	Zhu Guoping	Executive Deputy Secretary of the MWR Committee of the State General Administration of Sports
Deputy Secretaries General	Zhao Changling	Director General of the Bureau of Retired Cadres of the State General Administration of Sports
Deputy Secretaries General	Song Keqin	Deputy Director General of the External Affairs Department of the State General Administration of Sports
Deputy Secretaries General	Wei Daishun	Deputy Director General of the External Affairs Department of the State General Administration of Sports
Executive Members	Zhu Ling	Deputy Chairwoman of the Culture, Sports and Health Committee of the Sichuan Provincial Committee of the Chinese People's Political Consultative Conference; Former Director of Sichuan Provincial Bureau of Sports (2004-2016); Former professional volleyball player (1979-1984)
Executive Members	Yang Yang (A)	Member of the International Olympic Committee; Vice Chairman of the All-China Youth Federation; Former professional short-track speek skater (1999-2006)
Executive Members	Zhang Hong	Acting professional speed skater
Executive Members	Wu Minxia	Former professional diver (1998-2016)
Executive Members	Wu Jingyu	Acting professional taekwondo player
Members	Ren Hongguo	Party Secretary of the Management Center of Winter Sports of the State General Administration of Sports
Members	Zeng Zhigang	Head of the Management Center of Shooting of the State General Administration of Sports
Members	Wang Wei	Head of the Management Center of Cycling/Fencing of the State General Administration of Sports
Members	Li Quanhai	Head of the Management Center of Water Sports of the State General Administration of Sports
Members	Zhou Jinqiang	Head of the Management Center of Weightlifting/Wrestling/Judo of the State General Administration of Sports
Members	Li Qiang	Head of the Management Center of Boxing/Taekwondo of the State General Administration of Sports
Members	Du Zhaocai	Head of the Management Center of Athletics of the State General Administration of Sports
Members	Wang Lusheng	Party Secretary of the Internal Services Center of the State General Administration of Sports
Members	Luo Chaoyi	Head of the Management Center of Gymnastics of the State General Administration of Sports
Members	Lei Jun	Head of the Management Center of Handball/Hockey/Baseball/Softball of the State General Administration of Sports
Members	Xin Lancheng	Former Head of the Management Center of Basketball of the State General Administration of Sports (2009-2017)
Members	Liu Xiaonong	Director General of the Competition and Training Department of the State General Administration of Sports
Members	Wang Liwei	Head of the Management Center of Small Ball Sports of the State General Administration of Sports
Members	Zhang Chi	Head of the Management Center of Finance of the State General Administration of Sports
Members	Zhang Qiuping	Head of the Management Center of Wushu of the State General Administration of Sports
Members	Xu Li	Former Head of the Management Center of Volleyball of the State General Administration of Sports (1997-2013)
Members	Chu Bo	Director General of the Policy and Law Department of the State General Administration of Sports
Members	Guo Hongfeng	President of Qingdao Navigation School of the State General Administration of Sports
Members	Zhang Liang	Head of the Sports Science Research Institute of the State General Administration of Sports
Members	Xie Minhao	Head of National Institute of Sports Medicine of the State General Administration of Sports
Members	Tian Ye	Head of the Sport Culture Developing Center of the State General Administration of Sports
Members	Chi Jian	President of Beijing Sports University
Members	Ding Dong	Head of the Sport Information Center of the State General Administration of Sports
Members	Huang Linghai	Head of the International Sport Coorperation [sic?] Center of the State General Administration of Sports
Members	Li Hua	Head of the Equipment Center of the State General Administration of Sports
Members	Sun Xuecai	Director of Beijing Municipal Bureau of Sports
Members	Zhang Xin	Deputy Director of Chongqing Municipal Bureau of Sports
Members	He Jianghai	Director of Hebei Provincial Bureau of Sports
Members	Su Yajun	Director of Shandong Provincial Bureau of Sports
Members	Tan Jingfeng	Director of Inner Mongolia AR Bureau of Sports
Members	Song Kai	Director of Liaoning Provincial Bureau of Sports
Members	Wang Chengsheng	Director of Jilin Provincial Bureau of Sports
Members	Yang Tao	Director of Heilongjiang Provincial Bureau of Sports
Members	Huang Yongping	Party Secretary of Shanghai Municipal Bureau of Sports
Members	Chen Gang	Director of Jiangsu Provincial Bureau of Sports
Members	Sun Guangming	Director of Zhejiang Provincial Bureau of Sports
Members	Gao Weiling	Director of Anhui Provincial Bureau of Sports
Members	Wang Weichuan	Director of Fujian Provincial Bureau of Sports
Members	Yan Juteng	Director of Jiangxi Provincial Bureau of Sports
Members	Zhang Songlin	Deputy Chairman of the Culture, Sports and Health Committee of the Shandong Provincial Committee of the Chinese People's Political Consultative Conference; Former Director of Shandong Provincial Bureau of Sports (2013-2017)
Members	Zhang Wenshen	Party Secretary of Jiaozuo, Henan; Former Director of Henan Provincial Bureau of Sports (2015-2016)
Members	Zhang Jiasheng	Director of Hubei Provincial Bureau of Sports
Members	Li Shun	Director of Hunan Provincial Bureau of Sports
Members	Wang Yuping	Director of Guangdong Provincial Bureau of Sports
Members	Li Ze	Director of Guangxi AR Bureau of Sports
Members	Ding Hui	Director of Hainan Provincial Bureau of Culture, Radio, Film, Television, Publication and Sports
Members	Xin Shijie	Director of Chongqing Municipal Bureau of Sports
Members	Zhang Yuguang	Director of Guizhou Provincial Bureau of Sports
Members	He Chikang	Director of Yunnan Provincial Bureau of Sports
Members	Nima Tsering	Captain of Tibet hiking team
Members	Dong Li	Deputy Director of Shaanxi Provincial Bureau of Sports
Members	Yang Wei	Director of Gansu Provincial Bureau of Sports
Members	Zhang Ning	Former professional badminton player (1991-2008)
Members	Zhang Baisen	Director of Ningxia AR Bureau of Sports
Members	Nie Chun	Director of Xinjiang AR Bureau of Sports
Members	Ma Kaiping	Director General of the Training Bureau of the Training and Administration Department of the Central Military Commission
Members	Jiang Xiusheng	Deputy Director of the Publicity Bureau of the Political Work Department of the Central Military Commission
Members	Lei Sheng	Acting professional fencing player
Members	Yao Ming	Chairman of Chinese Basketball Association; Former professional basketball player (1998-2011)
Members	Zou Kai	Former professional artistic player (2002-2016)
Members	Wang Yifu	Deputy manager & Head coach of China national shooting team Former professional shooting player (1979-2005)
Members	Zhao Hongbo	Head coach of Chinese national figure-skating team Former professional figure-skating player (1992-2010)
Members	Liu Guoliang	Head coach & men's team coach of China national table tennis team Former professional table tennis player (1991-2003)
Members	Ma Wenguang	Former Party Secretary of the Management Center of Boxing/Taekwondo of the State General Administration of Sports (2013-2017); Former professional weightlifting player (1975-1987)
Members	Liu Baoli	Deputy Director General of the International Cooperation Department of the State General Administration of Sports
Members	Ma Jilong	Former Head of the Equipment Center of the State General Administration of Sports
Members	Li Guoping	Former Head of National Institute of Sports Medicine of the State General Administration of Sports

== Advisory group ==
Office	Name	Event	Notes	Took office
Director	Cai Zhenhua	Table tennis	National team player (1978-1985); National men's team head coach (1989-2000); National team head coach (1997-2005); Vice Minister of the State General Administration of Sports (2007-present)	April 2017
Exe. Deputy Director	Cai Jiadong		Director General of the Competition and Training Department of the State General Administration of Sports (2009-present)	April 2017
Members	Wang Yifu	Shooting	National team athlete (1979-2004); National team head coach (2004-present)	April 2017
Members	Huang Yubin	Artistic gymnastics	National team athlete (1975-1984); National team coach (1985-1992); National team deputy head coach (1992-1997); National team head coach (1997-2017)	April 2017
Members	Li Yongbo	Badminton	National team player (1980s-1992); National team deputy head coach/head coach (1992-2017)	April 2017
Members	Feng Shuyong	Athletics	Provincial team athlete (1973-1977); National team coach (1982-2002); National team head coach (2003-2017)	April 2017
