= He Zhenliang =

Chinese politician (1929–2015)

Vice-President of the International Olympic Committee
- In office 1989–1993
- President: Juan Antonio Samaranch

President of the Chinese Olympic Committee
- In office 1989–1994
- Preceded by: Li Menghua
- Succeeded by: Wu Shaozu

Personal details
- Born: 29 December 1929 Wuxi, Jiangsu, China
- Died: 4 January 2015 (aged 85) Beijing, China
- Party: Chinese Communist Party
- Spouse: Liang Lijuan
- Children: 2
- Education: Aurora University
- Occupation: sports administrator

He Zhenliang (Chinese: 何振梁; 29 December 1929 – 4 January 2015) was a Chinese politician and diplomat. He served as vice-president of the International Olympic Committee, the chairman of the International Olympic Committee's Culture and Olympic Education Commission, the president of the Chinese Olympic Committee and an executive of the Organizing Committee for the 2008 Summer Olympics.

He was born in Wuxi in Jiangsu Province, but his father's family came from Shangyu in Zhejiang Province. In 1938 he and his families moved into the Shanghai French Concession where he attended a school run by French Jesuits. In 1946–1950 he studied electric mechanics at the Aurora University in Shanghai. Upon graduation in 1950, he worked for the Foreign Liaison Department of the central committee of the Communist Youth League of China. In 1952, he attended the 1952 Summer Olympics in Helsinki, Finland as a member of the Chinese sports delegation. In 1955, he was reassigned to the National Sports Commission of the PRC (now the State General Administration of Sports of the PRC). In 1964, he became the deputy secretary general of the Chinese Gymnastics Association, later served as the secretary general of the Chinese Table Tennis Association and the head of the secretariat of the All-China Sports Federation. In 1979, he was promoted to the deputy secretary general of the All-China Sports Federation and the Chinese Olympic Committee (COC). He served as the secretary general of COC between 1982 and 1986, vice president between 1986 and 1989, and the president of COC between 1989 and 1994.

He was elected to the International Olympic Committee (IOC) in 1981. In 1985, he was elected to the executive board of IOC, and subsequently served three 5-year terms (1985–1989, 1994–1998, 1999–2003). He was elected the vice-president of the IOC in 1989, and served one term (1989–1993) and became an honorary member in 2010.

He joined the Chinese Communist Party in 1954. In 1988, he served as a delegate to the Chinese People's Political Consultative Conference (CPPCC). In 1993, he was appointed to the standing committee of CPPCC and the vice commissioner of Physical Education and Sport of CPPCC.

He Zhenliang died on 4 January 2015 aged 85.
