= Beijing Organizing Committee for the Olympic Games =

2008 Olympics local organizing committee

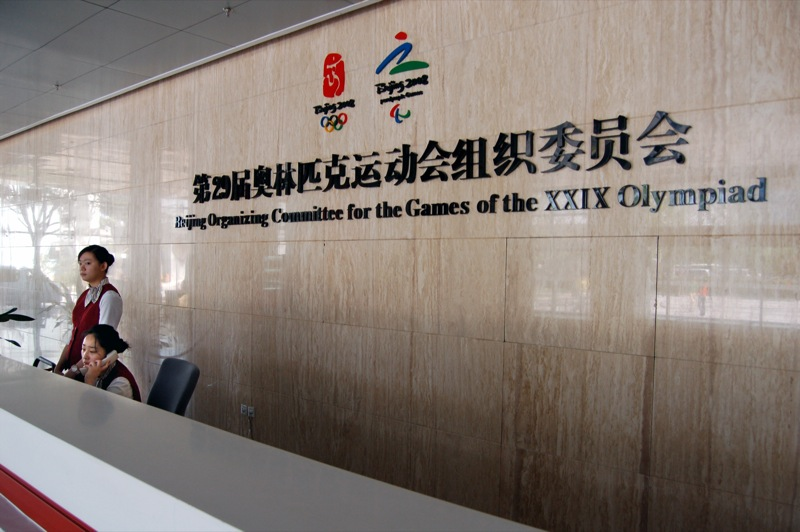
- Headquarters: Beijing
- Chairman: Liu Qi
- Website: beijing2008.cn (archived)

The Beijing Organizing Committee for the Games of the XXIX Olympiad, or BOCOG, also known as the Beijing Organizing Committee, was an informal name for the Beijing Organizing Committee for the Games of the XXIX Olympiad. It was also the organizing committee for the Games of the XIII Paralympiad. The President of BOCOG was Liu Qi (simplified Chinese: 刘淇; traditional Chinese: 劉淇; pinyin: Liú Qí), the then CPC secretary of Beijing Municipality.

== History ==
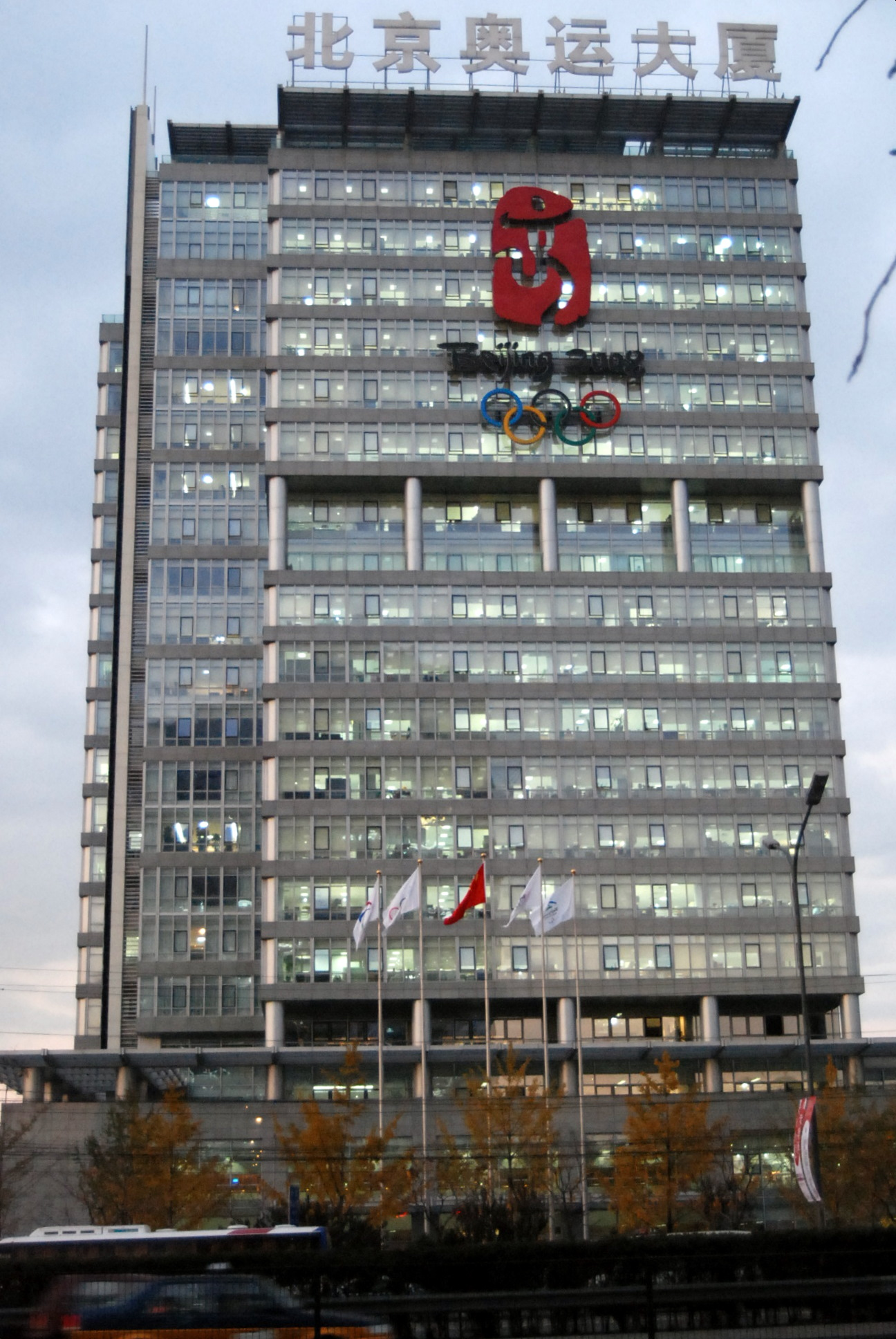
Frontal exterior view

On December 13, 2001, the Organizing Committee for the XXIX Olympiad was officially constituted, initially headquartered at the Xinqiao Hotel in Chongwenmen, which previously housed the Beijing Olympic bidding committee. On September 28, 2002, the office was transferred to the Qinglan Building in Dongsishitiao, and on January 19, 2006, it was moved to the Beijing Olympic Mansion on the North Fourth Ring Road.

On January 28, 2008, BOCOG took control of the Water Cube.

On August 22, 2009, BOCOG is officially dissolved. Its official website is now used by the Beijing Olympic City Development Association.

== Managements ==
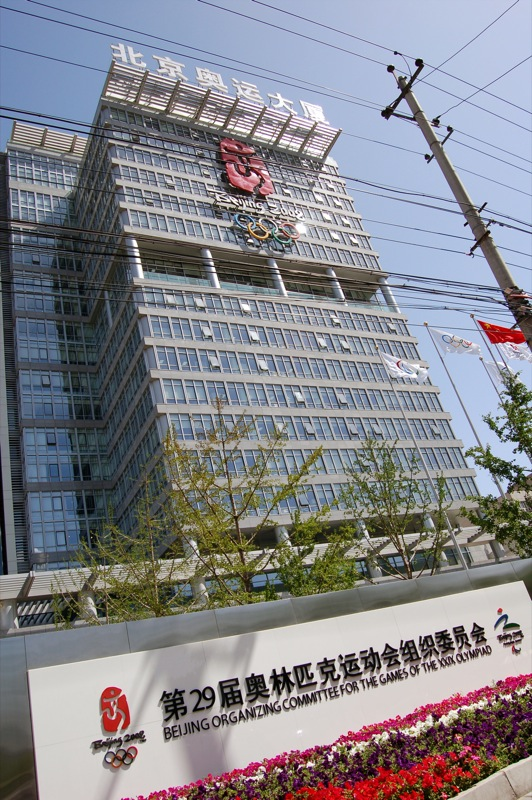
Exterior

The Beijing Organizing Committee for the Olympic Games (BOCOG) has set up a total of 22 functional departments, which were later increased to more than thirty as the preparatory work for the Olympic Games was in full swing.

- Secretarial and Administrative Department
- General Planning Department
- International Liaison Department
- Sports Department
- Press and Publicity Department
- Engineering Department
- Environmental Development Department
- Market Development Department
- Technical Department
- Legal Affairs Department
- Athlete Service Department
- Supervision and Audit Department
- Personnel Department
- Finance Department
- Information Center
- Cultural Activities Department
- Security Department
- Medical and Health Department
- Media Operation Department
- Logistics Department
- Paralympics Department
- Venue Management Department
- Transportation Department
- Torch Relay Center
- Registration Center
- Opening and Closing Ceremony Department
- Olympic Village Department
- Ticket Center
- Volunteer Department

== Composition ==
Chairman

- Liu Qi (December 2001 – August 2009)

Vice-Chairman

- Chen Zhili (2003 – August 2009)
- Liu Yandong (2008 – August 2009)

Executive Chairman

- Yuan Weimin (December 2001 – December 2004)
- Wang Qishan (2003-2007)
- Deng Pufang (January 2004 – 2008)
- Liu Peng (December 2004 – August 2009)
- Guo Jinlong (2007 – August 2009)

Executive Vice Chairman

- Liu Jingmin (December 2001 – August 2009)
- Li Zhijian (December 2001 – 2008)
- Yu Zaiqing (December 2001 – 2008)
- Duan Shijie (December 2001 – 2008)
- Jiang Xiaoyu (December 2001-August 2009)
- Zhang Mao (December 2001 – May 2006)
- Li Binghua (2001–2008)
- Yang Shu'an (2001–2008)
- Tang Xiaoquan (December 2004 – August 2009)
- Wang Wei (2001 – August 2009)

Executive Member

- He Zhenliang
- Gu Yaoming
- Yan Zhongqiu
- Zang Aimin (July 2002 – December 2008)

Secretary General

- Wang Wei (December 2001 – August 2009)
