= CGA =

CGA may refer to:

== Companies and organizations ==
- Canadian Gemmological Association
- Coast Guard Administration of Taiwan
- Controller General of Accounts of Pakistan
- Central of Georgia Railway, in 1833, a.k.a. Central Rail Road and Banking Company of Georgia
- Community of the Glorious Ascension, a Christian monastic community
- Compressed Gas Association
- Connecticut General Assembly, the bicameral legislative body of the American state of Connecticut
- Cooperstown Graduate Association, a museums studies alumni association
- United States Coast Guard Academy, the military academy of the US Coast Guard
- United States Coast Guard Auxiliary, a civilian branch of the US Coast Guard
- Cyngor y Gweithlu Addysg, the Education Workforce Council of Wales
- Casual Games Association, an industry group for casual video game developers and publishers
- Coordination of Anarchist Groups, a French anarchist organization
- Chinese Golf Association, a legal organization representing China to participate in international and Asian golf organizations
- Chinese Gymnastics Association, a legal organization representing China to participate in international and Asian gymnastics organizations
- Confédération générale de l'agriculture, short lived but influential postwar French farmers' union

== Computing ==
- Color Graphics Adapter, IBM's first color display graphics card
- Computer animation, a.k.a. computer-generated animation
- Cryptographically Generated Address, a method for binding a public signature key to an IPv6 address

== Science ==
- Chlorogenic acid, a polyphenolic compound
- Chorionic gonadotropin alpha, a glycoprotein hormone
- Chromogranin A, a member of the granin family of neuroendocrine secretory proteins
- A codon for the amino acid arginine

== Other ==
- Canadian Global Almanac, Canadian reference book
- California's Great America, an amusement park in Santa Clara, California
- Certified General Accountant, Canadian designation
- Ceylon Garrison Artillery, a former name for the Sri Lanka Artillery
- Charitable gift annuity, a gift vehicle in the category of Planned Giving
- Column grid array, a type of integrated circuit package
- Composite Gazetteer of Antarctica, geographical directory
- Conformal geometric algebra
- Consumer Guarantees Act, a 1993 New Zealand law
- Corner Gas Animated, a 2018 TV series
