= Gou Zhongwen =

Chinese politician

- 苟仲文
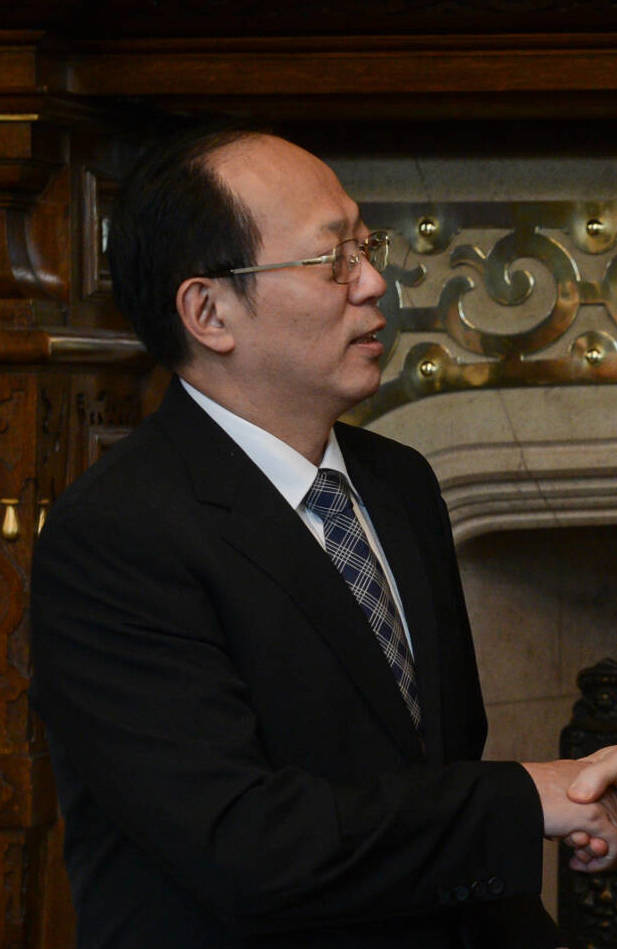
- Gou Zhongwen in September 2017

Director of the State General Administration of Sports
- In office 31 October 2016 – 29 July 2022
- Premier: Li Keqiang
- Preceded by: Liu Peng
- Succeeded by: Gao Zhidan

Personal details
- Born: 26 June 1957 (age 69) Zhenyuan County, Gansu, China
- Party: Chinese Communist Party (1976–2024; expelled)
- Education: Xidian University

Gou Zhongwen (Chinese: 苟仲文; pinyin: Gǒu Zhòngwén; born 26 June 1957) is a Chinese politician who served as director of the State General Administration of Sports from 2016 to 2022.

== Biography ==
Gou was born Zhenyuan County, Gansu province. He joined the Chinese Communist Party in April 1976, the year Mao died. He attended Xidian University with a degree in electrical engineering. He also has a Master's of Business Administration (MBA).

In February 2002, Gou was named Vice Minister of Information Technology. He was transferred to become a vice mayor of Beijing in April 2008.

He became a member of the Beijing party standing committee in July 2013, taking charge of the Zhongguancun administrative district a month later, in addition to overseeing education in the city. In May 2016, he replaced the disgraced Lü Xiwen as deputy party chief of the Chinese capital.

In October 2016, Gou became Director of the State General Administration of Sports. On December 28, 2016, he was elected as the President of the Chinese Olympic Committee. He was the Executive President of the Beijing Organizing Committee for the 2022 Olympic and Paralympic Winter Games.

In 2019, he was elected as the new president of the International Wushu Federation.

He was awarded the Silver Olympic Order after the 2022 Winter Olympics.

In August 2022, Gou stepped down as Director of the State General Administration of Sports after reaching the age of 65.

== Investigation ==
On 30 May 2024, Gou was suspected of "serious violations of laws and regulations" by the Central Commission for Discipline Inspection (CCDI), the party's internal disciplinary body, and the National Supervisory Commission, the highest anti-corruption agency of China. On December 12, he was expelled from the CCP and removed from public office. On December 19, he was arrested by the Supreme People's Procuratorate for suspected bribe taking.

On 6 May 2025, he was indicted on charges of bribery by the Supreme People's Procuratorate.

On 8 December 2025, Gou was sentenced to death with a two-year reprieve by the Yancheng Intermediate People's Court, for bribery and abuse of power.

Party political offices
Preceded by Zhao Fengtong	Secretary of the Education Committee of the Beijing Municipal Committee of the Chinese Communist Party; 2013–2016	Succeeded by Lin Keqing
Preceded by Lü Xiwen	Deputy Communist Party Secretary of Beijing; 2016	Succeeded by Jing Junhai
Government offices
Preceded by Liu Peng	Director of the State General Administration of Sports; 2016–2022	Succeeded by Gao Zhidan
Political offices
Preceded by Liu Peng	Chairman of the All-China Sports Federation; 2016–2022	Succeeded by Gao Zhidan
Preceded by Liu Peng	President of the Chinese Olympic Committee; 2016–2022	Succeeded by Gao Zhidan
