= 2022 Asian Para Games opening ceremony =

- Date: 22 October 2023; 2 years ago
- Time: 19:30 – 20:55 CST (UTC+8)
- Venue: Hangzhou Sports Park Stadium
- Location: Hangzhou, China; 30°13′53.93″N 120°13′26.96″E
- Theme: Hearts Meet, Dreams Shine
- Filmed by: IGBS on behalf of CMG

The opening ceremony for the 2022 Asian Para Games was held on 22 October 2023, at the Hangzhou Sports Park Stadium in Hangzhou, Zhejiang, China. The ceremony began at 7:30 PM China Standard Time (UTC+8).

== Background ==
The 2022 Asian Para Games ceremony was choreographed by Sha Xiaolan (沙曉蘭), who was an assistant director to Zhang Yimou during the 2022 Winter Paralympics opening ceremony, and closing ceremony production unit. Sha was also previously directed the 2022 Asian Games opening ceremony and closing ceremony production.

== Summary ==
It was originally planned to open at 8 pm, but considering the temperature factors and the need to end as early as possible to allow athletes to rest, it was moved earlier. It was attended by Chinese Vice Premier Ding Xuexiang, some Asian leaders, APC President Majid Rashed and the President of the International Paralympic Committee, Andrew Parsons.

The opening ceremony was themed "Hearts Meet, Dreams Shine" and lasted about 85 minutes.

=== APC Flag bearers ===
The eight Asian Paralympic Committee flag bearers at the opening ceremony were:

- Ge Yang: Para table tennis Grand Slam winner. He won 6 Paralympic gold medals in 2004 Athens, 2008 Beijing, 2012 London and 2016 Rio. He also won 5 World Championships (2002 Taipei, 2006 Montreux and 2010 Gwangju).
- Zhang Xiaoling: A table tennis player who won 9 Paralympic gold medals in five consecutive Paralympic table tennis competitions (1988 Seoul, 1992 Barcelona, 1996 Atlanta, 2000 Sydney and 2004 Athens).
- Yang Hongqiong: A cross-country skier who won all three distances of the cross-country skiing women's seated group gold medals at the 2022 Beijing Winter Paralympics. She served as the flag bearer of the Chinese delegation at the closing ceremony and was named the Beijing Winter Olympics and Winter Paralympics Will make outstanding individual contributions.
- Ping Yali: A track and field athlete, winner of the Chinese delegation's first Paralympic gold medal (women's long jump B2 at the 1984 Summer Paralympic Games), and one of the torchbearers at the opening ceremony of the 2008 Summer Paralympic Games.
- Zhou Jiamin: Archery athlete, the 2016 Summer Paralympics archery compound bow open level women's individual and mixed team gold medalist, and one of the flag bearers of the Chinese delegation at the 2020 Summer Paralympic Games.
- Li Duan: Track and field athlete and former able-bodied basketball player. He won the F11 long jump and triple jump gold medals at the 2008 Beijing Paralympic Games and the 2012 Summer Paralympic Games. He is also the torch igniter of the 2022 Paralympic Winter Games.
- Song Mao: A swimmer, 2016 Rio Paralympics swimming men's 100-meter butterfly S8 champion.
- Wang Yinan: A swimmer who won three gold medals each in swimming competitions at the 2012 London Paralympic Games and the 2016 Rio Paralympic Games.

=== Torchbearers ===
The six torchbearers at the opening ceremony were:

- Zhou Guohua: A track and field athlete, two-time Paralympic gold medalist (London 2012 & Rio 2016), two-time World Championships (Lyon 2013 & Doha 2015) gold medalist.
- Zheng Xiongying: A athlete from Zhejiang Province (sitting volleyball), the team gold medal winner at three Paralympic Games (Athens 2004, Beijing 2008 and London 2012) and the Asian Paralympic Games (2010).
- Hou Bin: Paralympic track and field athlete, high jump gold medalist (F42 level) at three Paralympic Games (1996, 2000, 2004), current Vice Chairman of the Chinese Paralympic Committee, the last torch in the opening ceremony of the 2008 Beijing Paralympic Games Hand, the IPC flag bearer for the 2022 Beijing Paralympic Winter Games.
- Du Jianping: A swimmer from Zhejiang Province, he won 9 golds, 4 silvers and 2 bronzes in three Paralympic Games (2004, 2008, 2012). In 2008, he won the first gold medal for the Chinese Sports Delegation in the Beijing Paralympic Games.
- Wang Haitao: A athlete and captain of the Chinese wheelchair curling team. In 2018, he led the team to win China's first gold medal/medal at the Winter Paralympics and successfully defended the title in 2022.
- Xu Jialing: A swimmer from Zhejiang, won the 100-meter butterfly gold medal, 400-meter freestyle bronze medal, and 4×100-meter freestyle relay bronze medal at the 2016 Rio Paralympic Games; and won the 50-meter freestyle gold medal and the 100-meter freestyle gold medal at the 2018 Jakarta Asian Paralympic Games. Freestyle gold medal, 100m butterfly gold medal, 100m backstroke gold medal, 200m medley gold medal, 4×100m medley relay gold medal, 4×100m freestyle relay gold medal, 100m breaststroke silver medal, 400m freestyle silver medal.

== See also ==
- 2022 Winter Paralympics opening ceremony
- 2022 Asian Games opening ceremony
- 2022 Asian Games closing ceremony
- 2022 Asian Para Games closing ceremony
