= Yang Shu'an =

Chinese sports official

Yang Shu'an (born August 1957, Chinese: 杨树安), a native of Qinyang, Henan, is a Chinese sports administrator.

== Biography ==
Shu'an graduated from the Xi'an Physical Education University in 1982. He was the vice-chairman of the Beijing Organizing Committee for the Olympic Games. He was appointed deputy director and a member of the party group of the General Administration of Sport of China in November 2008. He served as the deputy secretary of the party group and the deputy director of the General Administration of Sport of China from December 2014 to December 2017. He was the vice president of the All-China Sports Federation from December 2023 to June 2024.

In March 2018, he was appointed deputy director of the National People's Congress Education, Science, Culture and Public Health Committee.
