= Li Menghua =

Chinese sports official

- 李梦华

President of the Chinese Olympic Committee
- In office 15 March 1986 – 29 December 1988
- Preceded by: Zhong Shitong
- Succeeded by: He Zhenliang

Director of the Sports Commission of the People's Republic of China
- In office 10 September 1981 – December 1988
- Preceded by: Wang Meng
- Succeeded by: Wu Shaozu

Chairman of the Chinese Weiqi Association
- In office 1962–1988
- Preceded by: New title
- Succeeded by: Chen Zude

Chairman of the Chinese Wushu Association
- In office September 1958 – 1964
- Preceded by: New title
- Succeeded by: Dong Shouyi

Personal details
- Born: November 10, 1922 Pingshan County, Zhili, China
- Died: 9 November 2010 (aged 87) Beijing, China
- Party: Chinese Communist Party
- Education: Pingshan County Jianyi Normal School

Chinese name
- Simplified Chinese: 李梦华
- Traditional Chinese: 李夢華
Transcriptions
Standard Mandarin
- Hanyu Pinyin: Lǐ Mènghuá

Li Menghua (Chinese: 李梦华; 10 November 1922 – 9 November 2010) was a Chinese politician who served as director of the Sports Commission of the People's Republic of China from 1981 to 1988 and president of the Chinese Olympic Committee from 1986 to 1988.

Li was a delegate to the 5th National People's Congress. He was a member of the Standing Committee of the 8th Chinese People's Political Consultative Conference. He was a member of the 12th and 13th Central Committee of the Chinese Communist Party.

== Career ==
Li was born into a family of farming background in Pingshan County, Zhili, on 10 November 1922. He attended Pingshan County Jianyi Normal School. In November 1937, he joined the propaganda team of the 358th Brigade of the Eighth Route Army as a propagandist. He joined the Chinese Communist Party (CCP) in January 1938. Afterwards, he worked in the Jin-Cha-Ji Border Region for a long time.

In November 1954, Li was transferred to Beijing and appointed director of the Sports Competition Department of the National Sports Commission (now General Administration of Sport of China), and was elevated to deputy director of the National Sports Commission in December 1960. He also served as chairman of the newly founded Chinese Wushu Association.

On 11 November 1961, the Chinese Weiqi Association was established in Hefei, Anhui, the than vice premier Chen Yi was elected as honorary chairman, and Li as the founding chairman.

In 1966, the Cultural Revolution broke out, and Li was sent to the May Seventh Cadre Schools in Tunliu County, Shanxi to do farm work. He was reinstated in 1971. On 10 September 1981, he was chosen as director of the Sports Commission of the People's Republic of China. On 15 March 1986, he was selected as president of the Chinese Olympic Committee.

On 9 November 2010, Li died of an illness in Beijing, at the age of 87.

Sporting positions
New title	Chairman of the Chinese Wushu Association; 1958–1964	Succeeded by Dong Shouyi
New title	Chairman of the Chinese Weiqi Association; 1962–1988	Succeeded by Chen Zude
Preceded by Zhong Shitong	President of the Chinese Olympic Committee; 1986–1988	Succeeded by He Zhenliang
Government offices
Preceded by Wang Meng	Director of the Sports Commission of the People's Republic of China; 1981–1988	Succeeded by Wu Shaozu
