= 2022 Asian Games closing ceremony =

Closing ceremony of the Hangzhou 2022 Asian Games

- Date: 8 October 2023; 3 years ago
- Time: 20:00 – 21:30 CST (UTC+8)
- Location: Hangzhou, Zhejiang, China; 30°13′53.93″N 120°13′26.96″E
- Theme: Hangzhou To Be Remembered
- Filmed by: IGBS on behalf of CMG

The 2022 Asian Games closing ceremony was held on Sunday, 8 October 2023, at the Hangzhou Sports Park Stadium in Hangzhou. It began at 8:00pm China Standard Time (UTC+8), lasting one and a half hours.

== Background ==
The 2022 Asian Games closing ceremonies was produced by Sha Xiaolan (沙曉蘭), who was one of assistant directors to Zhang Yimou during the 2022 Winter Olympics opening ceremony and closing ceremony production. The theme of the closing ceremony was "Hangzhou to be remembered", which is intended to convey the joy and farewell feeling of farewell.

== Proceedings ==
=== Welcome ===
The Premier of the State Council of the People's Republic of China Li Qiang and the Acting President of the OCA Randhir Singh entered the venue.

=== Closing speeches ===
Chairman of the Hangzhou Asian Organizing Committee and Chairman of the Chinese Olympic Committee and Acting President of the Olympic Council of Asia delivered the ending speeches and the Acting President announced the closure of this edition of the Asian Games.

=== Handover ceremony and performance ===
In compliance with the practice of previous Asian Games, the protocol dictates that during the lowering the flag during the Olympic Council of Asia anthem. After the lowering of the flag, the torch, emblem and the flags of the Olympic Council of Asia and the 1951 Asian Games were handed over on site. The national flag of Japan, the host country of the 2026 Asian Games was raised.

After the handover ceremonies, Aichi Prefecture in Japan made a 15-minute presentation as now as the host prefecture for the next Asian Games.

=== Fire-extinguishing ceremony ===
In this session, the digital torch bearer "Trendster" who made an appearance at the opening ceremony will return again and witness with the audience the moment when the Asian Games flame is extinguished.

== Anthems ==
- - National Anthem of China
- - National Anthem of Japan

== Officials and guests ==
=== Host country dignitaries ===
- China
  - Premier Li Qiang
  - President of the Chinese Olympic Committee Gao Zhidan
  - CCP Secretary of Hangzhou Liu Jie
  - Mayor of Hangzhou Yao Gaoyuan
  - Executive Secretary-General of the HAGOC and Deputy Mayor of Hangzhou Chen Weiqiang
  - CCP Secretary of Zhejiang Province Yi Lianhong
  - Governor of Zhejiang Province Wang Hao

=== Next host country dignitaries ===
- Japan
  - Chief Cabinet Secretary Hirokazu Matsuno (representing Prime Minister Fumio Kishida)
  - Governor of Aichi Prefecture Hideaki Ōmura
  - Secretary-General of the AINAGOC Satoshi Murate
  - Director-General of the AINAGOC Shin Kojima
  - Former president of the TOCOG Seiko Hashimoto
  - President of the JOC Yasuhiro Yamashita

=== Foreign dignitaries ===
- Cambodia – President of the Senate of Cambodia Say Chhum (representing King Norodom Sihamoni and Prime Minister Hun Manet)
- Uzbekistan – Prime Minister of Uzbekistan Abdulla Aripov (representing President Shavkat Mirziyoyev)

=== International Organizations ===
- Acting President of the OCA Randhir Singh

== See also ==
- 2022 Asian Games opening ceremony
