= Chinese Triathlon Sports Association =

Sports governing body in China

The Chinese Triathlon Sports Association (CTSA, Chinese: 中国铁人三项运动协会), established in 1990, is a non-profit social organization overseen by the State General Administration of Sports and registered with the Ministry of Civil Affairs of the People's Republic of China. It is also a member of the All-China Sports Federation.

== Historical Overview ==
In 1989, the General Administration of Sport of China designated triathlon as a recognized sport in China. On January 16, 1990, the Chinese Triathlon Sports Association was proved by the State Sports Commission and the All China Sports Federation for establishment in Beijing, subsequently affiliating with the Chinese Olympic Committee and the International Triathlon Union within the same year.
