= Chinese Weightlifting Association =

Chinese sports organisation

The Chinese Weightlifting Association (CWA, Chinese: 中国举重协会) is a mass sports organisation and an independent legal entity that is registered with the Ministry of Civil Affairs and is subject to the administrative supervision of the State General Administration of Sports. CWA is the sole legal organisation representing China that participates in international weightlifting organisations and activities. It is one of the single sport associations under the supervision of the All-China Sports Federation.

== History ==
In 1956, the Chinese Weightlifting Association was established in Beijing. The association has organised athletes to participate in world competitions and international invitational competitions on numerous occasions since its inception, and its interactions with other countries have become increasingly frequent. It has fostered friendships with weightlifters from various countries and regions and has fortified relationships and collaborations with the International Weightlifting Federation and the Asian Weightlifting Federation.
