= 2024 China Youth Football League =

China Youth Football League
- Organising body: Chinese Football Association, Ministry of Education, State General Administration of Sport
- Founded: 2022
- Country: China
- Divisions: Primary school (U8–U12); Junior high school (U13–U15); High school (U16–U17); University (U18–U19)
- Website: Official website

2024 China Youth Football League (Chinese: 2024中国青少年足球联赛) was the third edition of the national youth football competition organized by the Chinese Football Association (CFA), Ministry of Education, and State General Administration of Sport.

== Structure ==
1. Age Groups: The league comprised 18 age categories (9 male, 9 female) divided into four tiers:
  - Primary school: U8–U12.
  - Junior high school: U13–U15.
  - High school: U16–U17.
  - University: U18–U19.
2. Qualification:
  - Regional qualifiers were held in provinces such as Hainan, Guangdong, and Liaoning, with winners advancing to national finals.
  - National finals occurred in Dalian, Zhuhai, and Yunnan from August to November 2024.

== Key events ==
1. Finals:
  - U19 Male Final: Shandong Taishan U19 defeated Zhejiang U19 11–10 in a penalty shootout on October 29, 2024.
  - U17 Male Final: Langfang Glory City U17 won 1–0 against Shanghai Port U17 on September 29, 2024.
2. Disciplinary Actions:
  - The CFA penalized Shijiazhuang No. 44 Middle School Rongzhihe FC and Langfang No. 1 Middle School FC for rule violations during qualifiers.
  - Twenty-seven teams, including Hainan Zhonghong, received commendations for adherence to league regulations.
3. Participant Statistics:
  - Over 50,000 players from 30 provinces registered, including regions such as Tibet and Xinjiang.
  - The U17 male group involved 64 teams, split into eight groups during the national finals.
