= CJA =

CJA may refer to:

- Center for Justice and Accountability
- CanJet, a low-cost chartered airline based in Canada
- Criminal Justice Act
- Climate Justice Action
- CJA, the guitarist from the Futurians
- Center for Jewish Art
- Chinese Judo Association
