= Chinese Taekwondo Association =

Sports governing body in China

The Chinese Taekwondo Association (Chinese: 中国跆拳道协会), officially proved by the Ministry of Civil Affairs of the People's Republic of China, was founded in Beijing in 2004. It operates as a non-profit sports association under the auspices of the All-China Sports Federation and is the sole legal entity recognized by the Chinese Olympic Committee to represent China in relevant international taekwondo organizations and events.

The China Taekwondo Association was created in 2004.
