= Zhang Zhenhuan =

Zhang Zhenhuan may refer to:

- Zhang Zhenhuan (general)
- Zhang Zhenhuan (actor), now known as Zhang Zhenxuan
