= Chinese Archery Association =

Chinese sports organisation

The Chinese Archery Association (CAA, Chinese: 中国射箭协会) is a national, non-profit sports organisation that possesses independent legal status. As a component of the All-China Sports Federation, CAA is a sole legal entity representing China in international archery events.

== History ==
The Chinese Archery Association, which was established on February 3, 1964, and is headquartered in Beijing, is dedicated to the union of archery devotees and athletes throughout the nation. Its objective is to advance and enhance archery, provide assistance to the National Fitness Plan. In addition, the CAA strives to fortify international cooperation and camaraderie with archery associations worldwide by fostering relationships with international archery bodies, including the International Archery Federation (FIAR) and the Asian Archery Federation (AARF). Currently, Gao Zhidan serves as the association's administrator.
