= Chinese Ski Association =

Governing body of skiing in China

The Chinese Ski Association (Chinese: 中国滑雪协会) is a national mass organization for skiing in China and one of several sports associations led by the All-China Sports Federation. It is abbreviated as "CSA" and is headquartered in Beijing.

== History ==
The Chinese Ski Association was originally part of the National Winter Sports Association, which was founded in the 1950s. It became an independent organization in 1984, with its headquarters in Beijing. The Chinese Ski Association is a national mass sports social organization registered with the Ministry of Civil Affairs, a member of the All-China Sports Federation, and a national sports association recognized by the Chinese Olympic Committee. It is the sole legal organization representing China at international and intercontinental snow events conducted by the International Ski Federation and other international snow organizations. The association is a voluntary, non-profit social organization. The Chinese Ski Association established its Snow Medical Rescue Committee in 2023.
