= Chinese Fencing Association =

Founded in May 1973, the Chinese Fencing Association (Chinese: 中国击剑协会) is a member of the All-China Sports Federation, a national sports association approved by the Chinese Olympic Committee, the only official legal entity representing China in all kinds of fencing events, and the International Fencing Federation, Asian Fencing Federation, and other international fencing organizations.

== History ==
The Chinese Fencing Association formally joined the International Fencing Federation on May 17, 1974, at the FIE Congress held in Monte Carlo, Monaco.
