= Chinese Modern Pentathlon Association =

Sports governing body in China

Established in 1984, the Chinese Modern Pentathlon Association (CMPA, Chinese: 中国现代五项运动协会) is a national organization for mass sports, including modern pentathlon experts and several professional entities.

== History ==
The China Modern Pentathlon Association became a member of the International Modern Pentathlon Federation in 1986 and joined the Asian Pentathlon League in 1989. It is a member of the All-China Sports Federation and a national sports body acknowledged by the Chinese Olympic Committee. The association adheres to the business directives of the State General Administration of Sports and is subject to the oversight and regulation of the Ministry of Civil Affairs. The Chinese Modern Pentathlon Association is the sole legal entity representing China in international modern pentathlon events and the International Modern Pentathlon Union.
