= Chinese Golf Association =

Sports governing body in China

In May 1985, the Chinese Golf Association (CGA, Chinese: 中国高尔夫球协会; pinyin: Zhōngguó gāo'ěrfū qiú xiéhuì) was established. Chinese Golf Association is the sole legal organization representing China to participate in international and Asian golf organizations and corresponding international golf activities. It is a group member of the All-China Sports Federation, an Olympic sport organization recognized by the Chinese Olympic Committee.

== History ==
The Chinese Golf Association was established on May 24, 1985, and is currently administered by 11 professional committees that are responsible for professional golf, amateur golf, women's golf, juvenile golf, course administration, almost system, and other tasks.
