= Chinese Rowing Association =

Chinese sports organization

The Chinese Rowing Association (CRA, Chinese: 中国赛艇协会) is a singular rowing sports organization governed by the All-China Sports Federation, serving as the national body for rowing in China.

== Biography ==
Originally established as the "China Rowing Association" on January 15, 1973, it was re-branded as the "China Boat Association" on March 9, 1979, and subsequently reverted to "China Rowing Association" on September 28, 1979. The headquarters is located in Beijing. In 1973, the China Rowing Association formally affiliated with the International Rowing Federation.
