= Chinese Diving Association =

the Chinese Diving Association (CDA, Chinese: 中国跳水协会) was officially established as the national professional organisation for diving in China on January 11, 2020.

== History ==
The inaugural general meeting of the Chinese Diving Association was conducted in Beijing on January 11, 2020, marking its official launch. Wang Yuping, Li Jun, Ge Jun, and Hu Jia were elected as vice presidents of the association, while Zhou Jihong was elected as its president. Liu Jiangping was appointed Secretary-General.
