= Lü Xiwen =

Chinese politician

- 吕锡文

Deputy Party Secretary of Beijing
- In office April 2013 – November 2015
- Party Secretary: Guo Jinlong
- Preceded by: Ji Lin
- Succeeded by: Gou Zhongwen

Personal details
- Born: July 1955 (age 71) Ningbo, Zhejiang, China
- Party: Chinese Communist Party (expelled)
- Education: Beijing Institute of Technology

Lü Xiwen (simplified Chinese: 吕锡文; traditional Chinese: 呂錫文; pinyin: Lǚ Xīwén; born July 1955) is a Chinese politician who served as the Deputy Communist Party Secretary of Beijing between 2013 and 2015, and prior to that, the head of the Organization Department of the Beijing Party Committee. She was investigated for corruption in 2015, and later expelled from the Communist Party.

== Life and career ==
Lü was born in Ningbo, Zhejiang province. During the Cultural Revolution, she was part of production teams performing manual labour in rural Beijing. She joined the Chinese Communist Party in August 1982. She has a degree in textiles engineering from the Beijing Industry College (now Beijing Institute of Technology).

She then worked in the Communist Youth League organization at her alma mater, before being transferred to the municipal finance office, then the municipal department of industry, then the municipal party Organization Department. She then rose to become deputy party chief, district governor, and finally party chief of Xicheng District (prefecture rank). Beginning in 2007, Lü headed the Organization Department of the Beijing party organization and became a member of the municipal Party Standing Committee. She was named Deputy Party Secretary of Beijing in 2013, ascending to the third-ranked position in the Beijing party organization, succeeding Ji Lin.

During her term in office, along with Chen Yiqin, she was one of only two female provincial-level zhuanzhi Deputy Party Secretaries in the Chinese Communist Party. She is also president of the Beijing Party School, the Beijing School of Administration, and an alternate member of the 18th Central Committee of the Chinese Communist Party. She is considered a "homegrown" Beijing establishment politician, having spent her entire career in the capital.

On November 11, 2015, Lü Xiwen was placed under investigation by the Central Commission for Discipline Inspection for "serious violations of regulations". She was the first provincial-ministerial level official being examined from Beijing after the 18th Party Congress in 2012. On January 5, 2016, Lü Xiwen was expelled from the Chinese Communist Party. The party's internal investigation concluded that Lü "violated political rules, trivialized policies and the direction of the party centre, formed factions of her own, resisted investigation, did not honestly report her own activities to the [investigating] organization, interfered in the personnel decisions of her previous area of oversight [assumed to be Xicheng District], lost control of her staff, violated the Eight-point Regulation, frequented private clubs; interfered with the market economy, interfered with law enforcement; violated lifestyle discipline, lived a life of luxury and pleasure seeking."

On February 20, 2017, Lü was sentenced to 13 years in prison for taking bribes worth 18.78 million yuan (~$2.73 million) by the Intermediate People's Court in Jilin.

== Personal life ==
Lü is married to Yu Shaoshu (于少枢), who is one year her senior. The family lived in the Rongzefu complex (融泽府) of Beijing's Xicheng District, near Fuxingmen. Yu was born in Nanjing. Yu was supposedly the General Manager of a precision-cutting tool company called Beijing J.I. Cutting Tool Company, Ltd., registered in Hong Kong. J.I. Cutting Tool Company was founded initially with the intent of bringing ISCAR Metalworking products to China. Yu had possessed a Hong Kong passport since 1993. Lü is a tennis fan, and took a special interest in international tennis competitions held in Beijing.

Party political offices
Preceded by Ji Lin	Deputy Party Secretary of Beijing; 2013–2015	Succeeded by Gou Zhongwen
