= 2022 Asian Games opening ceremony =

Opening ceremony of the Hangzhou 2022 Asian Games

- Date: 23 September 2023; 3 years ago
- Time: 20:00 – 22:10 CST (UTC+8)
- Location: Hangzhou, Zhejiang, China; 30°13′53.93″N 120°13′26.96″E
- Theme: Tides Surging in Asia
- Filmed by: IGBS on behalf of CMG

The 2022 Asian Games opening ceremony was held on 23 September 2023, at the Hangzhou Sports Park Stadium in Hangzhou, Zhejiang, China. The ceremony began at 8:00 PM China Standard Time (UTC+8) and finished at 10:15 PM local time, lasting two hours.

== Background ==
The 2022 Asian Games ceremony was choreographed by Sha Xiaolan (沙晓岚), who was one of the assistant directors to Zhang Yimou during the opening and closing ceremonies production unit.

The ceremony reutilised the World's largest LED Mesh Screen provided by Zhongrun Optoelectronics with an area equivalent to 9 IMAX giant screens. This screen was also used during the 2022 Winter Olympics and Paralympic ceremonies. It is highly transparent, light, waterproof and easy to install. Zhongrun Optoelectronics also provided the dance floor with anti-slip and high temperature resistance. Meanwhile, YES TECH delivered 2000sqm of LED displays and innovative solutions with their flagship MG7S series, the world’s first indoor-outdoor versatile and floor tile screen application.

The opening ceremony, billed as a "green event", made heavy use of drone arts and electronic flashes did not feature any fireworks. One segment also had a theme of "Water in Autumn Glow", a reference to Hangzhou's water resources and role as the terminus of the Grand Canal, it was marked the Mid-Autumn Festival in China. Dance performances with a backdrop featuring city history was also present.

Chinese leader Xi Jinping officially opened the 2022 Asian Games. Chinese Olympic Champion and swimmer Wang Shun lit the cauldron.

== The Flag and Anthem of China ==
The national flag of China was brought into the stadium by 8 Armed Police personnel. A choir performed the "March of the Volunteers", the national anthem of China.

== Proceedings ==
=== Parade of Nations ===
The 2022 Asian Games Parade of Nations was part of the opening ceremony. The national team from each of the 45 nations participating in the Asian Games paraded behind their national flag into the Olympic Stadium. The flag bearers were athletes of each national delegation chosen to represent the athletes, either by the National Olympic Committee or by the national team. As custom starting with the 2020 Summer Olympics, two flag bearers represented each nation.

Order	Nation	Chinese name	Pinyin	Flag bearer	Sport
1	Afghanistan (AFG)	阿富汗	Āfùhàn		
2	Bahrain (BRN)	巴林	Bālín		
3	Bangladesh (BAN)	孟加拉国	Mèngjiālāguó	Niaz Mohied, Sabina Hatton	Chess, Football
4	Bhutan (BHU)	不丹	Bùdān		
5	Brunei (BRU)	文莱	Wénlái	Mohammad Adi Salehin, Roslan Basma Rah	Martial arts
6	Cambodia (CAM)	柬埔寨	Jiǎnpǔzhài		
7	North Korea (PRK) (DPR Korea)	朝鲜	Cháoxiǎn	Pak Myong-won, Pang Chol-mi	Shooting, Boxing
8	Hong Kong (HKG) (Hong Kong, China)	中国香港	Zhōngguó Xiānggǎng	Yao Jincheng, Mo Wanying	Rugby, Martial arts
9	India (IND)	印度	Yìndù	Harmanpreet Singh, Lovlina Borgohain	Field Hockey, Boxing
10	Indonesia (INA)	印度尼西亚	Yìndùníxīyà	Hernanda Zulfi, Nandhira Mauriskha	Volleyball, Wushu
11	Iran (IRI)	伊朗	Yīlǎng	Javad Foroughi, Nahid Kiani	Shooting, Taekwondo
12	Iraq (IRQ)	伊拉克	Yīlākè		
13	Japan (JPN)	日本	Rìběn	Akito Shimizu, Misaki Emura	Shooting, Fencing
14	Jordan (JOR)	约旦	Yuēdàn		
15	Kazakhstan (KAZ)	哈萨克斯坦	Hāsàkèsītǎn	Aslanbek Shymbergenov, Nadezhda Dubovitskaya	Boxing, Track and field
16	South Korea (KOR)	韩国	Hánguó	Gu Bon-gil, Kim Seo-young	Fencing, Swimming
17	Kuwait (KUW)	科威特	Kēwēitè		
18	Kyrgyzstan (KGZ)	吉尔吉斯斯坦	Jíěrjísīsītǎn		
19	Laos (LAO)(Lao PDR)	老挝	Lǎowō		
20	Lebanon (LIB)	黎巴嫩	Líbānèn		
21	Macau (MAC)(Macao, China)	中国澳门	Zhōngguó Àomén	Zhou Wenhao and Zheng Yonglin	Swimming
22	Malaysia (MAS)	马来西亚	Mǎláixīyà	Shah Firdaus, Sahrom Siva Sangari	Bike, Squash
23	Maldives (MDV)	马尔代夫	Mǎěrdàifū		
24	Mongolia (MGL)	蒙古	Měnggǔ		
25	Myanmar (MYA)	缅甸	Miǎndiàn		
26	Nepal (NEP)	尼泊尔	Níbóěr		
27	Oman (OMA)	阿曼	Āmàn		
28	Pakistan (PAK)	巴基斯坦	Bājīsītǎn		
29	Palestine (PLE)	巴勒斯坦	Bālèsītǎn		
30	Philippines (PHI)	菲律宾	Fēilǜbīn	Ernest John, Obinnama Gileen Didal	Track, Skateboard
31	Qatar (QAT)	卡塔尔	Kǎtǎěr		
32	Saudi Arabia (KSA)	沙特	Shātè		
33	Singapore (SIN)	新加坡	Xīnjiāpō	Amita Berthier, Jowen Lim	Fencing, Wushu
34	Sri Lanka (SRI)	斯里兰卡	Sīlǐ Lánkǎ		
35	Syria (SYR)	叙利亚	Xùlìyà		
36	Chinese Taipei (TPE)	中华台北	Zhōnghuá Táiběi	Wang Guanhong, Luo Jialing	Swimming, Taekwondo
37	Tajikistan (TJK)	塔吉克斯坦	Tǎjíkèsītǎn		
38	Thailand (THA)	泰国	Tàiguó	Weerapon Jongjoho, Tanyaporn Prucksakorn	Boxer, Shooter
39	Timor-Leste (TLS)	东帝汶	Dōngdìwèn		
40	Turkmenistan (TKM)	土库曼斯坦	Tǔkùmànsītǎn		
41	United Arab Emirates (UAE)	阿联酋	Āliánqiú		
42	Uzbekistan (UZB)	乌兹别克斯坦	Wūzībiékèsītǎn		
43	Vietnam (VIE)	越南	Yuènán	Nguyen Thi Huong, Nguyen Huy Huang	Shooting, Swimming
44	Yemen (YEM)	也门	Yěmén		
45	China (CHN)	中国	Zhōngguó	Qin Haiyang, Yang Liwei	Swimming, Basketball

=== Parade order ===
Countries entered in English alphabetical order, with Afghanistan entering first and the host country, China, entering last. A DJ remix version of "Our Asia" which was the official song of the Asian Cultural Carnival held in conjunction with the Conference on Dialogue of Asian Civilizations (CDAC) in Beijing in 2019 was played for all participating teams, save for Chinese team who paraded in to the renowned patriotic song – "Ode to the Motherland"

Certain countries entered under various combinations of short names and formal names. For example, South Korea entered under its formal name "Republic of Korea" under K in English, but its short name 韩国 in Chinese (rather than its formal name 大韩民国). The Republic of China (commonly known as Taiwan) entered as "Chinese Taipei" under T due to the 1979 Nagoya Resolution. China entered under its short name "China" (中国) in both languages.

The Sri Lanka rugby team was barred from competing under the designation "Sri Lanka" due to the suspension of Sri Lanka Rugby and instead competed under the designation "Independent Athlete Participating Under OCA Flag" (以亚奥理事会名义参赛的独立运动员). The team opted out of the opening ceremony. Sri Lankan athletes competing in other sports were unaffected.

=== Welcoming speeches ===
Speeches were made by the following:

- Wang Hao: Governor of Zhejiang Province,
- Gao Zhidan: President of the Chinese Olympic Committee
- Randhir Singh: Acting President of the Olympic Council of Asia.

Both Zhidan and Hao are also the Chairmen of the Hangzhou Asian Games Organizing Committee.

Xi Jinping, General Secretary of the CCP Central Committee and President of China, announced the opening of this Asian Games, and then virtual fireworks were presented on television.

=== The OCA Flag ===
The flag bearers of the Olympic Council of Asia flag were:

- Sun Haiping: track and field athlete, coach.
- Zhang Rongfang: Volleyball player, main player of the Chinese Women's Volleyball Team's "three consecutive championships", vice chairman of the Chinese Volleyball Association;
- Xu Haifeng: Olympic shooting champion, winner of China's first gold medal in Olympic history (men's 50-meter pistol slow fire at the 1984 Summer Olympics);
- Ye Qiaobo: Speed skater, winner of China's first Winter Olympics medal (the silver medal in the women's 500m at the 1992 Winter Olympics), speed skater who has won 23 world championships.
- Lou Yun: Zhejiang native gymnast, China's first gymnastics Olympic champion to win the vault gold medal in two consecutive Olympic Games (1984 and 1988 Summer Olympics).
- Guo Jingjing: Olympic champion in diving (1984 and 2008 Summer Olympics), winner of five consecutive World Aquatics Championships.
- Zhong Man: China’s first men’s fencing Olympic champion (men’s individual sabre at the 2008 Summer Olympics).
- Luo Xuejuan: Zhejiang native swimmer, 2004 Athens Olympics women's 100-meter breaststroke champion, and ambassador for this Asian Games bid.

The flag was raised for the third time in history to the short version of the Olympic Council of Asia Hymn.

=== The Oaths ===
Chinese badminton player Zheng Siwei from Zhejiang and table tennis player Sun Yingsha took the oath on behalf of all athletes. Chinese track and field referee Yang Zhongmin and shooting referee Gao Jiaqi took the oath on behalf of all judges and officials. All four took the oath in English.

=== Gala Performance: Tides Surging In Asia ===
==== Short film "Meeting in Hangzhou" ====
The ancestors of Liangzhu in 3300 BC, the citizens of Lin'an in 1202 AD, and the citizens of Hangzhou in 2023 AD staged a time-space dialogue between ancient and modern times, reflecting the rapid changes in Hangzhou.

==== Chapter One: "Timeless Grace" ====
Dancers dance on the ink scroll. Then the scenery in the venue changed, showing a scene of lakes and mountains, and traditional skills such as chess, calligraphy and painting were displayed on the side stage. The world cultural heritage Beijing-Hangzhou Grand Canal is also on display.

==== Chapter Two: "Tidal Base of the Quintang River" ====
Makes use of 3D Wia technology, 3D projection, and other high technologies to show the endless Qiantang tide and the charm of sports.

==== Chapter Three: "Together Towards the Future" ====
It displays the ecological beauty of contemporary "green water and green mountains" and the concept of Asian people walking hand in hand. Zhejiang traditional opera and Yue opera were also displayed in this session.

=== Lighting the Cauldron ===
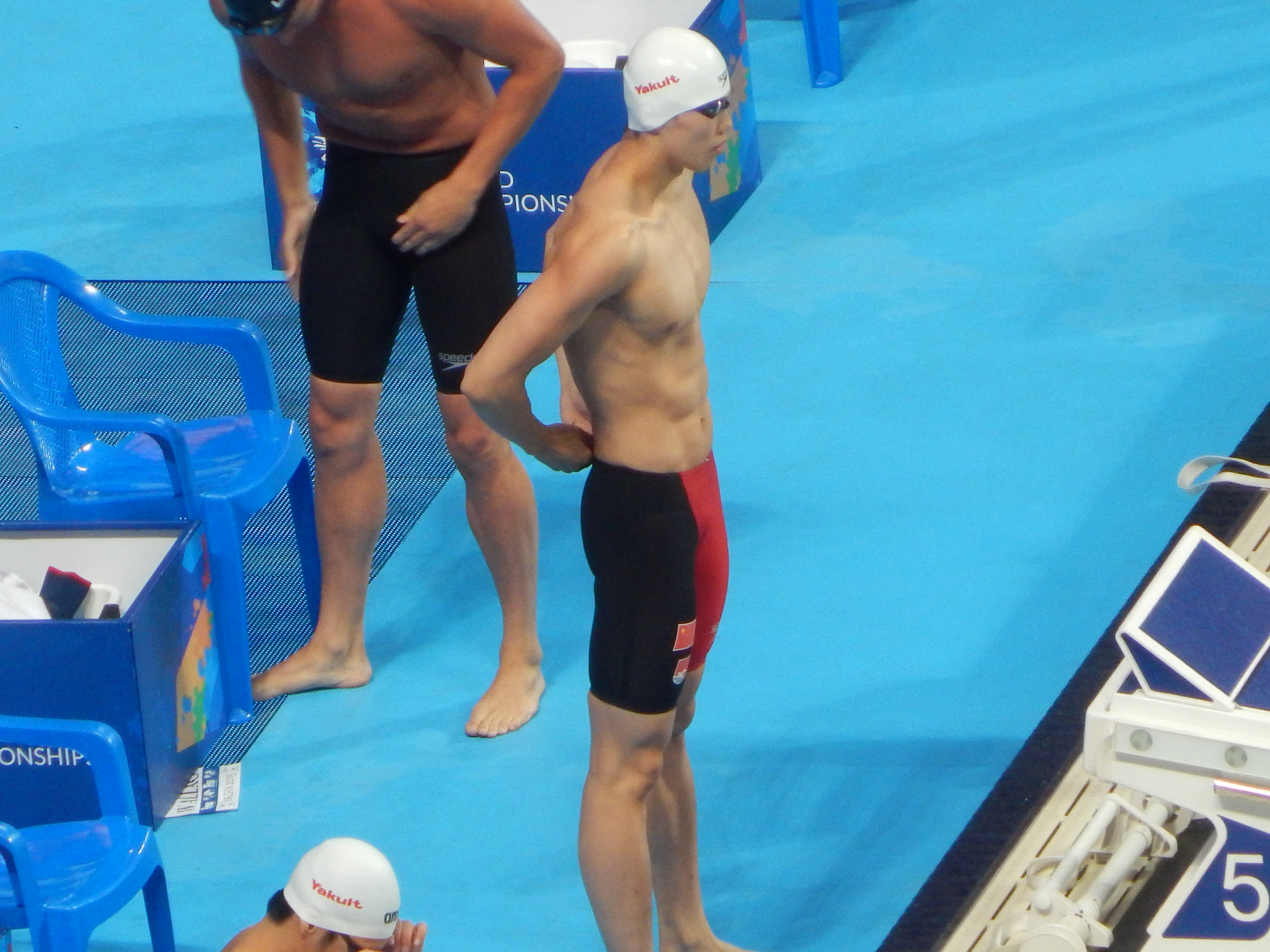
Swimmer Wang Shun lit the main flame.

The last six torchbearers of the opening ceremony were:

- Ye Shiwen: Zhejiang-born swimmer, 2012 Summer Olympics women's 200m medley and women's 400m medley champion, world champion.
- Fan Zhendong: Table tennis player, 2020 Summer Olympics men's table tennis team champion, world champion, ITTF men's singles world number one.
- Xu Mengtao: freestyle ski athlete, freestyle ski aerials gold medal winner at the 2022 Winter Olympics;
- Shi Zhiyong: Zhejiang-born weightlifter, winner of two Olympic weightlifting gold medals At the 2016 and 2020 Summer Olympics.
- Li Lingwei: Badminton player from Zhejiang, who served as Vice Chairman of the Chinese Olympic Committee and member of the International Olympic Committee his after retirement.
- Wang Shun: Zhejiang-born swimmer and the men's 200m medley gold medal winner at the 2020 Summer Olympics.

While the physical torch was being passed on in the venue, the giant "tide waver" representing the 105 million Asian Games Digital Torchbearers of this Asian Games crossed the Qiantang River, rushed to the stadium, and lit up one side of the venue with Wang Shun, the last torch bearer who lit the wave-shaped cauldron. The inspiration came from The main torch device of the Qiantang River tide lights the flame of this Asian Games.

The opening ceremony ended with the theme song "Together with Love Asia".

== Officials and guests ==
=== Host country dignitaries ===
- CCP General Secretary and President of China Xi Jinping
- First Lady of China Peng Liyuan
- Member of the CCP Politburo Standing Committee and Director of the CCP General Office Cai Qi
- Vice Premier of China He Lifeng
- Director of the CCP Office of the Central Foreign Affairs Commission and Minister of Foreign Affairs of China Wang Yi
- State Councilor of China Shen Yiqin
- President of the Chinese Olympic Committee Gao Zhidan
- CCP Secretary of Hangzhou Liu Jie
- Mayor of Hangzhou Yao Gaoyuan
- Executive Secretary-General of the HAGOC and Deputy Mayor of Hangzhou Chen Weiqiang
- CCP Secretary of Zhejiang Province Yi Lianhong
- Governor of Zhejiang Province Wang Hao

=== Foreign dignitaries ===
- Cambodia – King Norodom Sihamoni
- East Timor – Prime Minister Xanana Gusmão (representing President José Ramos-Horta)
- Hong Kong – Chief Executive John Lee Ka-chiu
- Jordan – Prince Faisal bin Hussein (representing King Abdullah II of Jordan)
- Kyrgyzstan – Deputy Prime Minister Edil Baisalov (representing President Sadyr Japarov and Prime Minister Akylbek Japarov)
- Kuwait – Crown Prince Mishal Al-Ahmad Al-Jaber Al-Sabah (representing Emir Nawaf Al-Ahmad Al-Jaber Al-Sabah)
- Macau – Chief Executive Ho Iat Seng
- Malaysia – Speaker of the Dewan Rakyat Johari Abdul (representing King Abdullah of Pahang and Prime Minister Anwar Ibrahim)
- Nepal – Prime Minister Pushpa Kamal Dahal (representing President Ram Chandra Poudel)
- Qatar – Crown Prince Sheikh Joaan (representing Emir Tamim bin Hamad Al Thani)
- South Korea – Prime Minister Han Duck-soo (representing President Yoon Suk Yeol)
- Syria – President Bashar al-Assad
- Chinese Taipei – Former Chairperson of the Kuomintang Hung Hsiu-chu
- Thailand – Princess Sirivannavari (representing King Vajiralongkorn and Prime Minister Srettha Thavisin)

=== International Organizations ===
- (International Olympic Committee) President of the IOC Thomas Bach
- Acting President of the OCA Randhir Singh
- Secretary-General of the United Nations António Guterres
