= Chinese Wrestling Association =

Chinese sports organisation

- 中国摔跤协会
- Abbreviation: CWA
- Formation: 1953
- Type: National sports association
- Headquarters: China
- Members: Member of United World Wrestling (1954–1958; since 1979)
- Parent organization: All-China Sports Federation

The Chinese Wrestling Association (CWA, Chinese: 中国摔跤协会) is a national mass organisation of Chinese wrestling and one of the single sport associations operated under the leadership of the All-China Sports Federation.

== History ==
In 1953, the Chinese Wrestling Association was established. The committee has established a coaching and refereeing committee to facilitate the execution of wrestling, improve the technical level of the sport, and improve the physical fitness of individuals. These committees are responsible for the organisation of coaching and refereeing training courses, the research of wrestling techniques, the organisation of experience exchanges, and the evaluation and review of national-level coaches and referees. In 1954, the Chinese Wrestling Association became a member of the Fédération internationale des luttes associées. It subsequently withdrew in 1958 and re-entered the organisation (now United World Wrestling) in 1979.
