= Duan Shijie =

Chinese sports official

Duan Shijie (Chinese: 段世杰; born 1952, in Jinzhou) is a Chinese sports official.

== Biography ==
After graduating from the Capital University of Physical Education And Sports with a degree in gymnastics, Duan Shijie entered the workforce in September 1969 and subsequently joined the Chinese Communist Party in November 1974. He assumed the roles of vice chairman of the China Athletics Association and director of the Athletics Management Center of the State General Administration of Sports of the People's Republic of China in 1997. He was appointed deputy director of the General Administration of Sports in 1999 and was appointed chairman of the China Athletics Association in 2002. In 2012, he was appointed as the Chinese Communist Party Committee Secretary of the General Administration of Sports of China. He was terminated from his position as deputy director of the General Administration of Sport of China in March 2013.
