= Wu Shaozu =

Chinese politician and military officer (1939–2012)

Wu Shaozu (Chinese: 伍绍祖, April 1939 – September 18, 2012) was a Chinese politician and a major general of the People's Liberation Army.

Wu was born in April 1939 in Leiyang, Hunan, China. After his military service Wu served as Minister of Sports and head of various sporting bodies in China. He died on September 18, 2012, aged 73.

Wu was an important figure in the rehabilitation of qigong's reputation in 1979 (the practice having been criticised and banned in the mid-1960s), along with Qian Xuesen and General Zhang Zhenhuan.

Preceded by Li Menghua	Director General of the Chinese General Administration of Sports; 1988 – 2000	Succeeded by Yuan Weimin
Preceded by He Zhenliang	Chairperson of the Chinese Olympic Committee; 1995 – 1999	Succeeded by Yuan Weimin
Preceded by Li Menghua	Chairperson of the International Wushu Federation; 1995 – 2002	Succeeded by Li Zhijian
