= Li Binghua =

Chinese politician (1942–2024)

Li Binghua (November 1942 – September 26, 2024, Chinese: 李炳华), originally from Guangshan, Henan Province, was a politician in the People's Republic of China.

== Biography ==
Li Binghua held the positions of Mayor of Xicheng District, Beijing, Secretary of the CPC Xicheng District Committee, Vice Chairman of the Beijing Organizing Committee for the Olympic Games, Head of the Personnel Department, and Executive Vice Chairman of the Beijing Organizing Committee for the Olympic Games. He was designated as the chief of the Organization Department of the Beijing Municipal Committee. In January 2009, he was named librarian at the Central Research Institute of Culture and History, and in November 2022, he was promoted to senior librarian. Li Binghua died in Beijing at the age of 82 on the afternoon of September 26, 2024.
