= Tang Xiaoquan =

Chinese politician

Tang Xiaoquan (Chinese: 汤小泉; born May 1947 in Jiangyin) is a Chinese politician.

Tang Xiaoquan has held the positions of director and party secretary of the China Rehabilitation Research Center for Deaf Children, chairman of the executive council of the China Disabled Persons' Federation, and vice-chairman of the Beijing Organizing Committee for the Olympic Games. She was appointed vice-chairman of the fifth presidium of the China Disabled Persons' Federation in November 2008. She was appointed chairman of the board of directors of the China Disabled Persons' Welfare Foundation (Chinese: 中国残疾人福利基金会) in June 2011.
