= Chinese Canoe Association =

Chinese Canoe Association (CCA, Chinese: 中国皮划艇协会) was previously affiliated with the China Boat Sports Association (CBSA) and is headquartered in Beijing. The All-China Sports Federation has jurisdiction over the Association, which is one of the few sports associations. It is a national mass organization that promotes kayaking in China.

== History ==
China was officially admitted as a member of the International Canoe Federation (ICF) in 1974. It was established as an autonomous entity in 1981. International and national competitions are organized by the Chinese Canoe Association, which is also responsible for the development of competition regulations and rules, management systems for coaches and athletes, and the organization of training for coaches, athletes, and referees.
