= Zhang Zhenhuan (general) =

Chinese general and politician

Zhang Zhenhuan (Chinese: 张震寰; 21 October 1915 – 23 March 1994) was a general and political leader in the People's Republic of China. In his retirement, he was the founder and director of the China Qigong Science Research Society (CQRS), and was a notable proponent and defender of qigong during the 1980s and early 1990s.

== Life and government ==
Zhang was from Beijing. In 1935, he was part of a protest of Japanese occupation, the "129 event". In 1938, he joined the Chinese Communist Party. He was a political leader and military officer during the Second Sino-Japanese War and the Chinese Civil War. Later he served as Director of the National Defense Science and Technology Commission of the People's Republic of China and earned the rank of general.

=== Role in qigong milieu ===
Zhang was an advocate for qigong and contributed to the 1979 rehabilitation of the practice (which had been denounced and banned in the mid-1960s). He was one of the four "political pillars" of the qigong sector in China during the 1980s and 1990s. Other important figures in the rehabilitation of qigong included the scientist Qian Xuesen and Sports Minister Wu Shaozu.

Zhang headed, with Qian Xuesen as honorary chairman, the China Somatic Science Society (CSSS), a national association founded in 1987 with the aim to federate the community of researchers working on 'somatic science', i.e. Extraordinary Powers. Around half of the 245 members were professional scientists. At the first meeting of the Society's board of directors Zhang stressed that the Society's establishment was a victory against the adversaries of Extraordinary Powers research:

Since the Sichuan Daily published the story on 'reading with ears' on 11 March 1979, many technological workers from around the country have been engaged in research on the Extraordinary Powers of the human body. For eight years, until the foundation of our Society was authorised, [this research] was not easy. This official authorisation marks a new stage in research on the Extraordinary Powers of the human body. Our organisation has been authorised, but our research work is far from finished. The anchor point of science is practice; the quest of scientific workers is truth. True science has no fear, and no force can stop it. In the past, some people have used their power to criticise research on Extraordinary Powers as 'idealist pseudo-science'. Now that the State Commission for Science and Technology has authorised the establishment of our Somatic Science Research Society, it is not a victory of 'idealism', but it is a victory of true materialism and Marxism, it is a victory of science. In truth, our work is a struggle to defend dialectical materialism, which leads to the victory of the Marxist theory of knowledge, and symbolises the spirit of sacrifice of the quest for scientific truth. ... Qian Xuesen has said: this research will have an effect on the question of the scientific revolution; it can be compared to a second Renaissance;... it has strategic repercussions for the twenty-first century ...

In a speech, Zhang explained that the CQRS would be a "high-level national organisation," which would have the role of controlling qigong's political direction.

On 18 September 1986, he organised a public demonstration of the abilities of qigong Grandmaster Zhang Baosheng for the political and media elite of Guangdong province. Standing next to the Chinese Communist Party Committee Secretary and the Chairman of the municipal Congress of People's Representatives, Zhang Baosheng made chocolate sweets vanish in front of hundreds of officials and journalists, guessed the serial number of a 5-yuan bill, and removed pills from a closed bottle.

Zhang was also behind the popularity of Yan Xin, the most famous of the qigong Grandmasters. As the qigong sector's main political supporter, Zhang introduced Yan into the qigong community where he healed and gave lectures in several cities, collaborating with researchers at Qinghua University in an experiment on external qi, which received sensational media coverage.
