= Ge Jun =

Chinese mathematics professor (born 1964)

- 葛军
- Born: October 1964 (age 61); Nantong, Jiangsu
- Occupations: Associate professor and master instructor
- Employer(s): College of Mathematics and Computer Science, Nanjing Normal University

Ge Jun (simplified Chinese: 葛军; traditional Chinese: 葛軍; pinyin: Gě Jūn; born in October 1964 in Nantong, Jiangsu) is the associate professor and master instructor of College of Mathematics and Computer Science of Nanjing Normal University. Ge took part in the composing and designing process of the mathematics paper of the National College Entrance Examination for several times. The papers of the year 2003, 2010 and 2012 were regarded as "extremely difficult" by examinees. As a result, he is called "the Emperor of Mathematics" (Chinese: 数学帝) by netizens in China. Some media also use this nickname.

== Composing of the mathematics papers ==
The 2003 mathematics examination paper composed by Ge Jun averaged only 68 (out of 150). Some teachers, students and parents believed that the paper of 2010 was more difficult than that of 2003 but actually the average score was 83 (out of 160). In 2012, he joined the composing process of the mathematics paper following the new curriculum standard and the paper was once more considered difficult by examinees.

Since 2011, whenever a difficult mathematics examination paper occurs in China, its composers will be human flesh searched by netizens. Ge was supposed to participate in the composing process of 2011 college entrance examination in Guangdong Province. The Guangdong Provincial Education Examination Authority denied the rumors later. According to the report of Modern Express, Ge Jun himself claimed that he did not participate in the work of Jiangsu or Guangdong.

Evaluations of the mathematics papers of college entrance examination composed by Ge Jun were mixed. For instance, experts believe that the paper was innovative, differentiated, and appropriate while many students and their parents were apparently dissatisfied because of the low marks examinees received. Professor Tu Rongbao (Chinese: 涂荣豹), an expert of the go-over group of mathematics entrance paper of Jiangsu believed the 2010 paper to have a wide coverage of knowledge, to meet the requirements of the exam instructions and to contain a lot of innovations.

== Academic areas ==
Ge Jun mainly engaged in mathematics competitions, teaching theory of mathematics curriculum, network curriculum, school education and research. He has published more than 60 papers and edited more than 30 textbooks and works.

Ge Jun is the senior coach of Chinese Mathematical Olympiad, deputy director of the Centre for Teacher Training in Colleges and Universities of Jiangsu Province, executive director of Primary and Secondary School Science and Technology Education Association of Jiangsu Province, vice chairman of the Council of Mathematics Teaching in Middle Schools of Jiangsu Province, general secretary of Nanjing Institute of Mathematics.

Ge is currently the vice president of the College of teacher education of Nanjing Normal University. His main fields of research include methodology of mathematical thought, teaching theory of mathematics, curriculum evaluation, education of mathematics, mathematical problem solving and mathematical communication.

On 16 November 2012, Ge Jun took office as president of High School Affiliated to Nanjing Normal University. He is in charge of school administration, alumni and senior three students.
