= Chinese Judo Association =

Sports governing body in China

The Chinese Judo Association (CJA, Chinese: 中国柔道协会) is a national sports organization that operates under the All-China Sports Federation as a single-sport association.

== History ==
The China Judo Association was established on December 27, 1979. The Association is a nationwide, non-profit organization dedicated to advancing the growth, popularization, and technical proficiency of judo.
