= Liu Peng (politician) =

Chinese politician

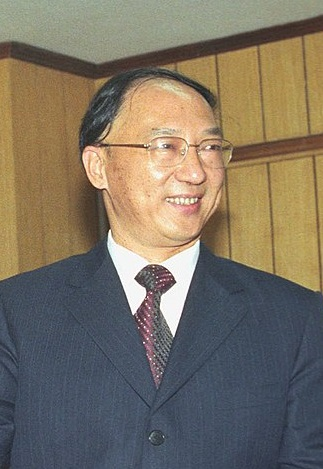
Liu Peng

Liu Peng (Chinese: 刘鹏; born September 1951) is a Chinese Communist Party politician, who most recently served as director of the State General Administration of Sports.

== Biography ==
Born in Chongqing, he studied mechanical engineering at Chongqing University and has a graduate degree from Xi'an Jiaotong University. He was a rusticated youth in Neijiang County during the Cultural Revolution. After the Cultural Revolution ended, he was a factory worker at Chongqing Steel Company. He joined the Chinese Communist Party (CCP) in May 1979. By 1985 he joined the prefecture-level standing committee of Chongqing, then a city under Sichuan province. He was then head of the provincial Communist Youth League organization in Sichuan. In 1991 he became chief commissioner (mayor equivalent) of Yibin. In 1993 he was promoted to the Secretariat of the Communist Youth League, and head of the China Youth Association. In 1997 he became deputy head of the CCP Central Publicity Department, and a member of the Central Public Security Comprehensive Management Commission. In April 2002 he became deputy party chief of Sichuan Provincial Committee of the Chinese Communist Party.

In December 2004 he took on the job of the director of the State General Administration of Sports. In February 2005 he was named head of the China Olympic Committee. In November 2016, he was appointed as a member of the 12th National Committee of the Chinese People's Political Consultative Conference (CPPCC) and held the position of deputy director of the Foreign Affairs Committee of the 12th National Committee of the CPPCC.

Liu was an alternate of the 16th Central Committee of the Chinese Communist Party, and a full member of the 17th and 18th Central Committees.

Government offices
Preceded by Yuan Weimin	Secretary of National Sports Administration; December 2004-November 2016	Next: Gou Zhongwen
Previous: Zhou Chengmei	Administrative Office Commissioner of Yibin District, Sichuan Province; August 1991-May 1993	Next: Zhou Jiyao
Previous: Yuan Weimin	President of the Olympic Committee of China; February 2005-December 2016	Next: Gou Zhongwen
Previous: Zhang Baoshun	President of All-China Youth Federation; December 1993-January 1998	Next: Bayanqolu
Party political offices
Previous: Wang Sanyun	Deputy Secretary of CCP Sichuan Provincial Committee; April 2002-December 2004	Next: Jiang Jufeng
