= Canadian Global Almanac =

Canadian reference book

Canadian Global Almanac

The Canadian Global Almanac is a Canadian reference book containing a large collection of facts and statistics. It grew out of the American World Almanac and Book of Facts when in 1986 an all-Canadian version was published, edited by John Filion and published by Susan Yates. John Robert Columbo later became its editor. While it was being published, a new edition was released each year in November. The almanac has not been published since 2005.
