= Chinese Communist Party Deputy Committee Secretary =

Official position in the Chinese Communist Party

- Traditional Chinese: 黨委副書記
- Simplified Chinese: 党委副书记
Transcriptions
Standard Mandarin
- Hanyu Pinyin: dǎngwěi fùshūjì

In the People's Republic of China, a Deputy Party Committee Secretary (simplified Chinese: 党委副书记; traditional Chinese: 黨委副書記; pinyin: dǎngwěi fùshūjì; also translated as Deputy Party Secretary, deputy party chief, vice party chief) serves as the lieutenant to the Chinese Communist Party Committee Secretary, and thus the deputy leader of the party committee, ranked immediately after the party chief. The term is also use for leadership positions of CCP organizations in state-owned enterprises, private companies, foreign-owned companies, universities, hospitals, as well as other institutions of the state.

In most administrative jurisdictions, there are two deputy party chiefs. The first-ranked deputy party chief is also the head of government of that jurisdiction. The second-ranked deputy party chief assists the party chief primarily in party affairs.

For example, in a province, the party chief is in charge of the overall work of the party committee, and in practice also determines the broad direction of government policy. However, the policies are then implemented and carried out by the provincial governor through specific measures, and it is the governor's job to oversee the details of the implementation. The governor is always concurrently the first-ranked Deputy Party Secretary. The second-ranked Deputy Secretary is also called zhuanzhi fushuji (专职副书记; lit., "full time deputy secretary") or, more rarely changwu fushuji (常务副书记; i.e., "executive deputy secretary").

The zhuanzhi deputy party chief is mainly in charge of party affairs; that is, keeping the party organization in line, spearheading party initiatives such as education campaigns and ideological indoctrination campaigns, and overseeing the work of the Party School in their area of jurisdiction. For example, since the 1990s, a provincial deputy party chief is almost always concurrently the head of the provincial Party School.

The zhuanzhi deputy party chief is an office that carries significant weight. Although administratively, they are half a level below the party chief and head of government (for example, a deputy provincial party chief is ranked at the sub-provincial level), they generally are seen as likely candidates to ascend to the position of head of government (and potentially, ascend even higher to party chief). Examples of this include Zhejiang governor Li Qiang, and Gansu governor Liu Weiping.

== Notable provincial deputy party chiefs ==
- Li Chuncheng
- Lü Xiwen
- Qiu He
- Zhao Yong
- Shohrat Zakir

== See also ==
- Chinese Communist Party Committee Secretary
- Provincial party standing committee
