= Gao Zhidan =

Chinese politician

- 高志丹
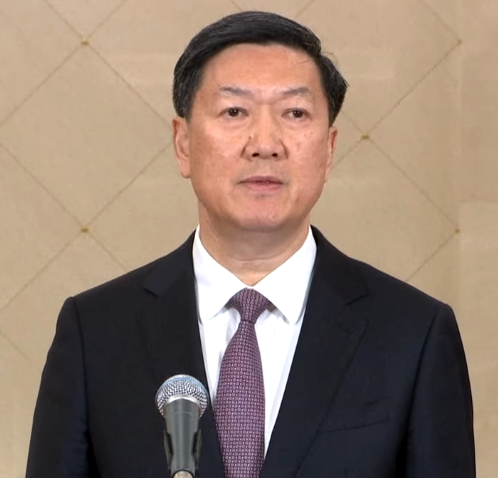
- Gao in 2026

Director of the State General Administration of Sports
- Incumbent
- Assumed office 29 July 2022
- Premier: Li Keqiang; Li Qiang
- Preceded by: Gou Zhongwen

Personal details
- Born: January 1963 (age 63) Siping, Jilin, China
- Party: Chinese Communist Party
- Education: Beijing Sport University

Gao Zhidan (Chinese: 高志丹; pinyin: Gāo Zhìdān; born January 1963) is a Chinese politician who is the current director of the State General Administration of Sports, in office since July 2022.

== Biography ==
Gao was born in Siping, Jilin, in January 1963. After graduating from Beijing Sport University in 1988, he was assigned to the State General Administration of Sports. He moved up the ranks to become assistant director in May 2015 and deputy director in June 2016. On 29 July 2022, he rose to become director, succeeding Gou Zhongwen. On November 16, 2023, Gao was elected as the president of the International Wushu Federation, also succeeding Gou Zhongwen.

Government offices
Preceded by Gou Zhongwen	Director of the State General Administration of Sports; 2022–present	Incumbent
Political offices
Preceded by Gou Zhongwen	Chairman of the All-China Sports Federation; 2016–2022	Incumbent
Preceded by Gou Zhongwen	President of the Chinese Olympic Committee; 2016–2022	Incumbent
