= Chinese Gymnastics Association =

Sports governing body in China

The Chinese Gymnastics Association (CGA, Chinese: 中国体操协会; pinyin: Zhōngguó tǐcāo xiéhuì), is a national mass sports organization and group member of the All-China Sports Federation. CGA is the sole legal organization representing China to participate in international and Asian gymnastics organizations.

== History ==
Founded in 1956, the Chinese Gymnastics Association (CGA) first affiliated with the Fédération Internationale de Gymnastique (FIG) in August of the same year; in 1964 the CGA left the FIG because of discontent with its conspiracy to establish the so-called "two Chinas," and in October 1978 the FIG restored the CGA's legal seat. CGA is responsible for conducting scientific research and organizing international and domestic technical research in gymnastics.
