= General Administration of Sport of China =

Government agency in China

General Administration of Sport
- 国家体育总局
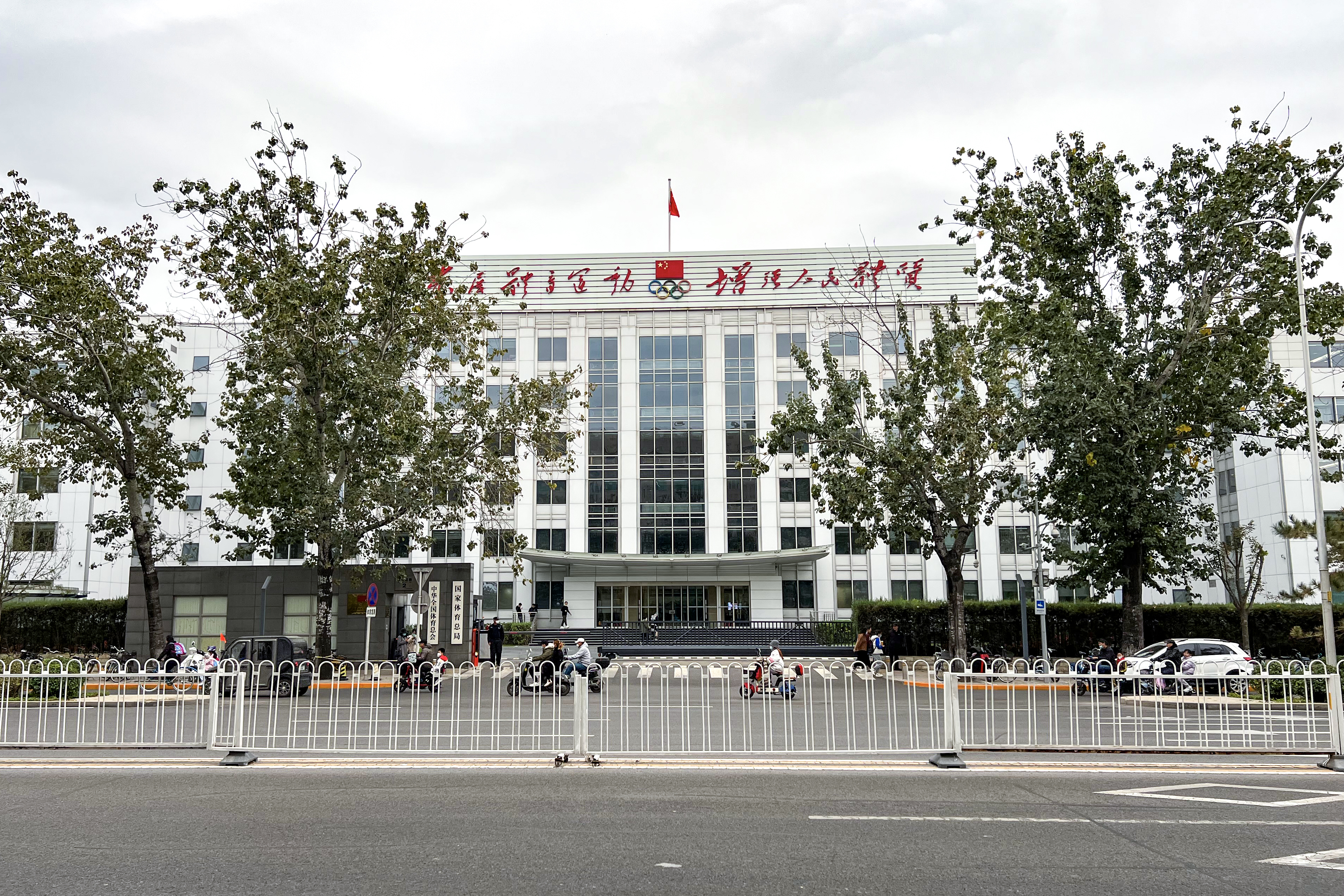
- Headquarters in 2022

Agency overview
- Formed: 1952; 74 years ago
- Jurisdiction: China
- Headquarters: 2 Tiyuguan Road, Dongcheng District, Beijing
- Agency executive: Gao Zhidan, Director
- Parent agency: State Council
- Website: www.sport.gov.cn

General Administration of Sport of China
- Simplified Chinese: 国家体育总局
- Traditional Chinese: 國家體育總局
- Literal meaning: National Sports General Administration
Transcriptions
Standard Mandarin
- Hanyu Pinyin: Guójiā Tǐyù Zǒngjú

The General Administration of Sport is the government agency responsible for sports in China. It is subordinate to the State Council. It also administers the All-China Sports Federation and Chinese Olympic Committee.

The agency is currently led by minister Gao Zhidan.

== History ==
In the 1950s, the State Physical Culture and Sports Commission under General He Long conducted sports exchanges with the Soviet Union and eastern Europe.

During the Cultural Revolution, in 1966, China's national teams stopped training and withdrew from all international events.

In 1968, the commission was placed under the People's Liberation Army and General Lin Biao.

In 1970, China's national teams began competing again. The first major international event a Chinese team participated in since 1966 was the World Table Tennis Championship in Nagoya, Japan, which ultimately led to the ping-pong diplomacy with the United States.

In 1972, the commission was removed from PLA control. The commission was tasked with facilitating sports diplomacy. In 1974, it exchanged 172 groups of 3,200 athletes with eighty other countries, most of them in the Third World.

During the Deng era, the government increased its emphasis on winning international sporting competitions as part of its idea for a strong and more internationally-engaged in China. The State Sports Commission issued its "Olympic Model" in 1979, instructing each province to channel its sports programs toward the overall goal of winning in the Olympic games. In 1980, it issued the slogan "Break out of Asia, advance on the world" in an effort to spur China's participation in international sports.

In June 2017, due to improper "re-accommodation" of the chief coach Guoliang Liu, 4 players and 2 coaches in Chinese National Table Tennis Team declared to leave the 2017 ITTF World Tour Chinese Open.

== List of directors ==
Name	Chinese name	Took office	Left office	Ref.
He Long	贺龙	November 1952	January 1968	
Cao Cheng	曹诚	1968	1971	
Wang Meng	王猛	July 1971	December 1974	
Zhuang Zedong	庄则栋	December 1974	February 1977	
Wang Meng	王猛	February 1977	August 1981	
Li Menghua	李梦华	August 1981	December 1988	
Wu Shaozu	伍绍祖	December 1988	April 2000	
Yuan Weimin	袁伟民	April 2000	December 2004	
Liu Peng	刘鹏	December 2004	November 2016	
Gou Zhongwen	苟仲文	November 2016	July 2022	
Gao Zhidan	高志丹	29 July 2022	present	

== See also ==
- Chinese sportspeople
- China at the Olympics
- China at the Paralympics
- Sport in Hong Kong
- Culture of China
- National Games of China
- National Peasants' Games
- 2008 Summer Olympics
