= Chinese Olympic Committee =

- Country: People's Republic of China
- Code: CHN
- Created: 1949
- Recognized: 1954, then 1979
- Continental Association: OCA
- Headquarters: Dongcheng, Beijing, China
- President: Gao Zhidan
- Secretary General: Song Keqin
- Website: www.olympic.cn

Chinese Olympic Committee
- Simplified Chinese: 中国奥林匹克委员会
- Traditional Chinese: 中國奧林匹克委員會
Transcriptions
Standard Mandarin
- Hanyu Pinyin: Zhōngguó Àolínpǐkè Wěiyuánhuì
- Wade–Giles: Chung-Kuo Ao-Lin-P'i-K'o Wei-Yüan-Hui

Abbreviation
- Simplified Chinese: 中国奥委会
- Traditional Chinese: 中國奧委會
Transcriptions
Standard Mandarin
- Hanyu Pinyin: Zhōngguó Àowěihuì
- Wade–Giles: Chung-Kuo Ao-Wei-Hui

Commercial logo of the Chinese Olympic Committee

The Chinese Olympic Committee (COC; 中国奥林匹克委员会; IOC code: CHN) is the National Olympic Committee of the People's Republic of China. It is headquartered in Dongcheng, Beijing, China.

== History ==
On 1 October 1949, the People's Republic of China was founded, and the Central Committee of the Communist Youth League of China assumed responsibility for national sports affairs. On 26 October 1949, the National Congress of Sports Workers convened in Beijing and decided to establish the All-China Sports Federation (ACSF) as a non-governmental sports organization.

In 1952, the PRC's team was invited to the Olympics for the first time, during the 1952 Summer Olympics in Helsinki, Finland. Only one athlete, Wu Chuanyu, a swimmer, was able to participate, given that the Committee "was accepted for affiliation a mere two days before the opening of the Games".

In 1954, the International Olympic Committee (IOC) adopts a resolution officially recognizing the PRC's NOC as "Comite Olympique de la Republique Populaire Chinoise". At the same time, it continues to recognize the China National Amateur Athletic Federation (CNAAF) of the Republic of China as the "Chinese Olympic Committee, National Amateur Athletic Federation". The PRC was invited to the 1956 Melbourne Olympics, and thus organizes a delegation, but withdraws in protest of the two China's issue;

On 19 August 1958, due to dissatisfaction with the IOC, the ACSF announced a break with the IOC and unilaterally withdrew from eight international sports organizations, resulting in its expulsion from the international sports arena.

In 1978, the State Council approved the separation of the ACSF and its Olympic Committee into two independent legal entities, forming one organization with two names.

On October 25, 1979, the IOC through a postal vote, passed the Nagoya Resolution by 62 votes to 17, amending the earlier Montevideo Resolution. The resolution: (1) recognized the Olympic Committee of the People's Republic of China under the name "Chinese Olympic Committee", permitting the use of the PRC flag and the anthem; (2) recognized the Olympic Committee located in Taipei as the "Chinese Taipei Olympic Committee", on the condition that its flag and anthem different from those of the Republic of China.

On November 26, 1979, the Nagoya Resolution was formally adopted, allowing the People's Republic of China to participate under the name "Chinese Olympic Committee" (COC, 中国奥林匹克委员会). The Taipei-based committee amended its flag and anthem and adopted the name "Chinese Taipei Olympic Committee" to remain within the IOC. Afterward, the COC became organizationally separate from the ACSF, and in 1989, after each held independent congresses, their administrative operations were officially separated as well.

In September 1993, Beijing's first bid to host the Olympic Games was unsuccessful.

In July 2001, Beijing submitted a second bid. On July 13, at the 112th IOC Session in Moscow, Beijing was awarded the right to host the 29th Summer Olympic Games in 2008.

In July 2015, Beijing launched a third bid. On July 31, at the 128th IOC Session in Kuala Lumpur, Beijing was selected to host the 24th Winter Olympic Games in 2022.

== See also ==
- China at the Olympics
- China at the Asian Games
- List of current leaders of the Chinese Olympic Committee
- Sports Federation and Olympic Committee of Hong Kong, China
- Macau Sports and Olympic Committee
- Chinese Taipei Olympic Committee
