= All-China Sports Federation =

National sport organization

The All-China Sports Federation (simplified Chinese: 中华全国体育总会; traditional Chinese: 中華全國體育總會) is a national people's organization in China that oversees a wide array of sports associations across the country.

It is responsible to the General Administration of Sport of China and the Ministry of Civil Affairs.

== See also ==
- Chinese Olympic Committee
