= List of Chinese flags =

This is a list of flags of entities named or related to "China".

== People's Republic of China ==
=== National flags ===
Flag	Duration	Use	Description
	1 October 1949 – present	Flag of the People's Republic of China	A red field, with a large gold star with four smaller stars towards the fly at the canton. This flag is flown in mainland China, Hong Kong, and Macau.

=== Special administrative regions flags ===
Flag	Duration	Use	Description
	1 July 1997 – present	Flag of Hong Kong	On a red field, a white stylised Bauhinia blakeana flower. Each of the five petals bears a red five pointed star. The red field and red stars echo Hong Kong's connection to the mainland and the flower represents the harmony of the unique identity of the region.
	20 December 1999 – present	Flag of Macau	On a green field, a lotus flower above a stylized bridge and water in white, beneath an arc of five gold, five-pointed stars.

=== Military flags ===
Flag	Duration	Use	Description
	1948–present	Flag of the People's Liberation Army	A red field with a yellow star at the canton, and the Chinese numerals for "8" and "1", the date of the PLA's establishment on 1 August 1927.
	1992–present	Ensign of the People's Liberation Army Ground Force	The PLA flag with a green stripe at the bottom, representing the ground.
	1950s	Jack of the People's Liberation Army Navy	A red flag with the PLA emblem and a horizontal blue stripe in the center.
	1992–present	Ensign of the People's Liberation Army Navy	The PLA flag with five horizontal lines at the bottom, three blue and two white, representing the sea.
	1992–present	Ensign of the People's Liberation Army Air Force	The PLA flag with a blue stripe at the bottom, representing the sky.
	2016–present	Ensign of the People's Liberation Army Rocket Force	The PLA flag with a gold yellow stripe at the bottom, representing the flare of missile launching.
	2018–present	Flag of the People's Armed Police Force	The PLA flag with three green bars at the bottom.
	2024–present	Flag of the People's Liberation Army Aerospace Force	The PLA flag with five horizontal lines at the bottom, three blue and two yellow.
	2024–present	Flag of the People's Liberation Army Cyberspace Force	The PLA flag with five horizontal lines at the bottom, three gray and two yellow.
	2024–present	Flag of the People's Liberation Army Information Support Force	The PLA flag with five horizontal lines at the bottom, three purple and two yellow.
	2024–present	Flag of the People's Liberation Army Joint Logistics Support Force	The PLA flag with five horizontal lines at the bottom, three green and two yellow.

=== Civil flags ===
Flag	Duration	Use	Description
	1949–present	Flags of the Young Pioneers of China	Red flag with a yellow five-pointed star and torch in the middle.
	1922–present	Flag of the Communist Youth League of China	Red flag with encircled yellow five-pointed star in the canton.
	1950s–present	Flag of the Customs of the People's Republic of China	The flag of the People's Republic of China with a caduceus crossed with a golden key added to the lower fly.
	2018–present	Flag of the China Fire and Rescue Service	Horizontal bicolor flag in red and blue with the badge of the China Fire and Rescue Service at the top and the Chinese and English text "Flag of China Fire and Rescue" at the bottom.
	2020–present	Flag of the People's Police of the People's Republic of China	Red flag with a blue stripe in the bottom and the badge of the People's Police in the canton.
	?–present	Flag of the China Maritime Safety Administration	
	2021–present	Flag of the National Immigration Administration of China	Red flag with the organization's logo in the center and a blue crenellated wall at the bottom.
	1945–1979	Flag of Inner-Mongolian Autonomous Government	A red five-pointed star above a hoe and a horse pole that are crossed, symbolizing the unity of farmers and herdsmen in Inner Mongolia under the Chinese Communist Party.

=== City flags ===
Flag	Duration	Use	Description
	1997	Flag of Ningbo	
	1988–1997	Flag of Nanjing	
	2006–present	Flag of Kaifeng	
	2009–present	Flag of Shangrao	

=== Political flags ===
Flag	Duration	Use	Description
	1996–present	Flag of the Chinese Communist Party	A red flag with the golden emblem of the Chinese Communist Party.
	1921–1996	Flag of the Chinese Communist Party	A red flag with the golden emblem of the Chinese Communist Party.
	1927–1964	Flag of the Chinese Peasants' Association	The Plough flag, a yellow plough on a red field.
	1925–1953	Flag of the China Party for Public Interest	A red field with a stylized white "井" in a blue canton.

==== Flags of Political Groups and Separatist Movements ====
Flag	Duration	Use	Description
	2008–2009	Flag of the Maoist Communist Party of China	Red flag featuring a portrait of young Mao Zedong in the upper hoist.
	1989	Flag of the Beijing Students' Autonomous Federation	A flag created by students present during the 1989 Tiananmen Square Protests.
	1997–present	Flag of the Inner Mongolian People's Party	
	1959–present	Flag of the Central Tibetan Administration	Same as the previous flag of Tibet.
	1933–present	The Kök Bayraq, flag of the East Turkestan independence movement	First adopted as the flag of the First East Turkestan Republic (1933–1934). Now also used by the East Turkistan Government-in-Exile.
	1988–present	Flags of the Turkistan Islamic Party	

=== Proposed national flags of the People's Republic of China ===
In July 1949, a contest was announced for a national flag for the newly founded People's Republic of China (PRC). From a total of about 3,000 proposed designs, 38 finalists were chosen. In September, the current flag, submitted by Zeng Liansong, was officially adopted, with the hammer and sickle removed.

==== Alternative proposals ====
Zeng Liansong's original proposal for the PRC flag

Mao Zedong's proposal for the PRC flag symbolizing the Yellow River

Proposal 2 for the PRC flag symbolizing the Yellow River and the Yangtze River

Proposal 3 for the PRC flag symbolizing the Yellow River, the Yangtze River and the Pearl River

Proposal 4 for the PRC flag

==== Selection of proposals ====
Design by Ai Qing

Design by Bao Qiquan

Design by Chen Duo

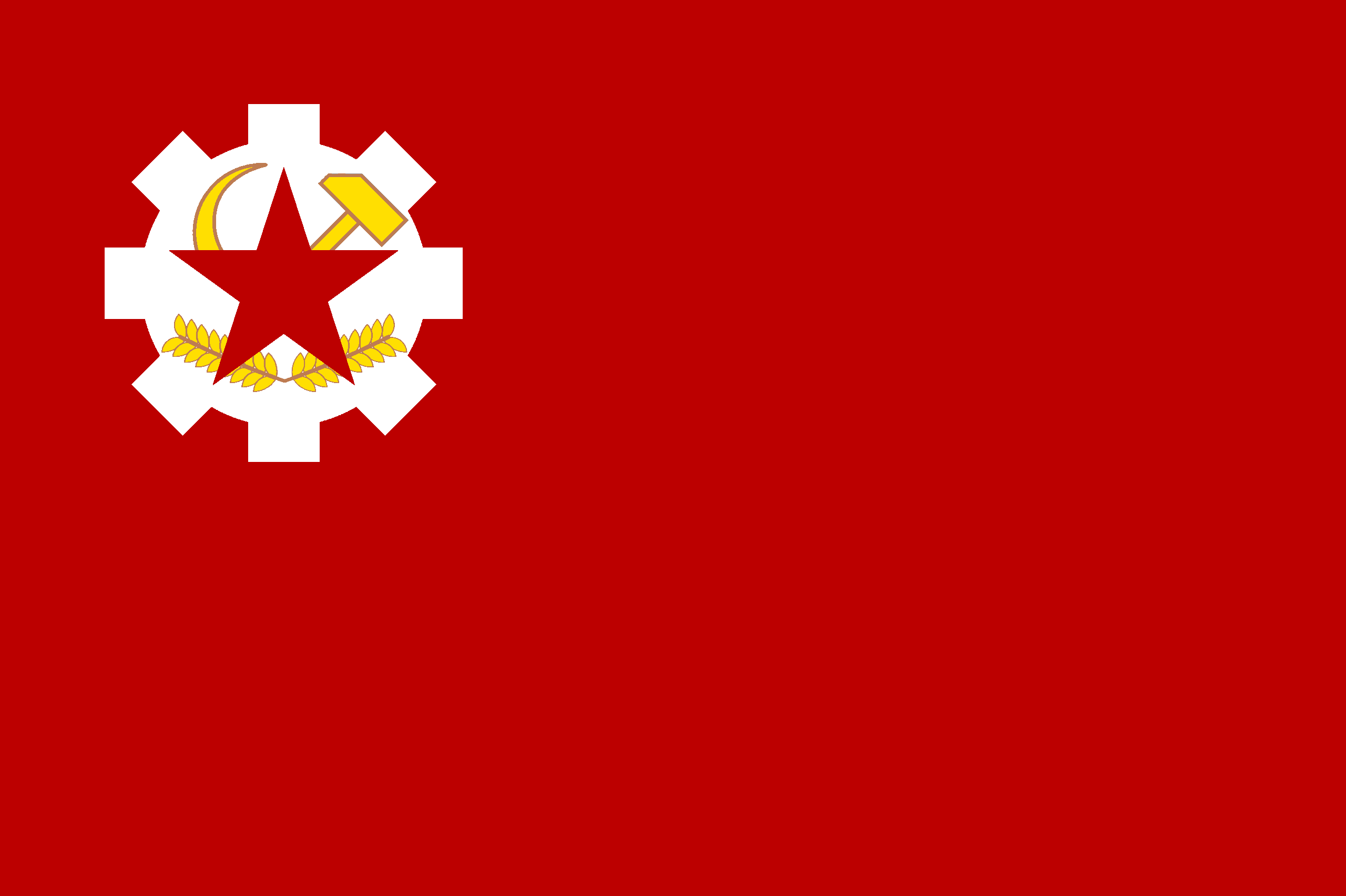
Design by Chen Lu

Design by Guo Moruo

Design by Guo Moruo

Design by Hu Yuanqing

Design by Jiang Dazhong

Design by Kang Jian

Design by Liang Congjie

Design by Luo Wen

Design by Mo Hongshu

Design by Mo Zongjiang

Design by Pang Xunqin

Design by Wu Yuzhang

Design by Wu Yuzhang

Design by Xiao Shufang

Design by Xiao Shufang

Design by Xiao Shuhua

Design by Xiao Shuhua

Design by Yan Xinghua

Design by Yang Taiyang

Design by Yang Taiyang

Design by Yu Zhuosheng

Design by Zhang Ding and Zhong Ling

Design by Zhang Ding and Zhong Ling

Design by Zhang Ding and Zhong Ling

Design by Zhang Ding and Zhong Ling

Design by Zhang Ding and Zhong Ling

Design by Zhang Ding, Zhong Ling and Zhou Guangyuan

Design by Zhang Ding, Zhong Ling and Zhou Guangyuan

Design by Zhang Ding, Zhong Ling, Zhou Guangyuan and Xiao Shuhua

Design by Zhu De

=== House flags ===
Flag	Duration	Use	Description
	1984–present	House flag of China Merchants Group	
	1951–1984	House flag of China Merchants Group	
	1960–1993	House flag of COSCO	

=== Historical socialist states ===
Flag	Duration	Use	Description
	1931–34	Flag used in the Minxi Soviet Government	A red field with a white star and black hammer and sickle in the upper hoist corner.
	1931–34	Jiangxi Soviet republic flag	A red star and hammer and sickle along with Chinese characters for "Chinese Communists" (Zhonggong, 中共) written in classical word order, i.e., read from the right.
	1931–34	Flag of the Chinese Soviet Republic	Red flag with the national emblem in the center.
	1933–34	Flag of the Fujian People's Government	A horizontal bicolour of red and blue and charged with a yellow five-pointed star in the center.
	1928–41	Flag used in the Qiongya Soviet Government	

==== Historical military flags ====
Flag	Duration	Use	Description
	1931	Flag of the Northeast Righteous and Brave Army	Red flag with the text "東北義勇軍" and a star.
		Flag of the Third Army of the Shandong People's Anti-Japanese Salvation Army	
	1927–1928	Flag of the Chinese Workers' and Peasants' Red Army	Same as the 1928 version, but the hoist side reads "工農革命軍" (China Workers'/Peasants' Revolutionary Army). Divisions were added, for example "第二軍第一師" (Second Army, 1st Division).
	1928–1930	Flag of the Chinese Workers' and Peasants' Red Army	Hoist side reads "中國工農紅軍" (Chinese Workers' and Peasants' Red Army).
	1930	Flag of the Chinese Workers' and Peasants' Red Army	Same as the 1928 version, but the hoist side has no characters and the top reads "全世界無產階級聯合起來" ("Proletariats of the world, unite!").
	1930–1931	Flag of the Chinese Workers' and Peasants' Red Army	Same as April 1930 version but top reads "全世界無產階級及被壓迫民族聯合起來" ("Proletariats and oppressed peoples of the world, unite!").
	1931–1934	Flag of the Chinese Workers' and Peasants' Red Army	Same as 1934 version but with blank white hoist side and colored fringe around the edges (six variants – red for infantry, yellow for cavalry, black for artillery, white for engineering, blue for logistics, green for medical).
	1934–1937	Flag of the Chinese Workers' and Peasants' Red Army	
	1937–1947	Flag of the Eighth Route Army (18th Group Army) in use by communist forces in the Second United Front during the Second Sino Japanese War	National Revolutionary Army unit flag with text "國民革命軍第十八集團軍" (National Revolutionary Army 18th Group Army) on the hoist side.

== Republic of China ==
=== National flags ===
Flag	Duration	Use	Description
	28 October 1928 – present	Flag of the Republic of China (Commonly known as "Taiwan")	A red field, with a blue canton containing a twelve-ray white sun. This flag flew over mainland China until 1949, and is presently flown on the island of Taiwan and other islands under the control of the ROC.
	1950–present	Flag of the Republic of China (vertical)	The reverse side, rotated to put the blue canton in the upper left.
	1940–1943	Flag of the Reorganized National Government of the Republic of China	Used by the Japanese puppet rebel government until 1943 when the pennant was removed and the regular ROC flag took its place. The pennant reads "Peace, Anti-Communism, National Construction".
	1940–1943	Flag of the Reorganized National Government of the Republic of China	Used by the Japanese puppet rebel government until 1943 when the pennant was removed and the regular ROC flag took its place. The pennant reads "Peace, Anti-Communism".
	1940–1943	Flag of the Reorganized National Government of the Republic of China	Used by the Japanese puppet rebel government until 1943 when the pennant was removed and the regular ROC flag took its place. The pennant reads "Peace, National Construction".
	1912–1928	First flag of the Republic of China, or "Five-colored flag"	It was widely flown even before the Republic of China in Shanghai and eastern parts of north China until 1928. The stripe representation: red for Han Chinese, yellow for Manchus, blue for Mongols, white for Hui, and black for Tibetans. Later used by the Japanese puppet states of the East Hebei Autonomous Government, the Chinese Provisional Government, and the Reformed Government.
	1915–1916	Flag of the Empire of China	The version with the red saltire was more commonly used than the version with the red centered cross.
	1916	Variant flag of the Empire of China	The version with the red saltire was more commonly used than the version with the red centered cross.

==== Regional government flags ====
Flag	Duration	Use	Description
	1911–1912	Flag of the Great Han Sichuan Military Government.	
	1911–1912	Bagua flag of the Shanxi Provincial Military Government^{zh}	

=== Standards ===
==== Head of state ====
Flag	Duration	Use	Description
	1988–present	Standard of the president of the Republic of China	
	1929–1988	Old standard of the president of the Republic of China	
	1927–1928	Commander-in-chief flag of the Republic of China (Beiyang government)	

==== Vice president ====
Flag	Duration	Use	Description
	1947–1986	Standard of the Vice President of the Republic of China	Abolished with the Act of Ensign of the Republic of China Navy (海軍旗章條例) on 3 January 1986.

==== Other high executive officials ====
Flag	Duration	Use	Description
	1929–2003	A common flag for all ROC high executive officials	

=== Military flags ===
Flag	Duration	Use	Description
	1986–present	Flag of the Chief of the General Staff (Republic of China Armed Forces)	
	1924–present	Flag of the Republic of China Military Police	
	1945–present	Flag of the Republic of China Armed Forces Reserve	
	1946–2012	Flag of the Republic of China Joint Logistics Command	
	1945–1992	Flag of the Taiwan Garrison Command	

==== Army ====
Flag	Duration	Use	Description
	1924–present	Flag of the Republic of China Army (formerly the National Revolutionary Army)	The national emblem with a thick red border.
		Flag of the Army commander	
		Senior general's flag	
		General's flag	
		Lieutenant general's flag	
		Major general's flag	
		Colonel's flag	
	1911–1928	Army flag of the Republic of China (Note: Flag of the Wuchang uprising.)	The banner of the Wuchang uprising of 10 October 1911, subsequently used as the flag of the army of the Republic of China, c. 1913–28.

==== Navy ====
Flag	Duration	Use	Description
Naval ensign
	1912–present	Ensign of the Republic of China Navy	
	1942–1945	Ensign of the Reorganized National Government of the Republic of China.	Used by the Japanese puppet government from 1 May 1942 until the end of the regime.
	1911	First naval ensign of the Republic of China	
Naval jack
	1928–present	Naval jack of the Republic of China Navy	Identical to the Kuomintang flag (see below).
	1940–1945	Naval jack of Reorganized National Government of the Republic of China	Used by the Japanese puppet government from 1940 until the end of the regime. The pennant reads "Kuomintang".
	1912–1928	Naval jack of the Republic of China Navy	
Rank flags
		Commanding general of Navy flag	
	1912–	Senior admiral's flag	
	1912–	Admiral's flag	
	1912–	Vice admiral's flag	
	1912–	Rear admiral's flag	
		Captain's flag	
	1912–	Flag of the Bordered Blue Banner of the Eight Banners	
	1924–	Battle fleet leader's pennant	
	1962–	Navigating battle ship pennant	
	1924–	Commission pennant	
	1912–	Duty pennant	
	1986–	ROCN unit flag	

==== Air Force ====
Flag	Duration	Use	Description
	1981–present	Flag of the Republic of China Air Force	
	1948–1981	Flag of the Republic of China Air Force	
	1937–1948	Flag of the Republic of China Air Force	
		Commanding general of Air Force flag	
		Senior general's flag	
		General's flag	
		Lieutenant general's flag	
		Major general's flag	
		Colonel's flag	
	1986–present	Air force units flag model	
	1981–1986	Air force units flag model	
	1962–1981	Air force units flag model	
	1958–1962	Air force units flag model	
	1948–1958	Air force units flag model	

==== Marine Corps ====
Flag	Duration	Use	Description
		Flag of the Republic of China Marine Corps	
		General's flag	
		Lieutenant general's flag	
		Major general's flag	
		Colonel's flag	
		Republic of China Marine Corps unit flag	In use since 1986.

==== Combined Logistics Command ====
Flag	Duration	Use	Description
	1973–2012	Flag of the Republic of China Combined Service Force	
	1964–1979	Flag of the Republic of China Combined Service Force	
	1960–1964	Flag of the Republic of China Combined Service Force	
	1958–1960	Flag of the Republic of China Combined Service Force	
	1956–1958	Flag of the Republic of China Combined Service Force	
	1952–1956	Flag of the Republic of China Combined Service Force	

==== National Defense University ====
Flag	Duration	Use	Description
	2014–present	Banner of the Military College of the National Defense University	
	2014–present	Banner of the Military College of Command and Staff of the National Defense University	
	2014–present	Naval Command and Staff College flag	
	2014–present	Air Command and Staff College flag	
	2014–present	National Defense Medical Center flag	
	2014–present	Flag of Fu Hsing Kang College	
	2014–present	Chung Cheng Institute of Technology flag	
	2014–present	Flag of the Higher School of Management of the National Defense University	
	2000–2014	Old banner of the Military College of the National Defense University	
	1968–2000	Old flag of the National Defense University	

=== Coast Guard Administration ===
Flag	Duration	Use	Description
	2000–present	Flag of the Coast Guard Administration of the Republic of China	
	2000–present	Flag of the minister of Coast Guard of the Republic of China	
	2000–present	Flag of the director of Coast Guard of the Republic of China	
	2000–present	Flag of the Nansha commander of Coast Guard of the Republic of China	
	2000–present	Flag of the director general of Coast Guard of the Republic of China	
	2000–present	Unit flag of Coast Guard of Republic of China	
	1925–1928	Ensign of Coastal Defense of Republic of China	

=== Police ===
Flag	Duration	Use	Description
	1974–present	Flag of police of the Republic of China	
	1947–1974	Flag of police of the Republic of China	Flag of the Republic of China defaced with a golden pigeon in the fly.
	1932–1947	Flag of police of the Republic of China.	
	1912–1928	Flag of police of the Republic of China	
	1974–present	Flag of National Police Agency	
	1974–present	Flag of Central Police University	
	1974–present	Flag of Volunteer Police of the Republic of China	
	1974–present	Flag of Director-General of ROC Police	
	1974–present	Flag of Commissioner of Direct-controlled municipality of ROC Police	
	1932–1949	Flag of Voluntary Police of the Republic of China	

==== Water Police ====
Flag	Duration	Use	Description
	1928–1949	Ensign of the Chinese Water Police	
	1912–1928	Ensign of the Chinese Water Police	

=== Fire Service ===
Flag	Duration	Use	Description
	1996–present	Flag of the National Fire Agency	
	1996–present	Unit flag of the National Fire Agency	

=== Rescue aviation ===
Flag	Duration	Use	Description
	2005–present	Flag of the National Airborne Service Corps	

=== Ministries ===
Flag	Duration	Use	Description
		Flag of the Sports Administration	
		Flag of the Ministry of Transportation and Communications	
		Flag of the Ministry of Education	
	2014–present	Flag of the Ministry of Finance	
	1950–2014	Flag of the Ministry of Finance	Previously used as flag of the Inspector-General of Customs during 1929–50. Green background with yellow saltire superimposed by "Blue Sky with a White Sun" flag.
		Flag of the Ministry of Health and Welfare	

=== Councils ===
Flag	Duration	Use	Description
		Flag of the Atomic Energy Council	
		Flag of the Veterans Affairs Council	
		Flag of the Overseas Community Affairs Council	
		Flag of the National Communications Commission	
		Flag of the National Development Council	

=== Agency ===
Flag	Duration	Use	Description
		Flag of the Taiwan Area National Freeway Bureau of the Republic of China	Not in use since the Taiwan Area National Bureau merged into Freeway Bureau in 2018.
		Flag of the Civil Aeronautics Administration of the Republic of China	
		Flag of the Bureau of High Speed Rail of the Republic of China	Not in use since the Bureau of High Speed Rail merged into the Railway Bureau in 2018.
		Flag of the Taiwan Area National Expressway Engineering Bureau, MOTC, Republic of China	Not in use since the Taiwan Area National Expressway Engineering Bureau merged into the Freeway Bureau in 2018.
		Flag of the Institute of Transportation of the Republic of China	
	2014–present	Flag of the Maritime and Port Bureau of the Republic of China	
	2007–present	Flag of the National Immigration Agency of the Republic of China	

=== Civil and merchant ensign ===
Flag	Duration	Use	Description
	1929–1966	Civil ensign of the Republic of China	Four yellow zigzag stripes were added to the flag of the Republic of China for use as a civil ensign at sea. Present civil ensign is national flag.
	1935 – c. 1949	Ensign of Chinese Fishery Patrol & Fishery Investigation Test Vessels	

=== Postal flags ===
Flag	Duration	Use	Description
	1935–	Postal ensign of the Republic of China	
	1929–1935	Postal ensign of the Republic of China	The "Blue Sky with a White Sun" was placed in the canton.
	1919–1929	Postal ensign of the Republic of China	White flag with the five-colored flag in the canton, bilingual text "Postes" in the lower hoist quarter, and a greylag goose in the fly half.

=== Chinese Maritime Customs Service ===
Flag	Duration	Use	Description
	1977–present	Customs flag	
	1977–present	Flag of the Director General of Customs	
	1929–1950	Flag of the Inspector-General (Note: Still used by the ROC Minister of Finance until 2014.)	Green background with yellow saltire superimposed by "Blue Sky with a White Sun" flag.
	1931–1950 (In use by vessels until 1976)	Ensign of Chinese Customs (Nanking Government)	
	1929–1931	Ensign of Chinese Customs (Nanking Government)	
	1911–1928	Ensign of Chinese Customs (Beiyang Government)	

=== Salt Administration ===
Flag	Duration	Use	Description
	1929–1949	Ensign of the Chinese Salt Administration	
	1912–1929	Ensign of the Chinese Salt Administration	

=== Yacht club ensign ===
Flag	Duration	Use	Description
	1966–present	Yacht club ensign of the Republic of China	Four yellow zigzag stripes are added to the flag of the Republic of China for use as a yacht club ensign. Previously used as civil ensign during 1928–66.
	1966–present	Yacht club burgee of the Republic of China	The Blue Sky with a White Sun in a burgee (pennant) form.

=== Sporting flags ===
Flag	Duration	Use	Description
	1979–	Chinese Taipei Olympic flag	The ROC is recognized as "Chinese Taipei" in the Olympics, due to the political status of Taiwan.
	2019–	Flag of Chinese Taipei used in the Paralympic Games	
	2004–2019	Flag of Chinese Taipei used in the Paralympic Games	
	pre–2004	Flag of Chinese Taipei used in the Paralympic Games	
		Flag of Chinese Taipei used in the Deaflympics	
		Flag of Chinese Taipei used in the Universiade	
		Flag of the Chinese Taipei Volleyball Association	
		Chinese Taipei esports flag	Used in esports competitions organized by Blizzard Entertainment.
		Former Chinese Taipei football flag	

=== City and county flags ===
As of 1997 November 18; 29 years ago, the Chinese Government banned localities from making and using local flags and emblems. Despite the ban, some cities have adopted their own flag that often includes their local emblem as shown below. The ROC-controlled areas continues to use the respective flags.

=== Provinces ===
The PRC-controlled mainland does not have provincial flags, but the ROC-controlled area has a flag for one of its two provinces.

Flag	Duration	Use	Description
		Taiwan Province	

Flag	Administrative division	Adopted	Description
	Kaohsiung City	2010–present	Stylized "高". The colors symbolize sunshine, vitality, environmental protection, and the ocean.
	New Taipei City	2010–present	Stylized "北" in the form of four hearts arranged to resemble a four-leaf clover.
	Taichung City	2008–present	
	Tainan City	2010–present	
	Taipei City	2010–present	
	Taoyuan City	2014–present	
	Chiayi City		
	Keelung City		
	Changhua County		
	Chiayi County		
	Hsinchu County		
	Hualien County		
	Kinmen County		
	Lienchiang County		
	Miaoli County		
	Nantou County		
	Penghu County		
	Pingtung County		
	Taitung County		
	Yilan County		
	Yunlin County		

==== History ====
Flag	Duration	Use	Description
	1922–1949	Flag of Kunming	The flag features the former city emblem which consists of two intersecting red circles which represent the harmony of sun and moon, as well as western and eastern ideas. In the middle is a golden stylized symbol of a 市 character.
	1981–2010	Old flag of Taipei City	Previous flag used by Taipei City, with its seal on top of 16 horizontal stripes of white and blue.
	1999–2006	Old flag of New Taipei City	
	1980s–1999	Old flag of New Taipei City	
	2006–2010	Old flag of New Taipei City	
	?–2010	Old flag of Hsinchu County	
	2018–2019	Old flag of Hsinchu County	
	2010–2018	Old flag of Hsinchu County	
	1951–2010	Old flag of Taichung County	
	1978–2010	Old flag of Tainan City	
	?–2010	Old flag of Tainan County	
	1974–2009	Old flag of Kaohsiung City	
	?–1999	Old flag of Kaohsiung County	
	1999–2010	Old flag of Kaohsiung County	
	1984–2014	Old flag of Taitung County	

=== University flags ===
Flag	Duration	Use	Description
	1910s–?	Flag of the University of China	
	1928–?	Flag of the Shanghai Jiao Tong University	

=== Political flags ===
Flag	Duration	Use	Description
current
	2017–present	Flag of the Taiwan People's Communist Party	
	2007–present	Flag of Taiwan Civil Government^{zh}	
	2006–present	Flag of the Hakka Party	
	2006–present	Flag of Sovereign State for Formosa & Pescadores Party^{zh}	
Link to file	2005–present	Flag of Taiwan Independent Union^{zh}	
Link to file	2004–present	Flag of the Non-Partisan Solidarity Union	
	2003–present	Flag of the Taiwan Labor Party^{zh}	
	2000–present	Flag of the People First Party	
	1993–present	Flag of the New Party	
	2010s–present	Flag of the Patriot Alliance Association	
	1993–present	Flag of the Patriot Alliance Association	
	1989–present	Flag of the Labor Party	Red flag with a green pile reversed (a triangle based at the bottom) and yellow star.
Link to file	1989–present	Flag of the Chinese People's Party	
Link to file	1986–present	Flag of the Democratic Progressive Party	
	?–present	Flag of the Democratic Progressive Party ward on the Matsu Islands	
	1970–present	Flag of World United Formosans for Independence	
	1923–present	Flag of the Chinese Youth Party	
	1921–1949	Flag of the Chinese Communist Party	Communist hammer and sickle. Used by the CPC during the Republic of China era.
	1895–present	Flag of the Kuomintang	Blue Sky with a White Sun
former
	2018–2020	Flag of the Congress Party Alliance	
	2014–2020	Flag of the Alliance of military personnel, officials and teachers^{zh}	
	2007–2019	Flag of the Home Party	
	2018–2019	Flag of the Taiwan Military (Junta) Government, a self-declared government led by Gao Anguo.^{zh}	
	2015–2019	Flag of the Minkuotang	
	2009–2020	Flag of the Taiwan Democratic Communist Party	
Link to file	2007–2019	Flag of the Taiwan Farmers' Party	
Link to file	1996–2020	Flag of the Taiwan Independence Party	
Link to file	1994–2020	Flag of the Taiwan Communist Party	
	1991–2020	Flag of the Chinese Social Democratic Party^{zh}	
	1946–2020	Flag of the China Democratic Socialist Party	Stylized "井" in center
	1933–1934	Flag of the Productive People's Party	
	1929–1931	Flag of the Taiwanese People's Party (Active in Japanese Taiwan)	
	1929	Flag of the Taiwanese People's Party (Active in Japanese Taiwan)	Influenced by:
	1925–?	Flag of the Guangdong Peasants' Association	Chinese national flag charged with yellow plough in fly.
	1925–1946	Flag of the Inner Mongolian People's Revolutionary Party	
	1911–?	Flag of the Royalist Party	National flag (1889–1912)
	19th–20th century	Flag of the Yellow Sand Society	Solid yellow flag

=== Cultural flags ===
Flag	Duration	Use	Description
	2018–present	Flag of the Tao people	A white flag with the traditional "boat's eye" symbol and traditional triangular ornaments on the top and bottom.
	2017–present	Flag of the Rukai people	The "Lily Flag" composed of three colors: red, yellow, and green, representing hope, love and peace. The lilies and eagle feathers represent the purity and fairness of the Rukai tribe, was designed by Jin Shaohua.
	2017–present	Flag of Taiwanese indigenous peoples in Taichung	
	2016–present	"National flag" of the Amis people in the Amis Music Festival.	
	?–present	Flag of the Amis people in Taidong (Falangaw tribe^{zh})	
	1984–1998	Flag of the Taiwan Association for the Promotion of Aboriginal Rights^{zh}	

=== Proposed flags ===
==== Republic of China ====
Flag	Duration	Use	Description
	1906	Teo Eng Hock and his wife's proposal 1 for the ROC flag	
	1906	Proposal 2 for the ROC flag	
	1906	Proposal 3 for the ROC flag, later adopted as the flag of the Republic of China Army	
	1906	Proposal 4 for the ROC flag, later adopted as the flag of the China Zhi Gong Party	
	1906	Proposal 5 for the ROC flag, later used as the flag of the marshall in Beiyang government	

==== Taiwan Independence Movement ====
Flag	Duration	Use	Description
	1955	Republic of Taiwan Provisional Government proposal	
	1994	Donald Liu's proposal	
	2005	908 Taiwan Republic Campaign's proposal	
	2013	World Taiwanese Congress proposal	
	2016	"Taiwan the Formosa" by Chih-Hao Chen	

=== Railway flags ===
Flag	Duration	Use	Description
		Railways Ensign of the Republic of China	Also the flag of the Taiwan Railways Administration.
	1919–1951	Railways Ensign of China	Used in Taiwan from 1947 to 1951.

=== House flags ===
Flag	Duration	Use	Description
	1942–1972	House flag of China Merchants Group	
	1873–1942	House flag of China Merchants Group	

=== Association flags ===
Flag	Duration	Use	Description
	1938–1947	Flag of the Three Principles of the People Youth League	
	1952–present	Flag of the China Youth Corps	
	1937–present	Flag of the Red Swastika Society	
		Flag of China Sailor's Union	

=== Warlords ===
Flag	Duration	Use	Description
	1933–1944	Flag of Xinjiang	Used by Sheng Shicai's provincial government in Xinjiang until 1944.
	1949	Flag used in a Ma clique rally.	
	1929	Flag used by Zhang Xueliang's troops	Captured by Soviet soldiers in 1929.

=== Xinhai Revolution ===
Flag	Duration	Use	Description
	1911	Flag of the Huaxinghui	
	1911	Flag used by the rebel force in the Xinhai Revolution in Anqing	
	1911	Flag used by the rebel force in the Xinhai Revolution in Changsha	
	1911	Flag used by the army led by Chen Jiongming	
	1911	Flag used by the rebel force in the Xinhai Revolution in Zhejiang	
	1911	Flag after the victory of the Kunming uprising	
	1911	Flag used by the Qing royalist force in the Xinhai Revolution in Gejiu	

== Qing dynasty and other pre-1912 states ==
=== National flags ===
Flag	Duration	Use	Description
	1862–1912	Flag of the Qing dynasty	Naval flag and quasi-national flag on international occasions.
	1862–1890	Used on Qing dynasty naval ships for identification	Triangular variant of national flag.

=== Standards ===
Flag	Duration	Use	Description
	1862–1912	Standard of the Qing Emperor	Azure Dragon on a plain right triangle yellow field with the red sun of the three-legged crow in the upper hoist corner.

=== Military flags ===
Flag	Duration	Use	Description
	1644–1912	Flag of the Green Standard Army	A green recolouring of the Imperial Standard of the Qing Emperor.
	1615–1911	Flag of the Bordered Yellow Banner of the Eight Banners	The Eight Banners was created in the early 17th century by Nurhaci to unify the Jurchen people into the Manchu dynasty. The first three banners were under the direct command of the Emperor himself.
	1615–1911	Flag of the Plain Yellow Banner of the Eight Banners	
	1615–1911	Flag of the Plain White Banner of the Eight Banners	
	1615–1911	Flag of the Plain Red Banner of the Eight Banners	
	1615–1911	Flag of the Bordered White Banner of the Eight Banners	
	1615–1911	Flag of the Bordered Red Banner of the Eight Banners	
	1615–1911	Flag of the Plain Blue Banner of the Eight Banners	
	1615–1911	Flag of the Bordered Blue Banner of the Eight Banners	

==== Navy ====
Flag	Duration	Use	Description
	1890–1912	The flag of the Qing Imperial Chinese Navy	Square version of previous flag
	1862–1890	Used on Qing dynasty naval ships for identification	Same as national flag
	1909–1911	Flag for the Imperial Chinese Navy Secretary.	
	1909–1911	The flag of the admiral of the Beiyang Fleet.	
	1909–1911	Command flag for the Imperial Chinese Navy vice admiral.	
	1909–1911	Command flag for the Imperial Chinese Navy rear admiral.	
	1909–1911	Command flag for the Imperial Chinese Navy commodore.	
	1909–1911	Command flag for the Imperial Chinese Navy Senior Officer/Fleet Leader.	
	1909–1911	Imperial Chinese Navy Duty Ship Pennant.	
	1909–1911	Imperial Chinese Navy Commission Pennant.	
	1890–1909	The flag of the admiral of the Beiyang Fleet.	
	1874–1890	The flag of the admiral of the Beiyang Fleet.	
	1890–1909	Flag of the Commander (Tongling) of Torpedo Boats	
	1905–1909	Flag of Provincial Commander-in-Chief of Beiyang Fleet	
	1890–1909	Flag of Commodore of Beiyang Fleet	
	1905–1909	Flag of High-ranking Official of Beiyang Fleet	
	1905–1909	Officer (Junguan) of the Beiyang Fleet	
	1905–1909	Flag of Minister of the Navy, or Admiral (de jure, probably not used)	
	1905–1909	Flag of the Admiral and Fleet Commander, or Vice Admiral (de jure, probably not used)	
	1905–1909	Flag of the Admiral and Squadron Commander, or Rear Admiral (de jure, probably not used)	
	1905–1909	Flag of the Commodore, or Commodore First Class (de jure, probably not used)	
	1890–1909	Flag of the Leader (Duizhang), or Commodore Second Class	
Proposed
	Proposed in 1863	Ensign of Qing Navy	
	Proposed in 1863	Commission Pennant of Qing Navy	
Other
	Junk pennants	In addition to the typical flags, some Qing ships also used individual silk pennants.	The two pictures provided here are examples only.

=== Chinese Maritime Customs Service ===
Flag	Duration	Use	Description
	1867–1911	Ensign of Chinese Customs	A green flag with yellow saltire.

=== House flags ===
Flag	Duration	Use	Description
	1873–1942	House flag of China Merchants Group	

=== Flags of localized regimes ===
Flag	Duration	Use	Description
	1860s–1885	Flag of the Black Flag Army	Flag of the Black Flag Army, a Chinese-Vietnamese army and guerrilla force that fought against the French in the Sino-French War. A black flag with a white 令 character.
	1895	Flag of the Republic of Formosa	Tiger on a plain blue field with azure clouds below it.
	1883	Flag used by gold miners in the so-called Zheltuga Republic	Described as a "black and yellow" flag "symbolizing the union of land and gold".
	1873–1877	Flag of Yettishar	
	1865–1873	Flag of Yettishar	
	1856–1873	Flag of the Pingnan Guo	
	1661–1683	Flag of the Kingdom of Tungning	The Chinese character "鄭" in a red circle outline on a plain white field.
	1624–1668	Flag of Dutch Formosa	Flag of the Dutch East India Company
	1626–1642	Flag of Spanish Formosa	Cross of Burgundy

==== Flags of the Boxer Rebellion ====
Flag	Duration	Use	Description
	c. 1890s–1901	Battle flag	Battle flag used by the Yihetuan during the Boxer Rebellion. A red flag with a black square, inscribed with a red character 令 (pinyin: lìng; lit. 'command' or 'order'), inspired by the flag of the Black Flag Army.
	c. 1890s–1901	Anti-foreign flag	A type of flag used by the Yihetuan during the Boxer Rebellion, inscribed with the characters 扶清滅洋 (pinyin: fú qīng miè yáng; lit. 'Support the Qing and Destroy the Foreigners'). A contemporary French Jesuit's diary describes the flag as "yellow [...] with a black border."

==== Flags of the Chinese Pirates ====
Flag	Duration	Use	Description
	c. 1849	Reputedly the flag of the Chinese pirate Shap-ng-tsai or decoration confused with the ensign.	The flag is painted with a depiction of Zhang Daoling (34–156 AD), founder of Daoism as a religion in China. He is seated on a rock holding a Bagua (a symbol of Daoism) with a tiger or qilin behind him. A border of bats runs down the fly edge (a symbol of good luck).

==== Banners described by Wujing Zongyao ====
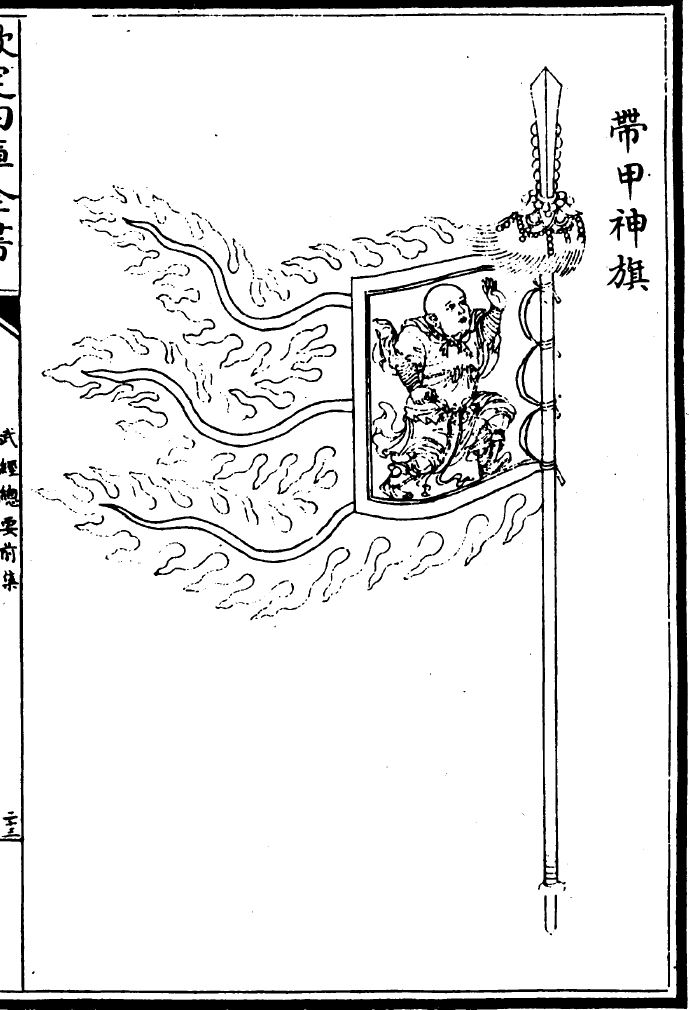
Song dynasty

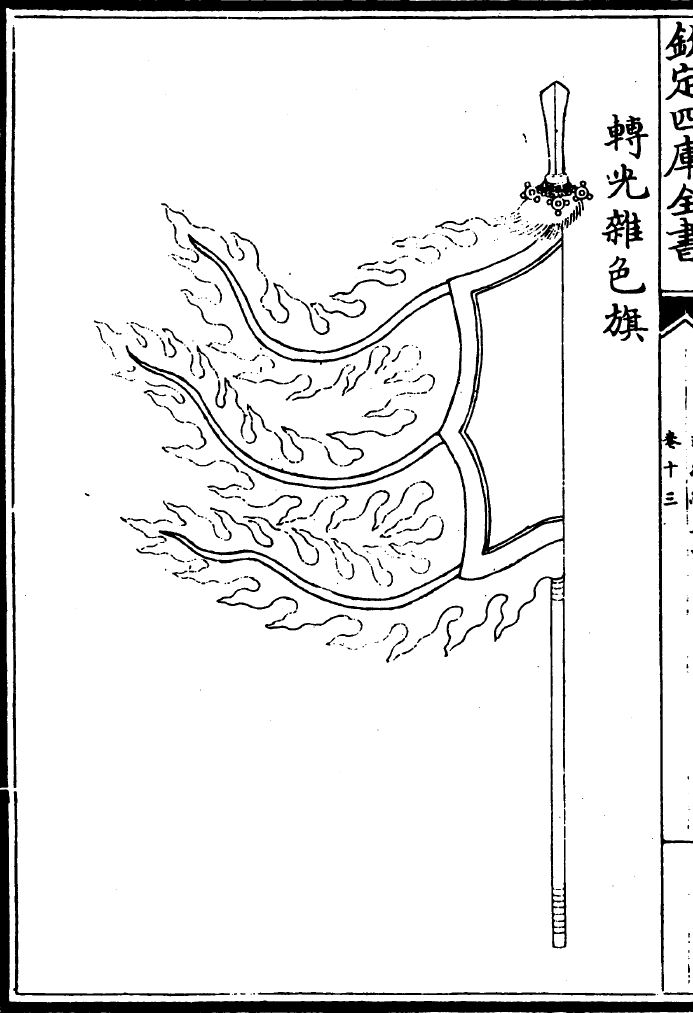
Song dynasty

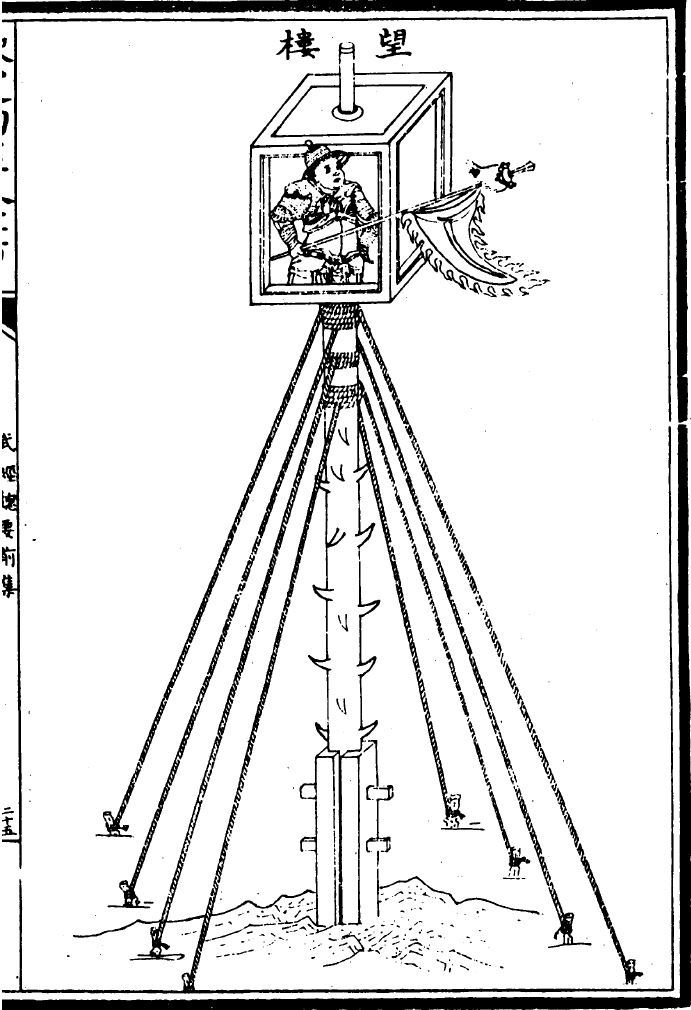
Song dynasty

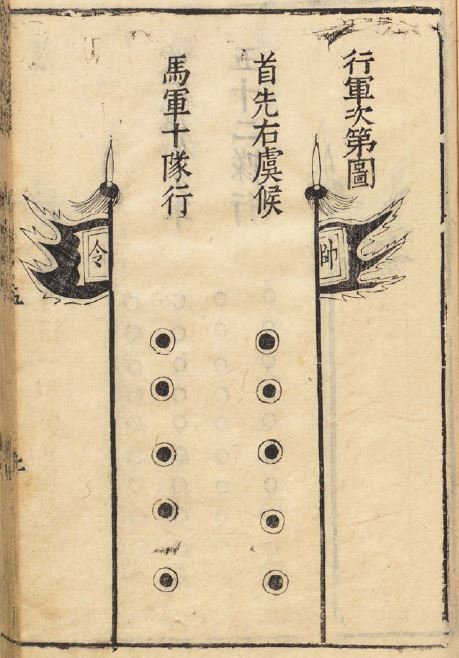
Song dynasty

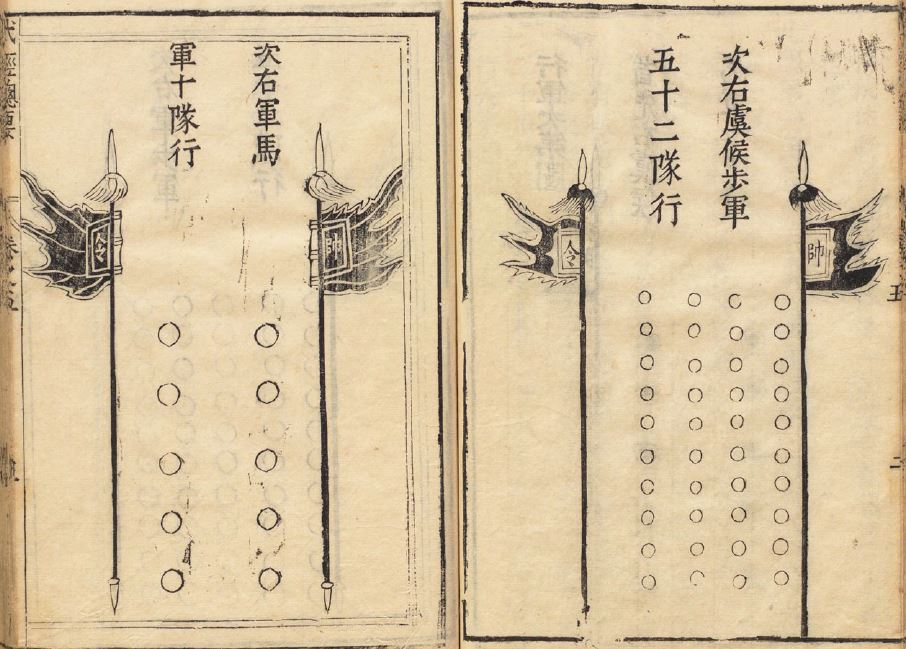
Song dynasty

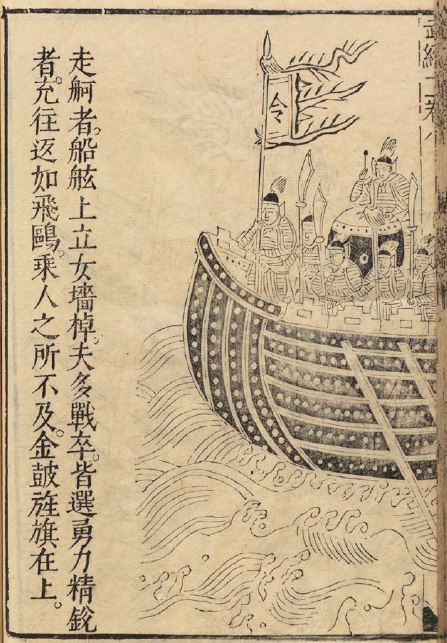
Song dynasty

==== Banners described by Jixiao Xinshu ====
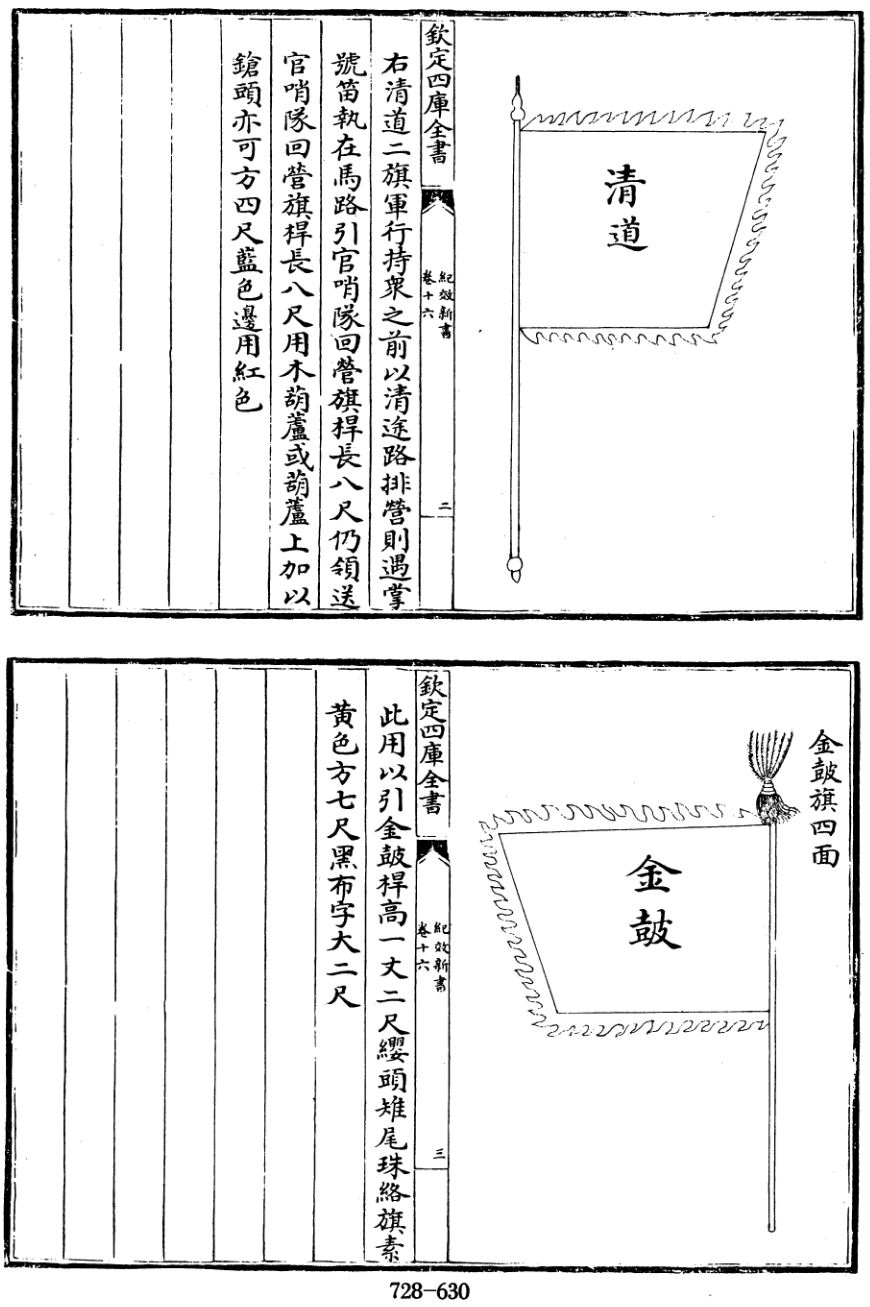
Ming dynasty

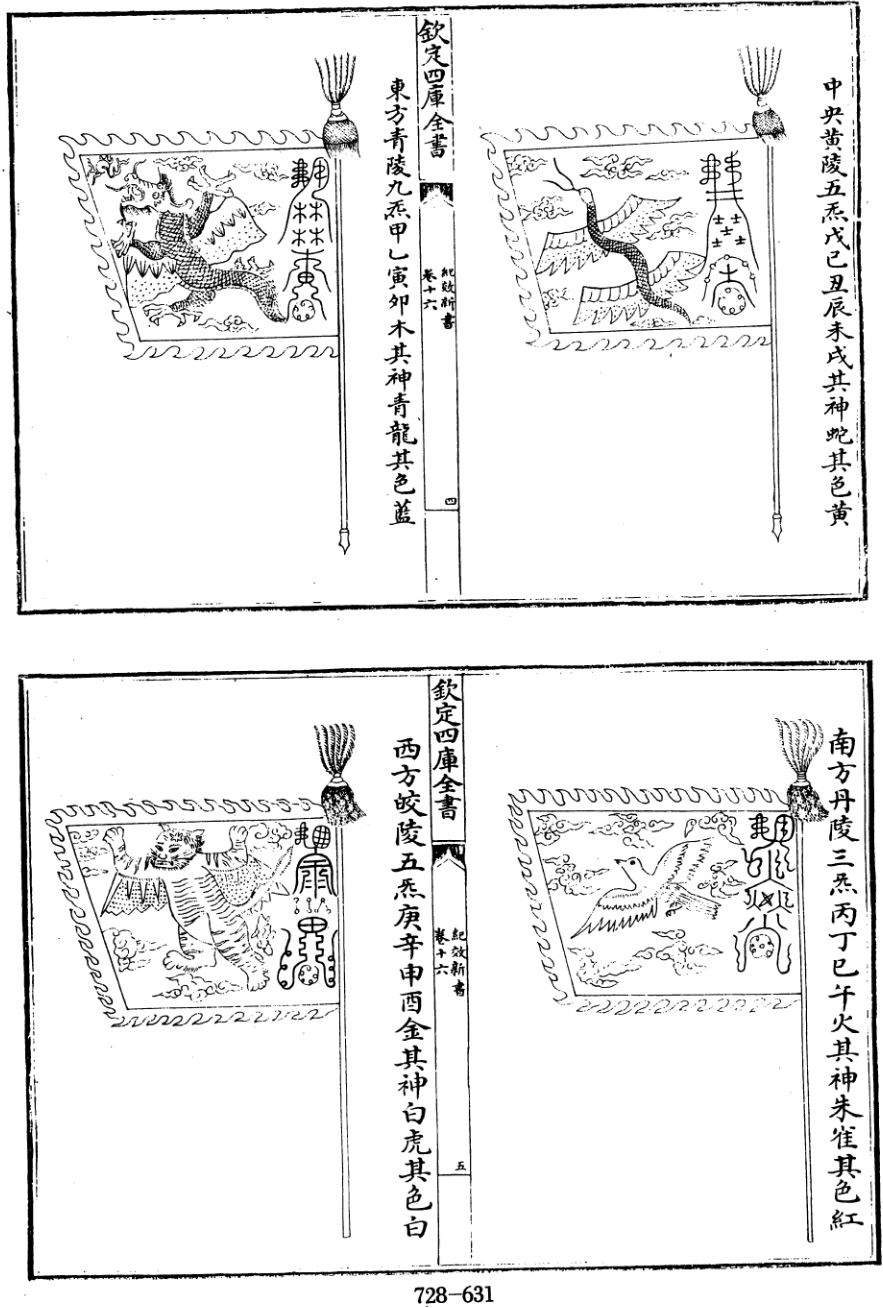
Ming dynasty

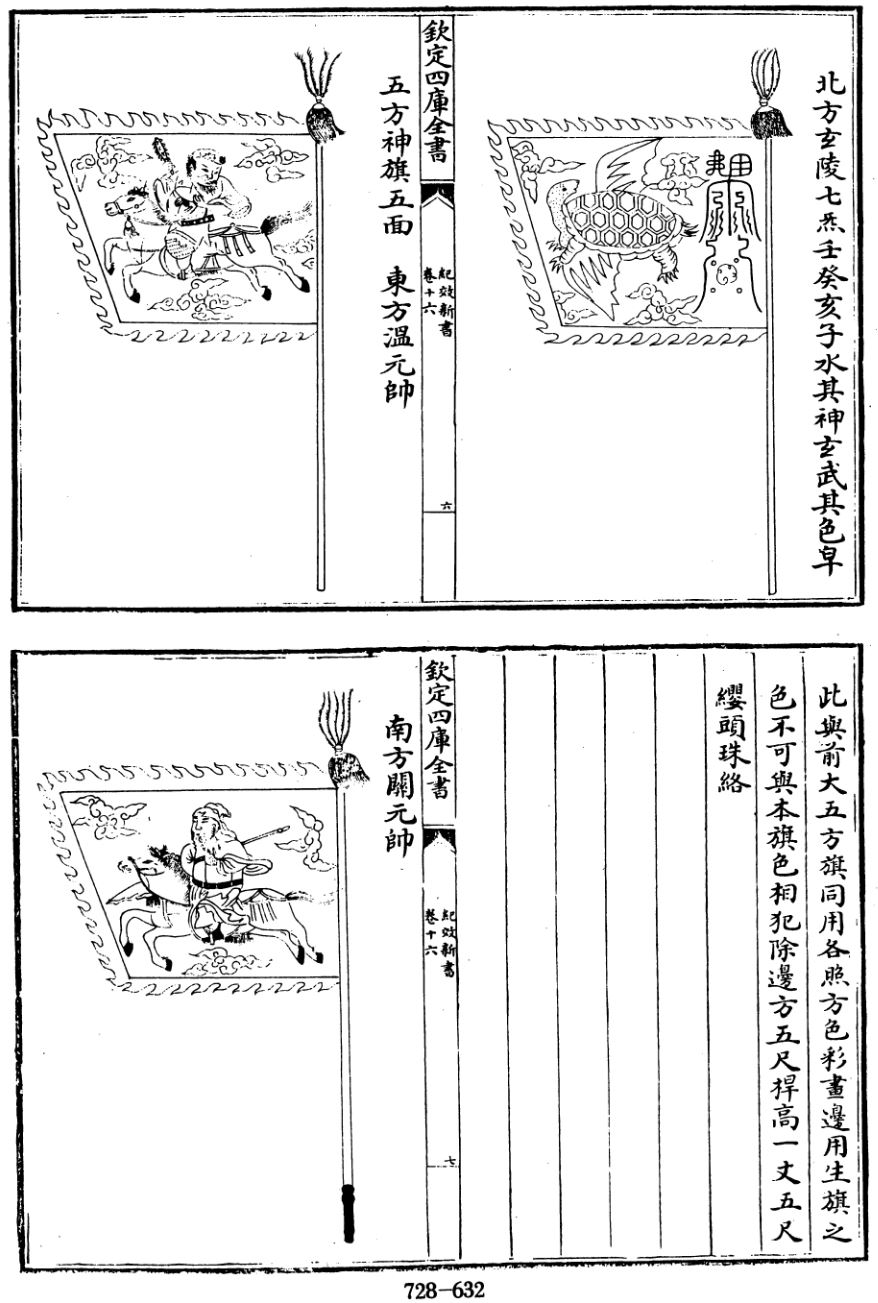
Ming dynasty

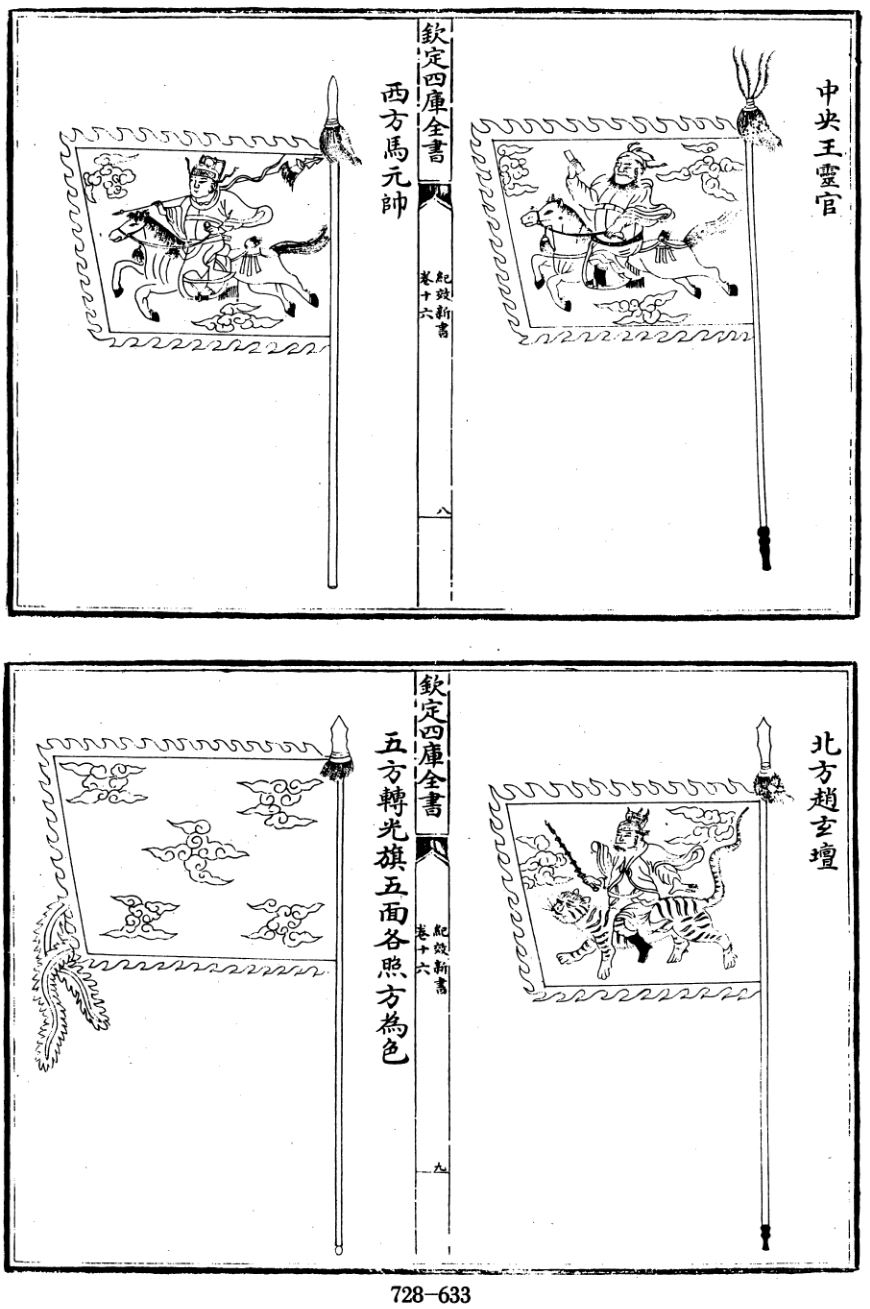
Ming dynasty

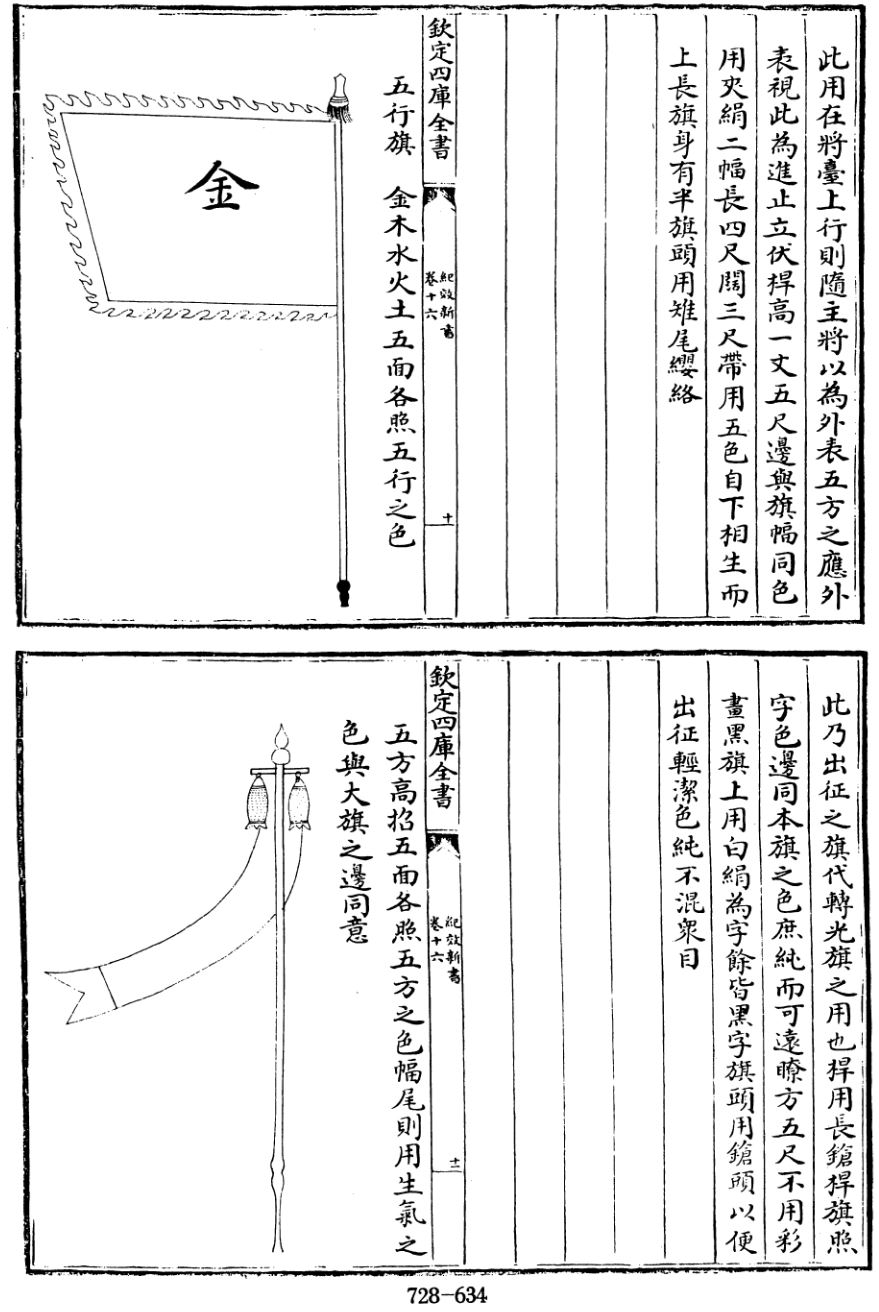
Ming dynasty

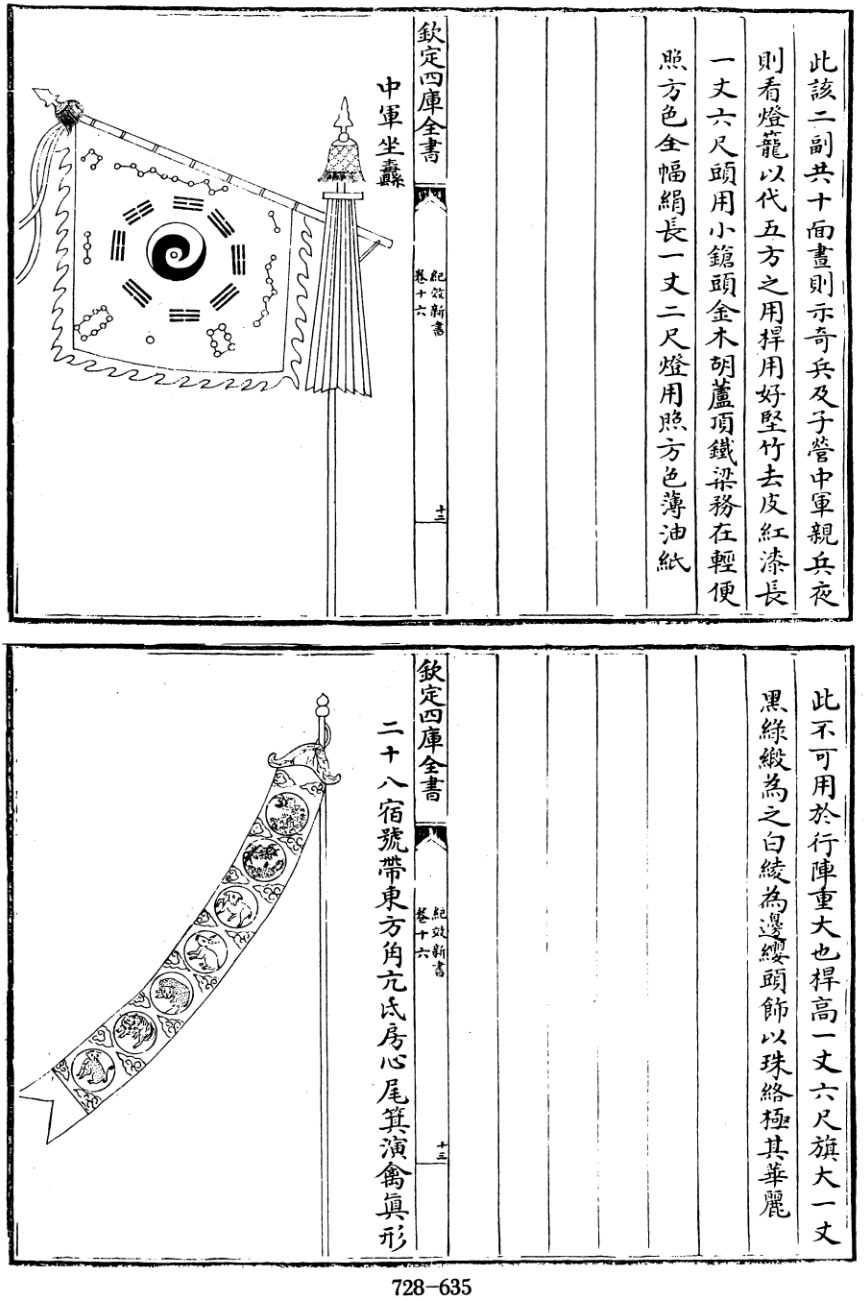
Ming dynasty

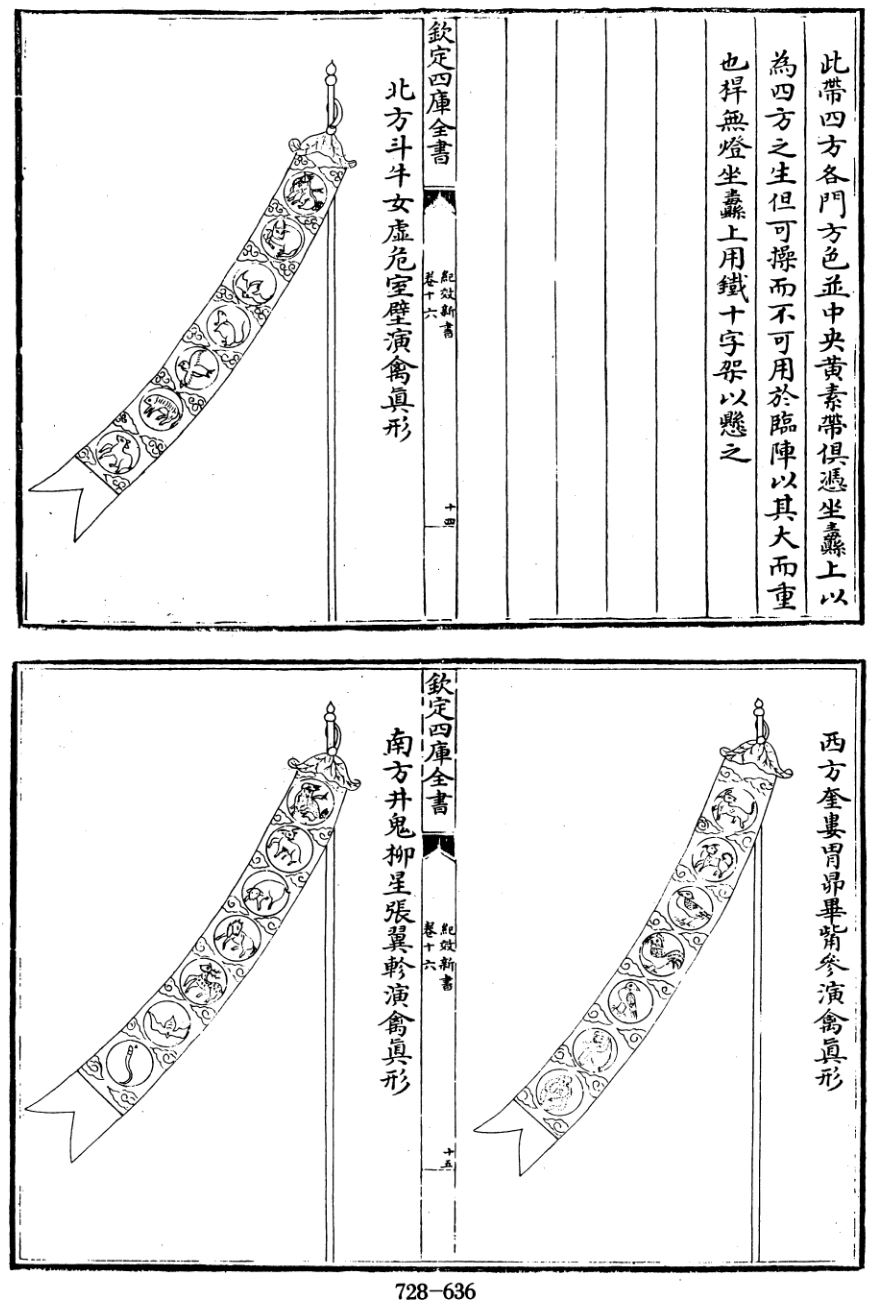
Ming dynasty

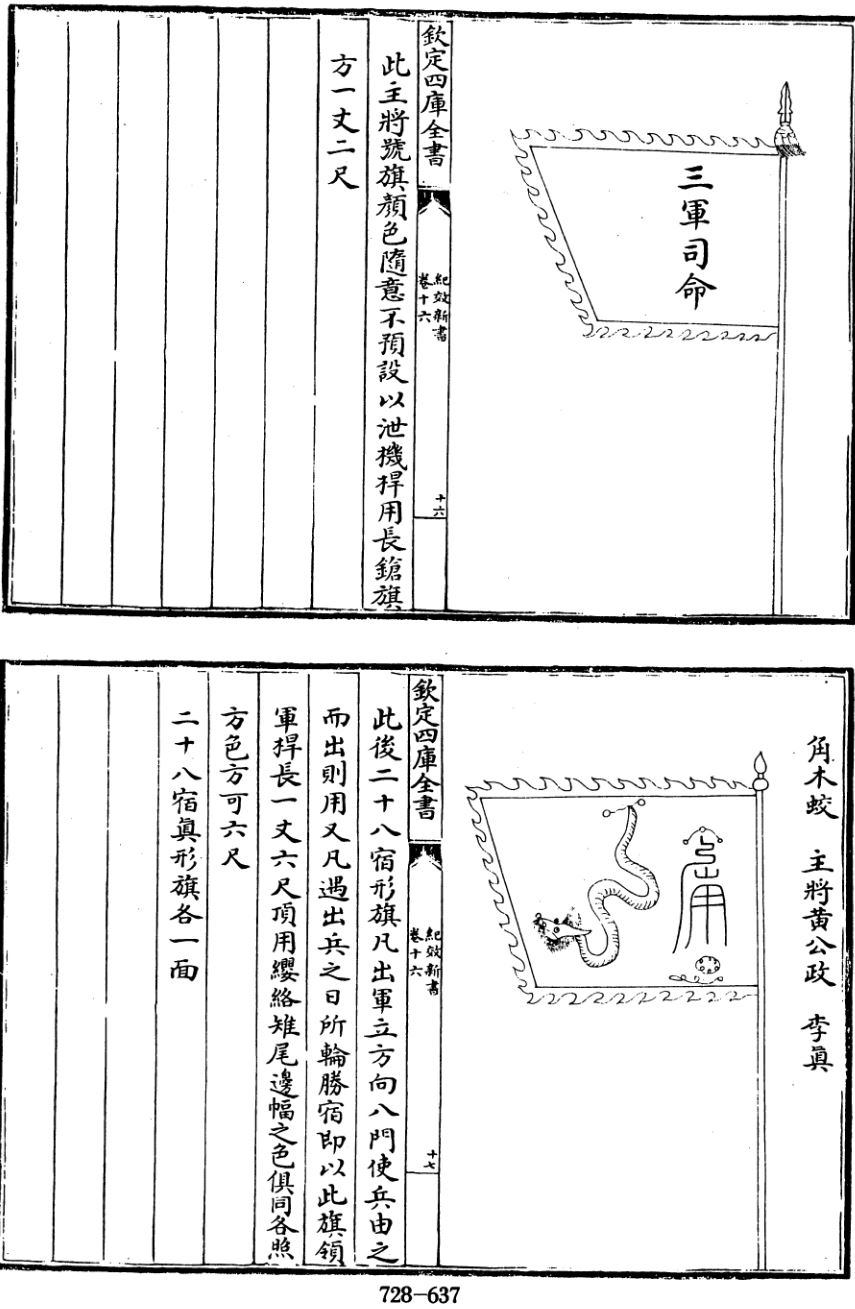
Ming dynasty

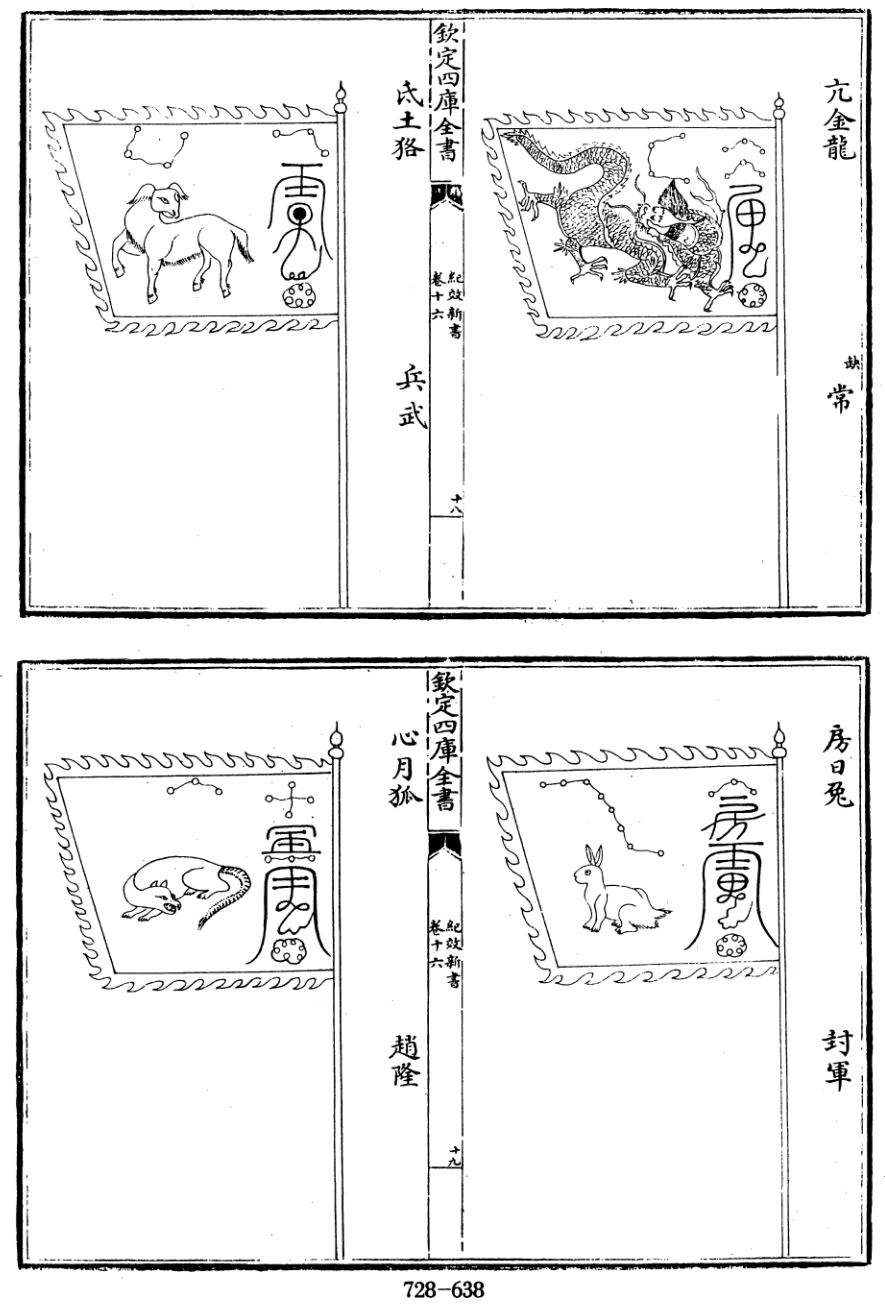
Ming dynasty

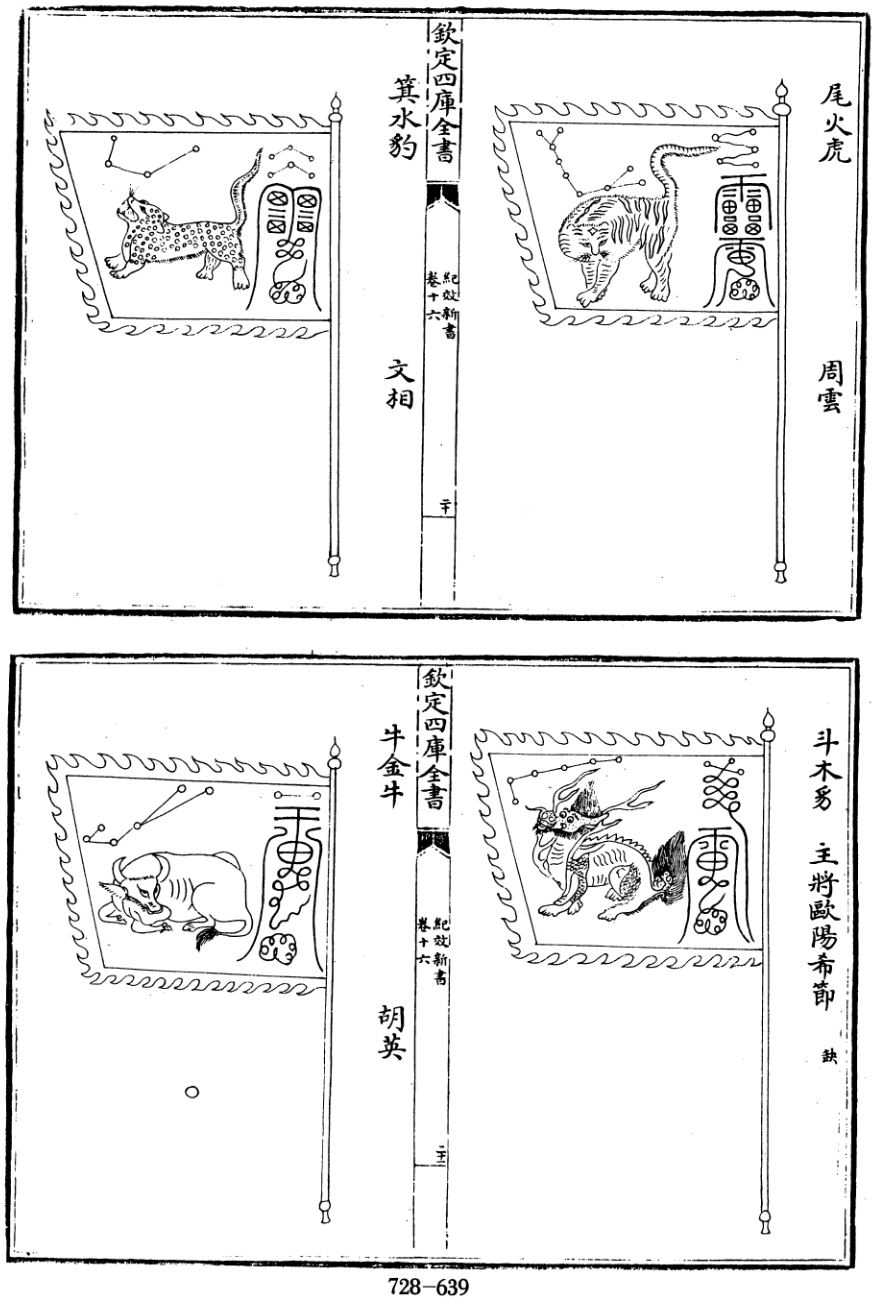
Ming dynasty

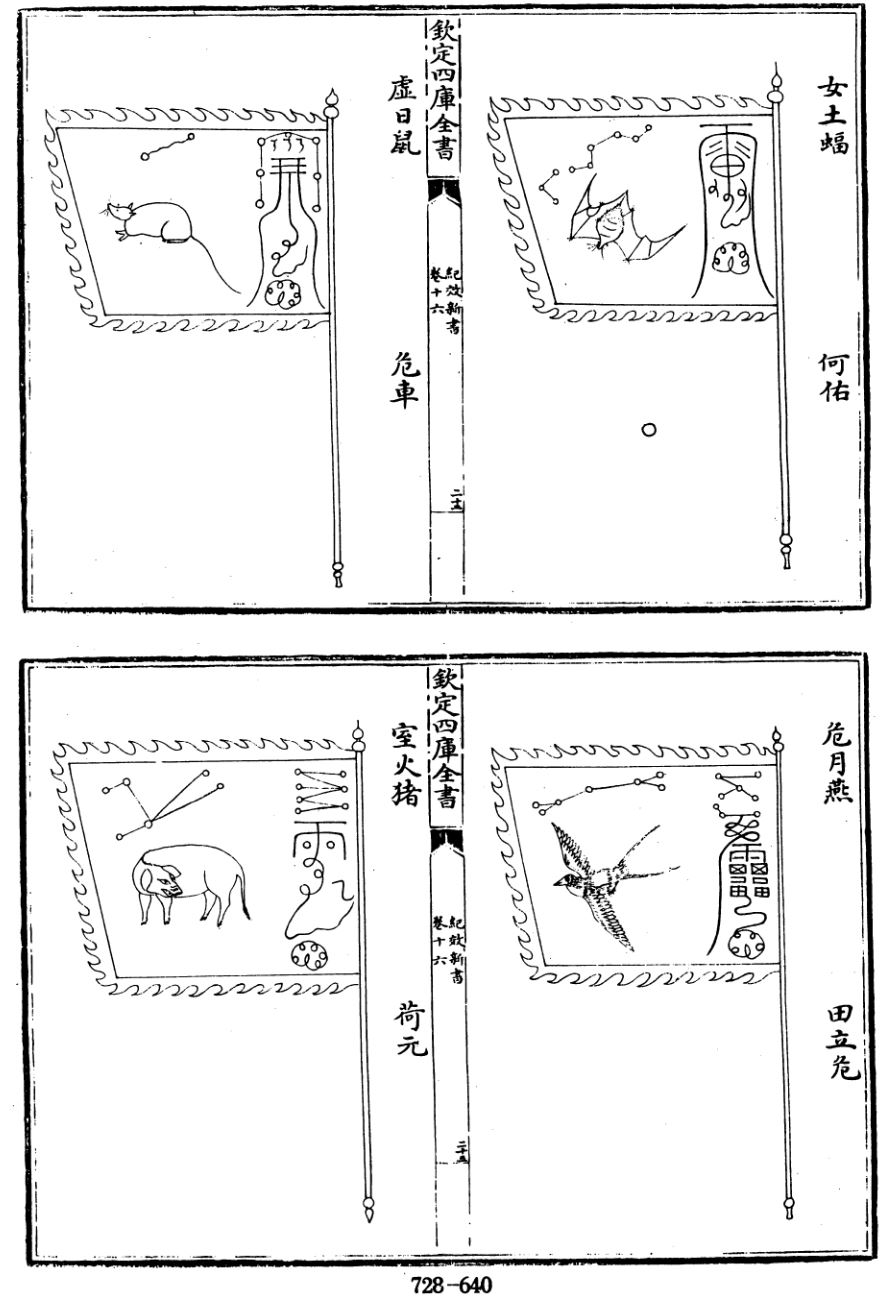
Ming dynasty

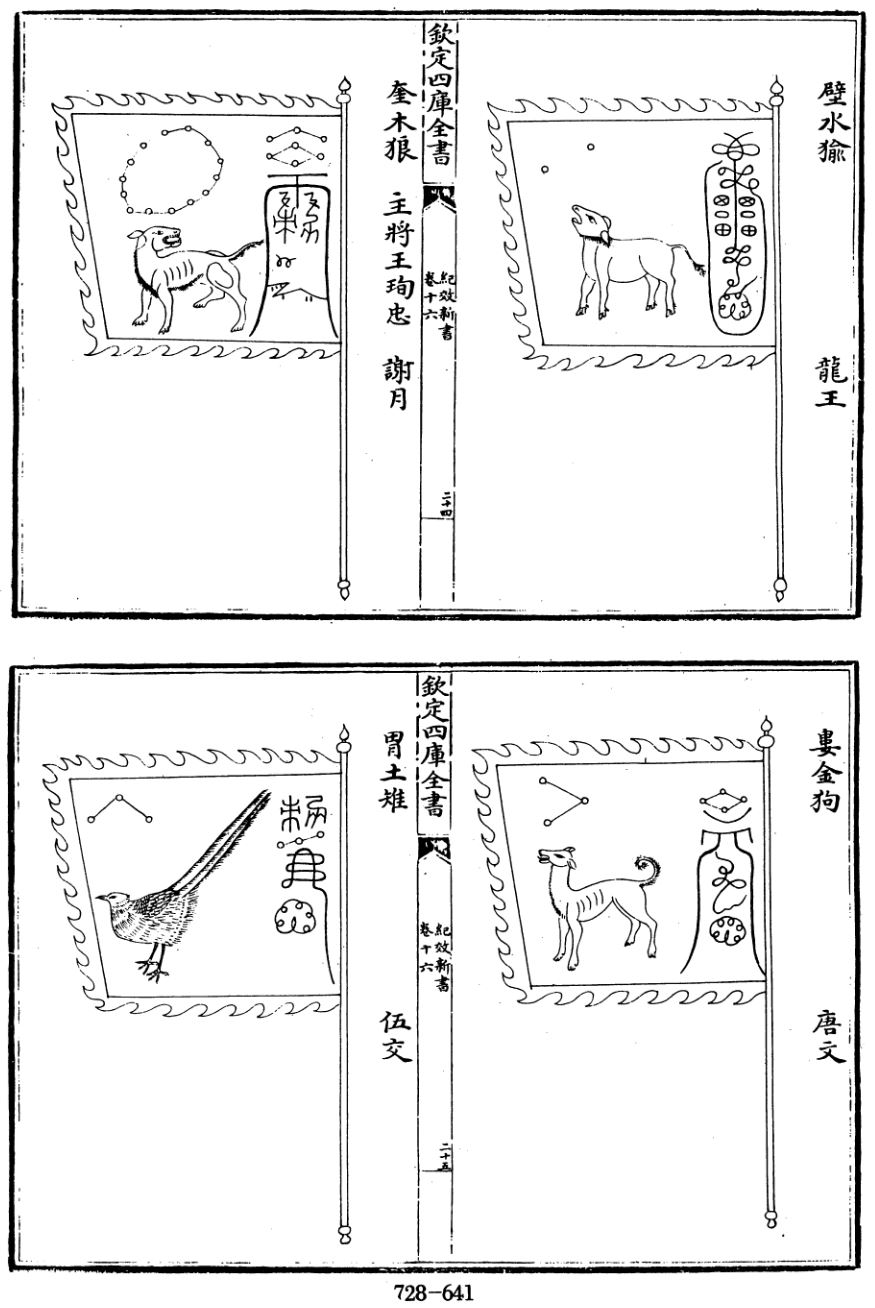
Ming dynasty

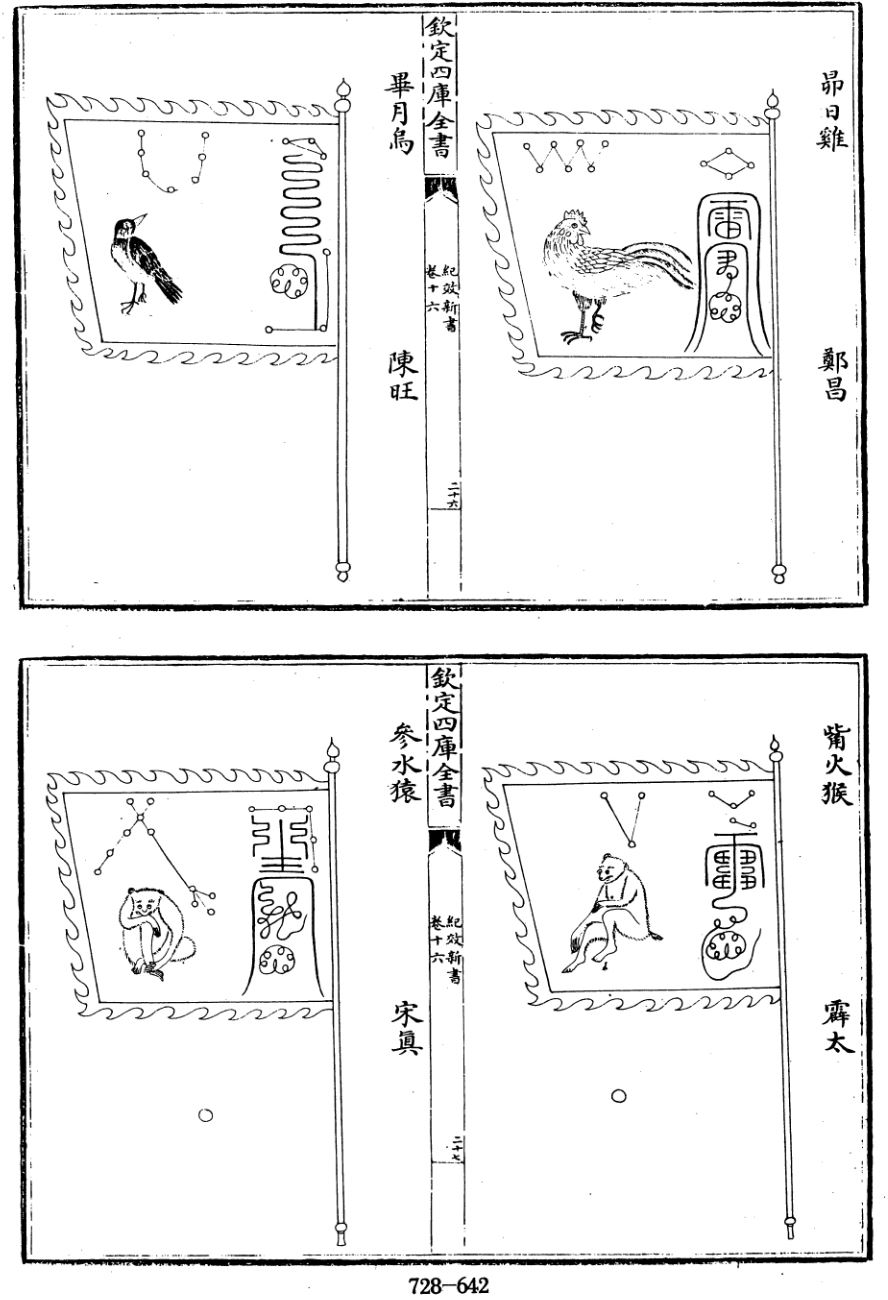
Ming dynasty

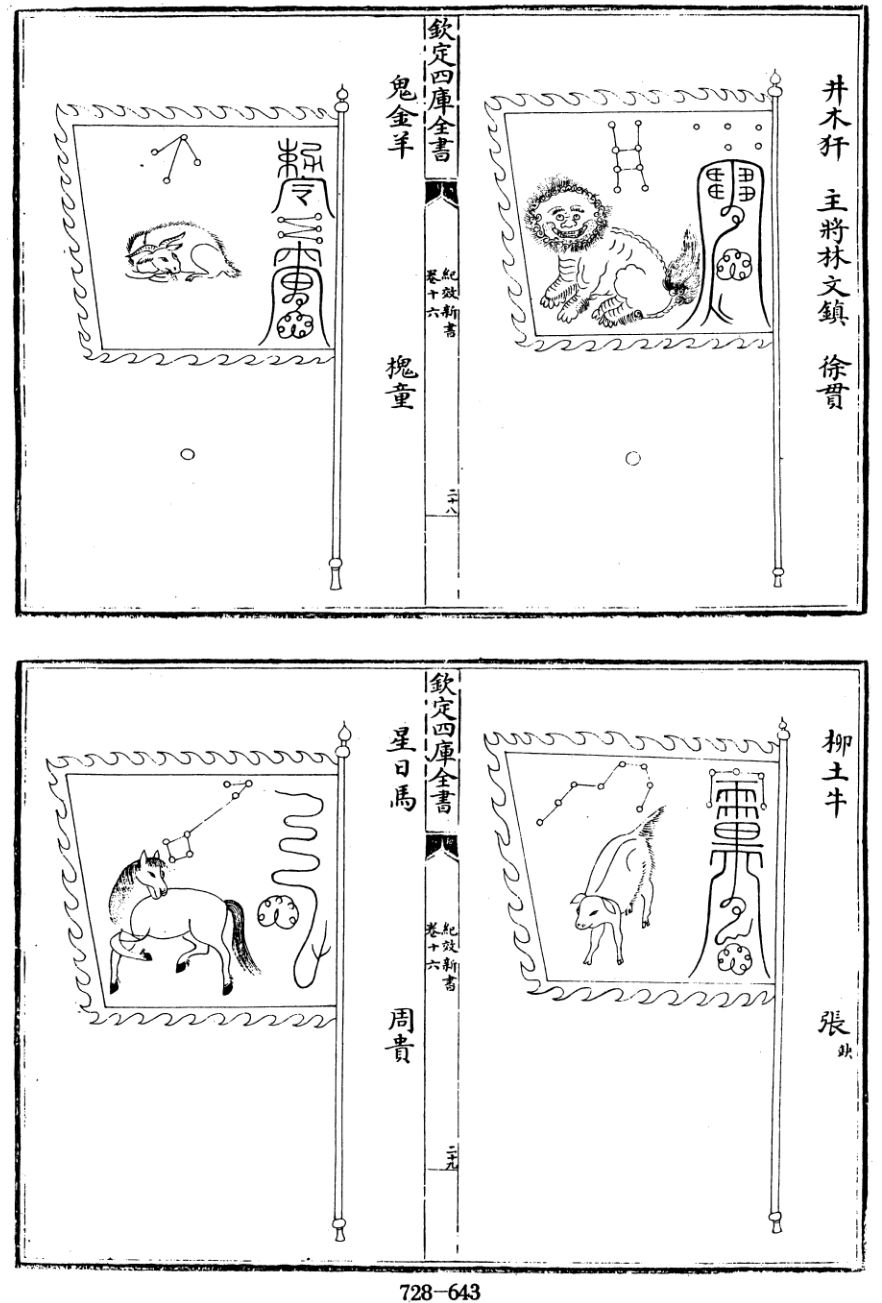
Ming dynasty

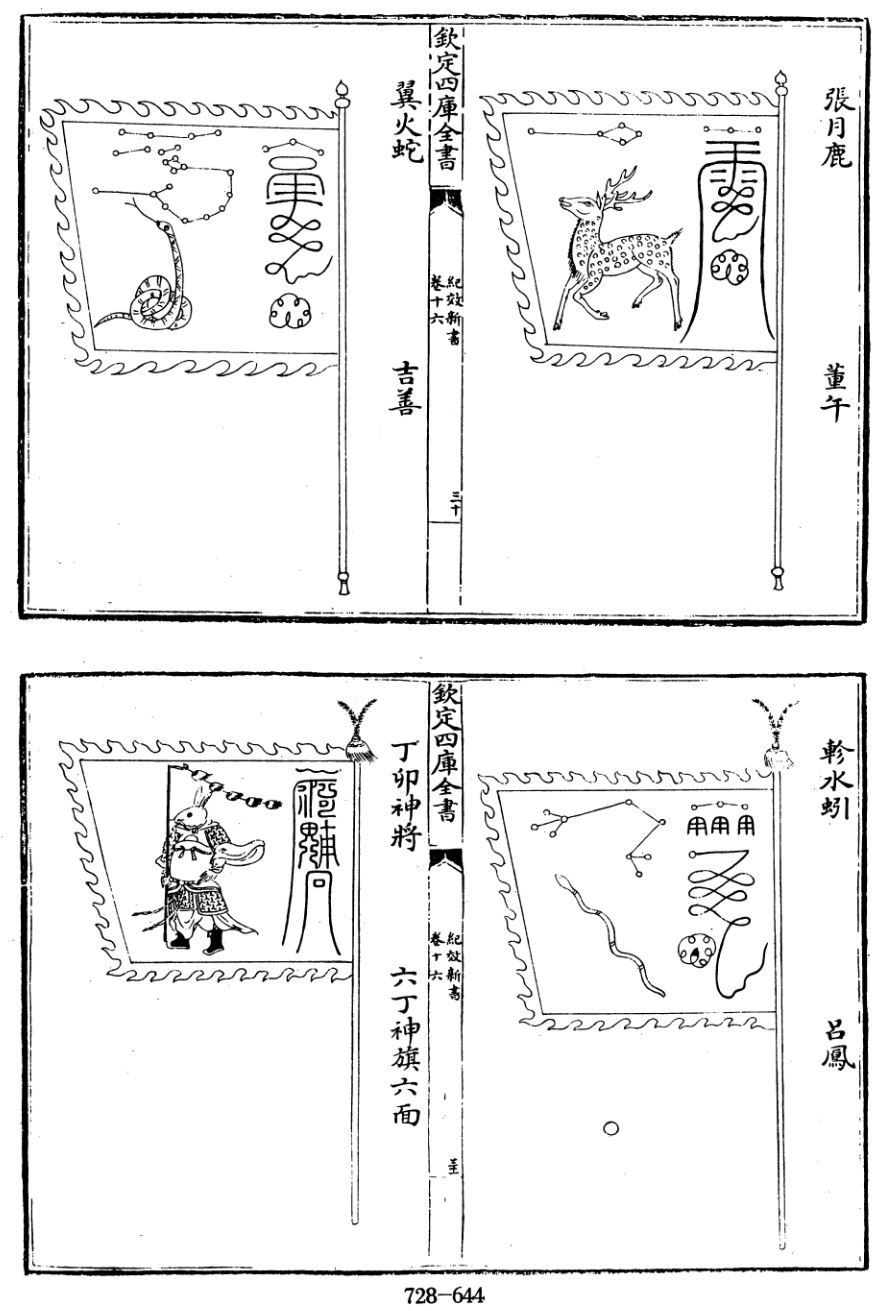
Ming dynasty

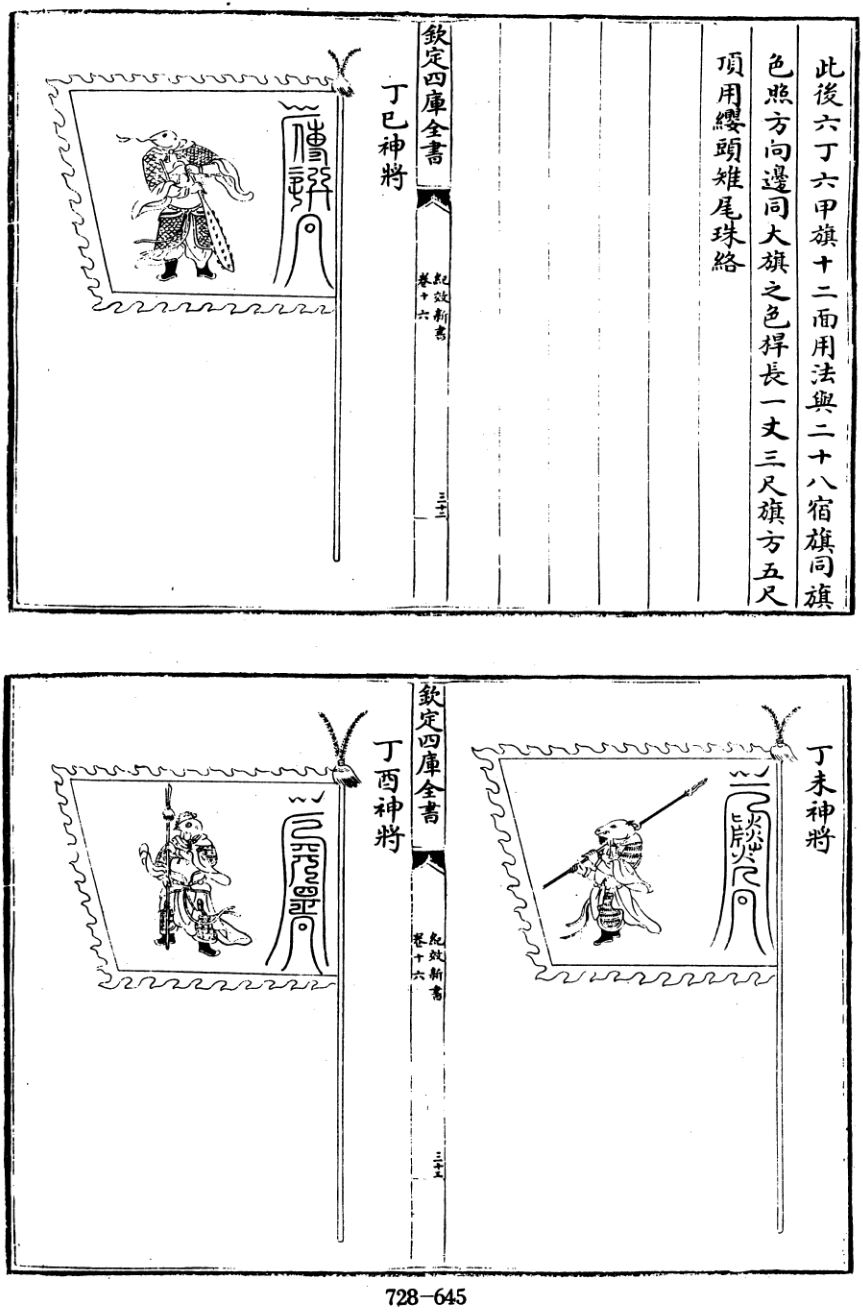
Ming dynasty

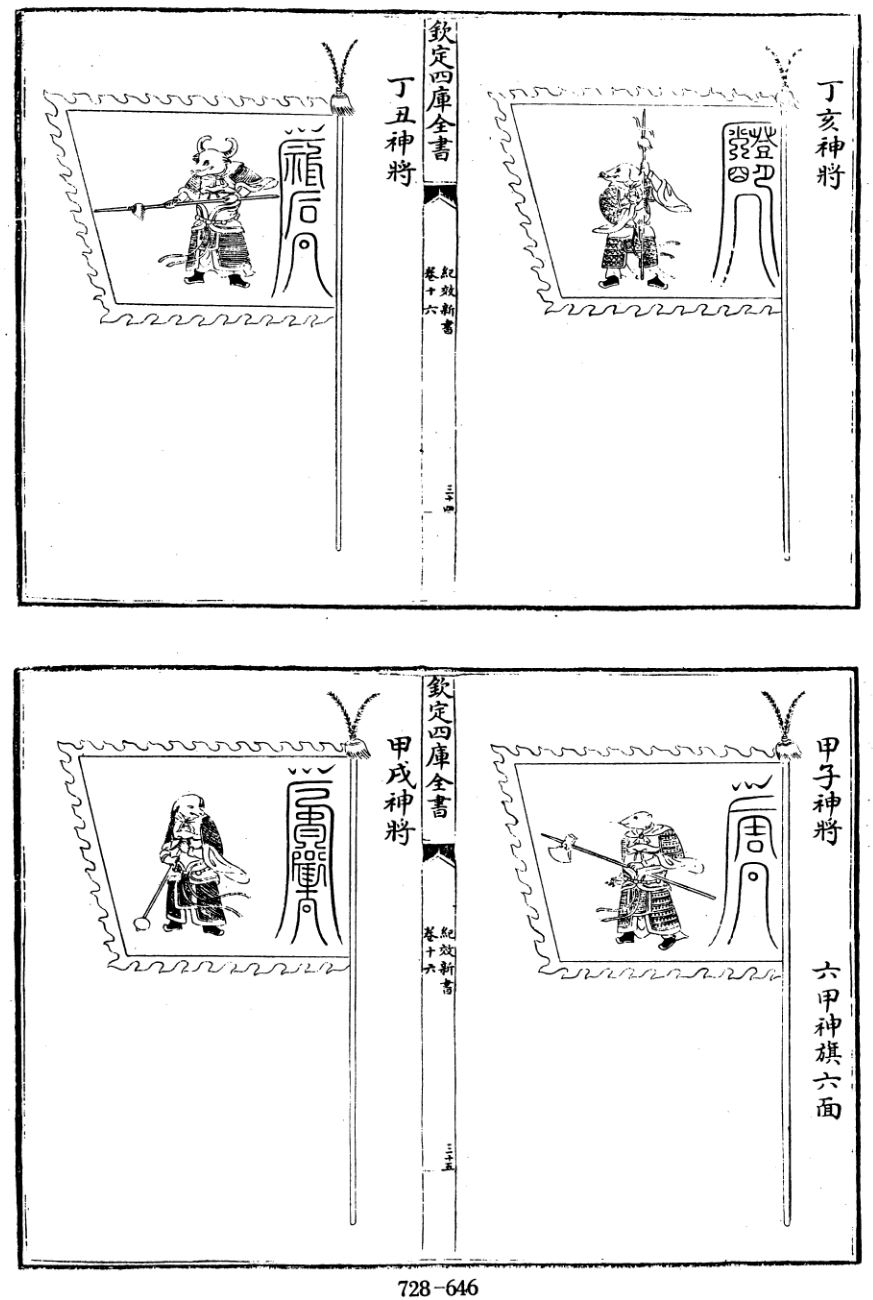
Ming dynasty

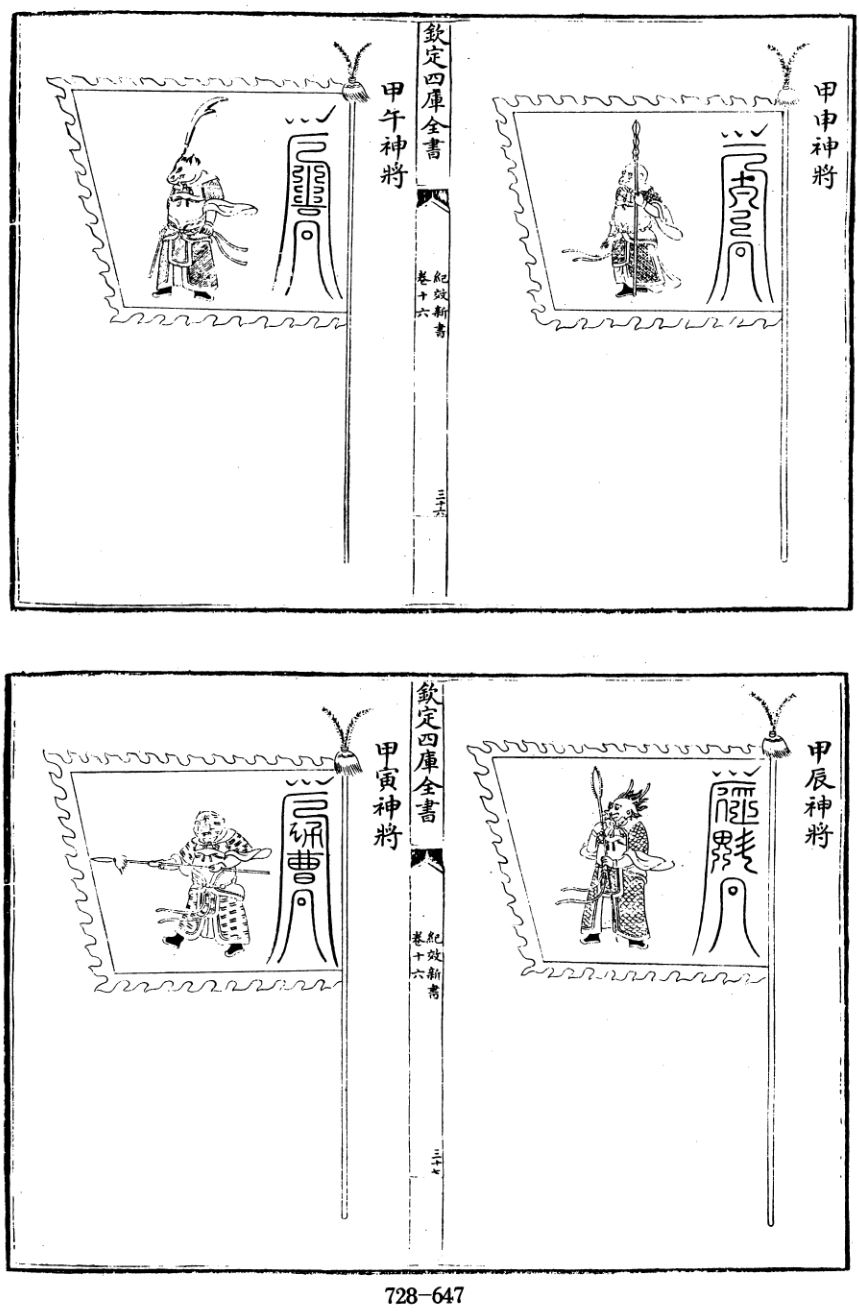
Ming dynasty

==== Banners described by Wubei Zhi ====
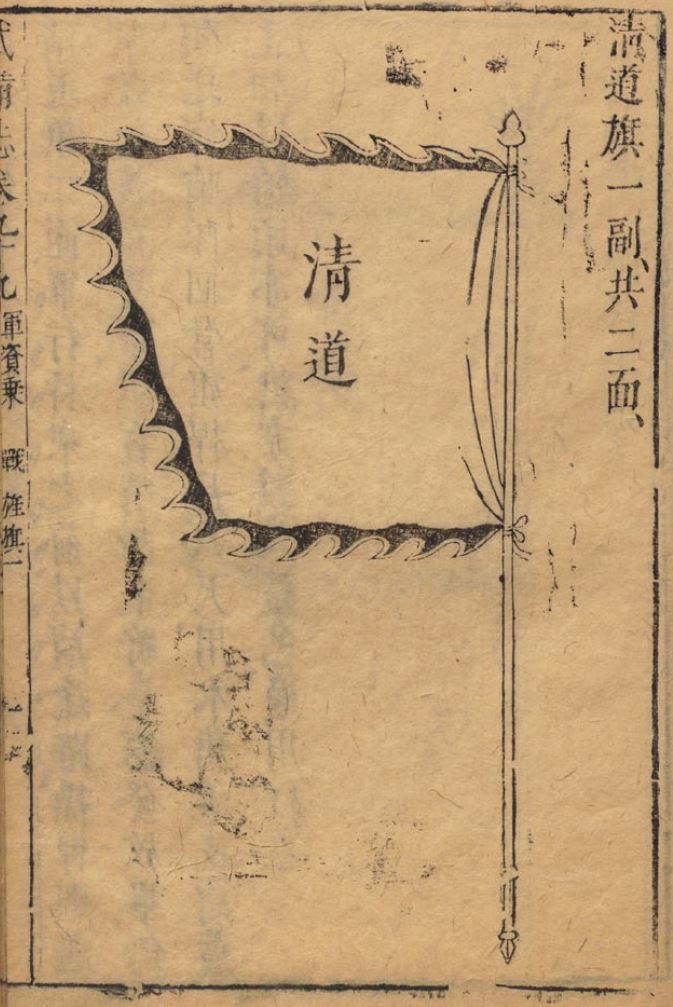
Ming dynasty

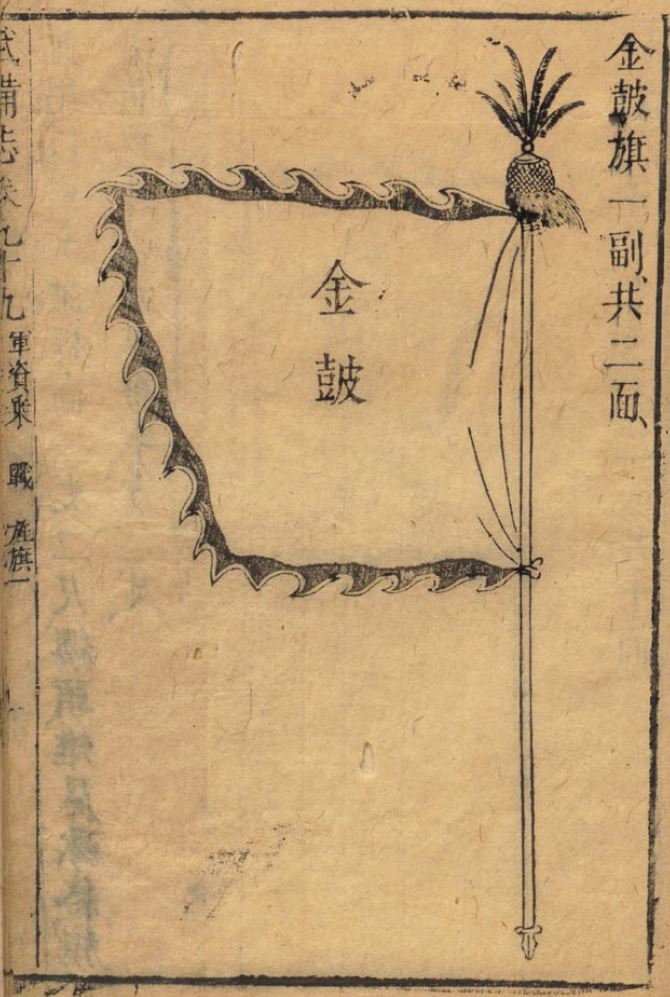
Ming dynasty

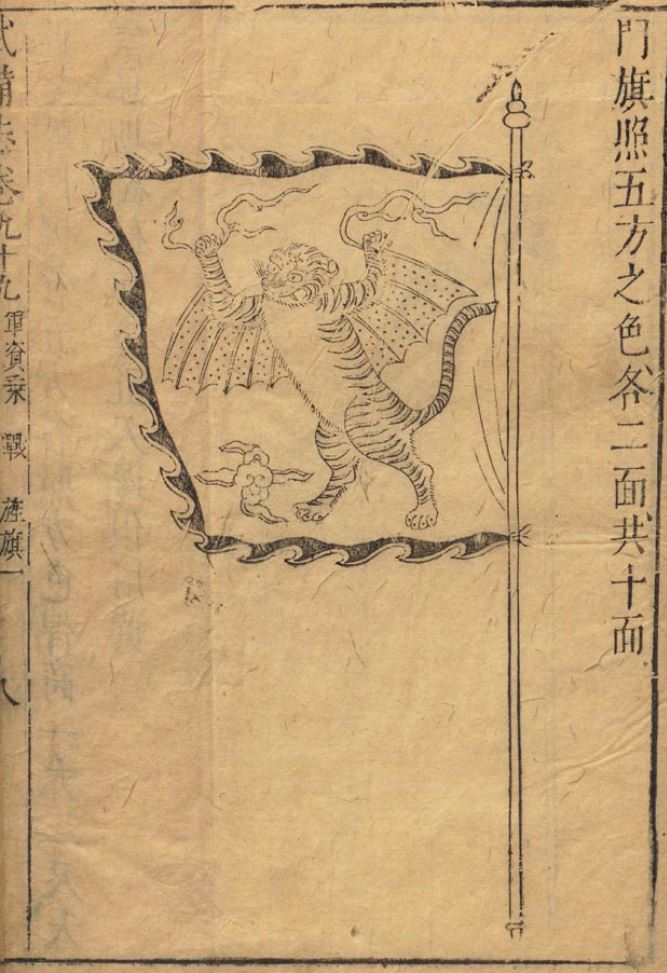
Ming dynasty

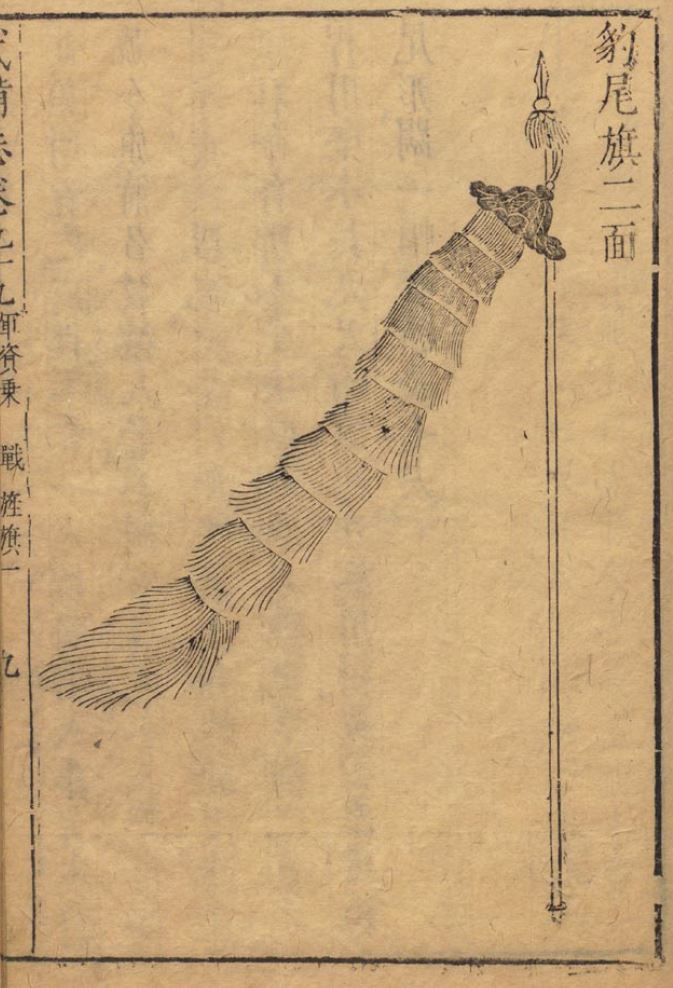
Ming dynasty

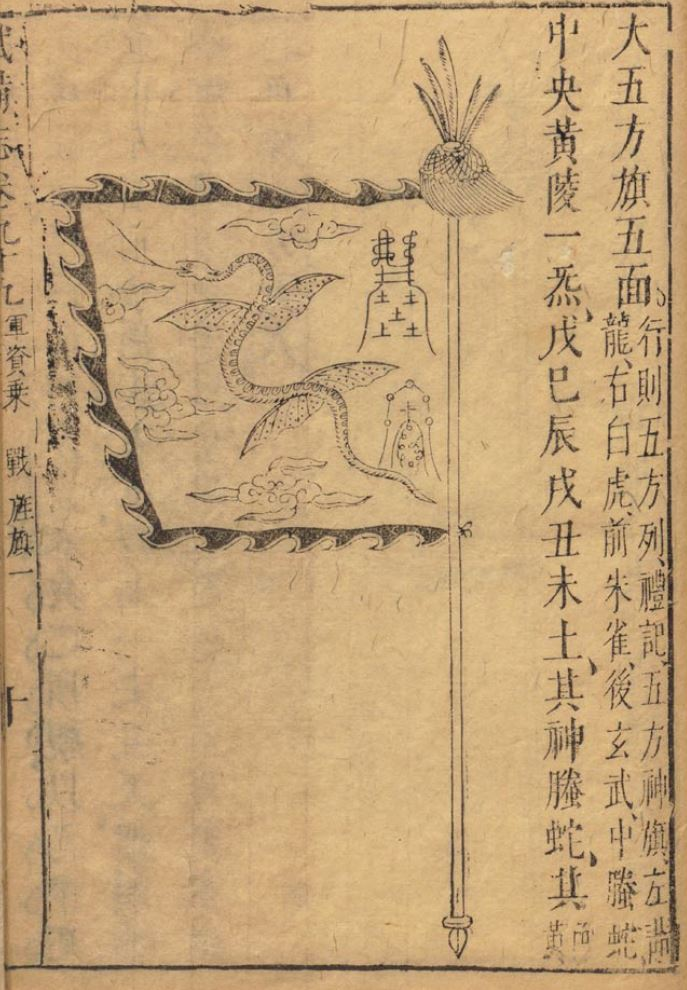
Ming dynasty

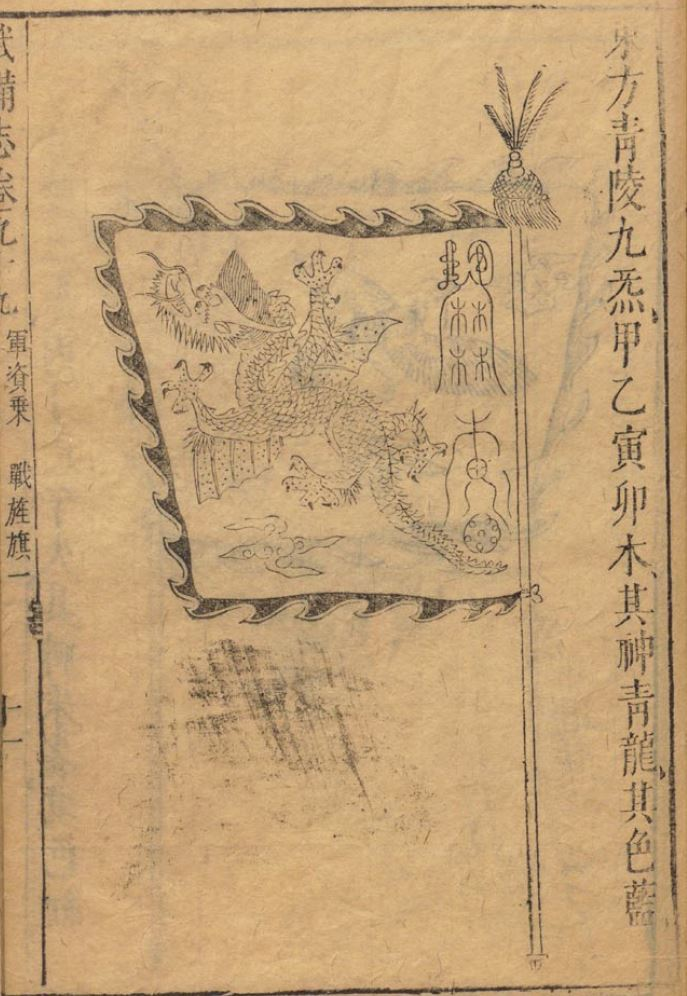
Ming dynasty

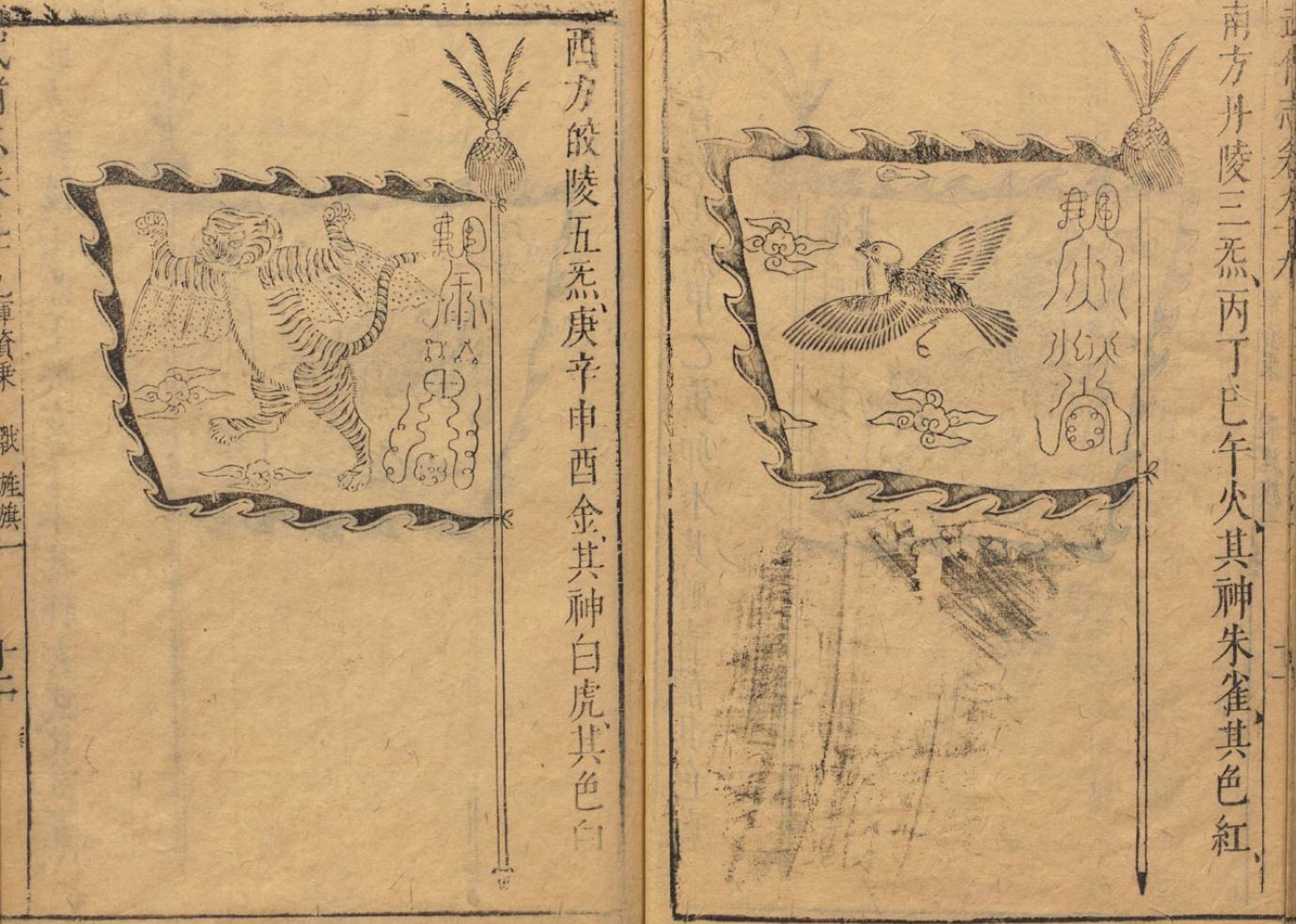
Ming dynasty

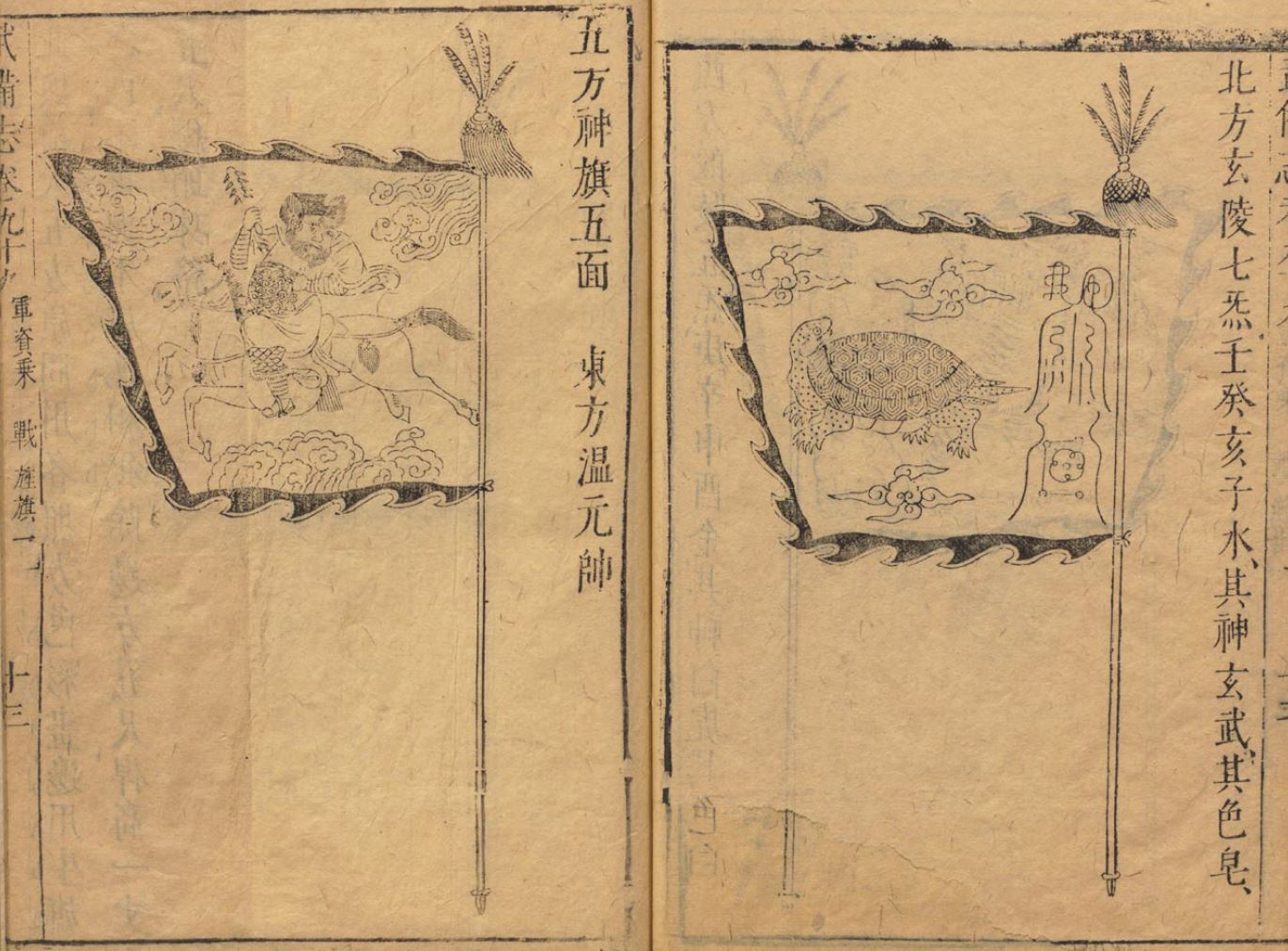
Ming dynasty

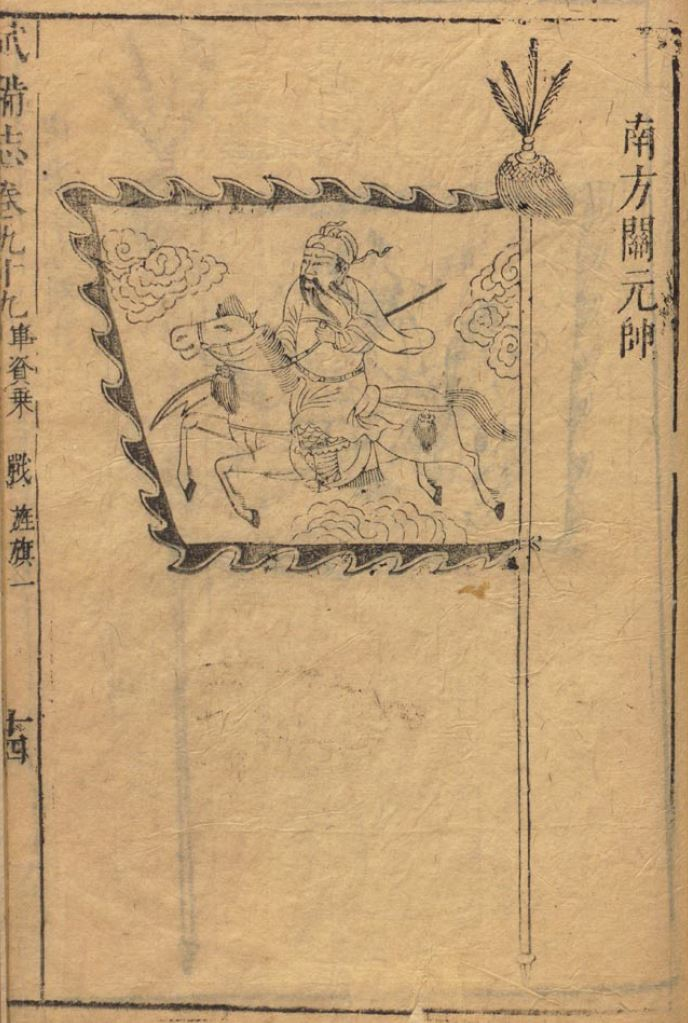
Ming dynasty

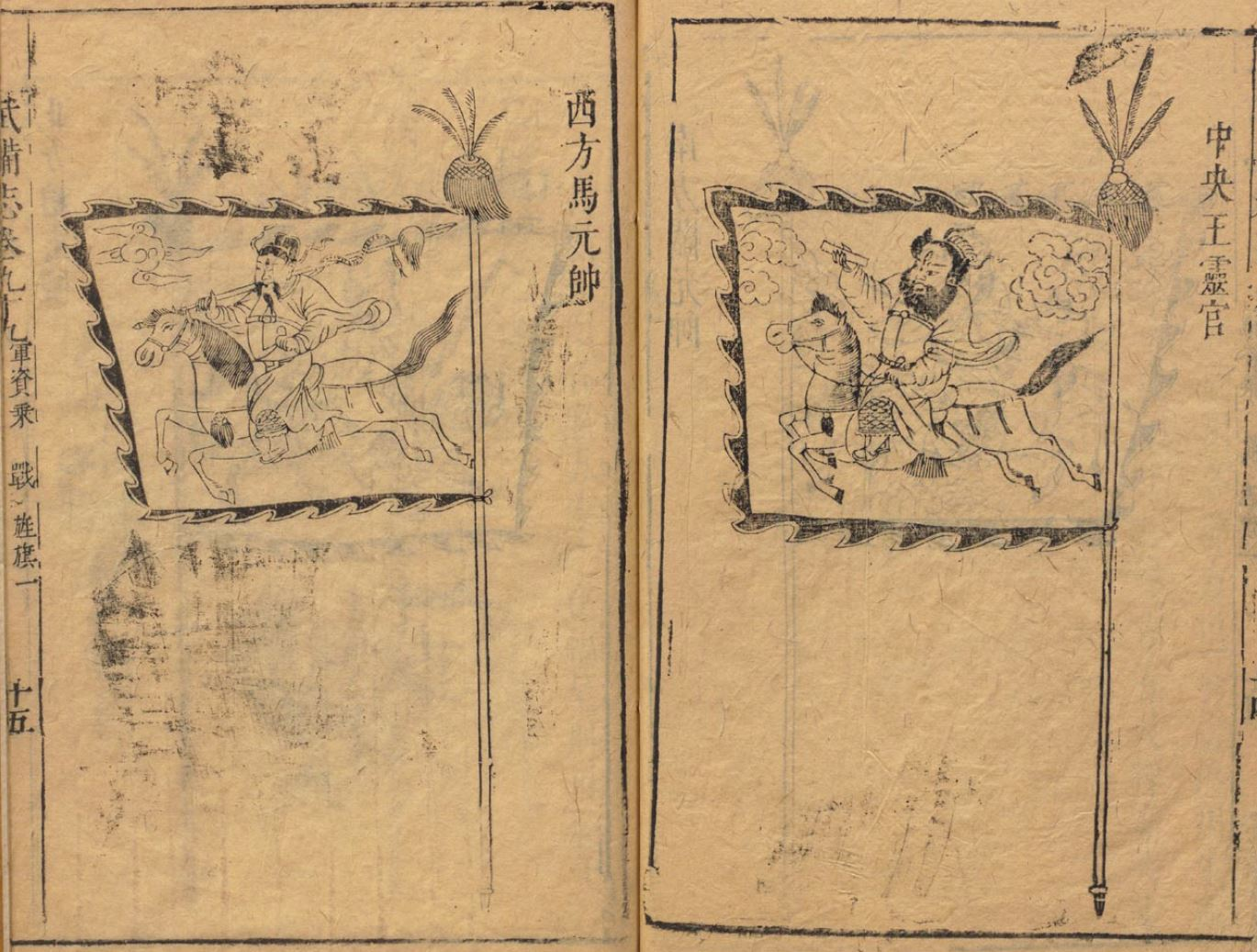
Ming dynasty

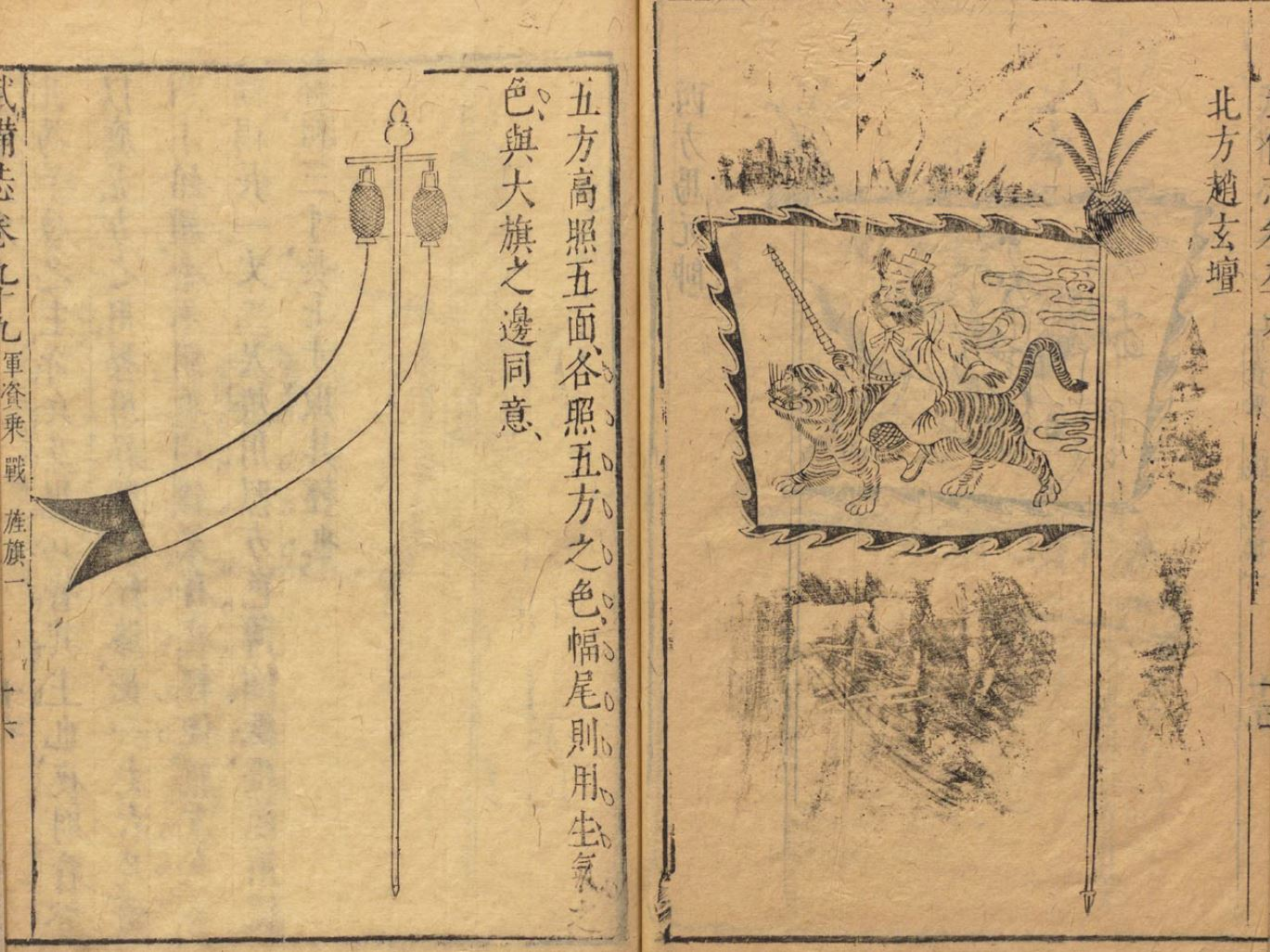
Ming dynasty

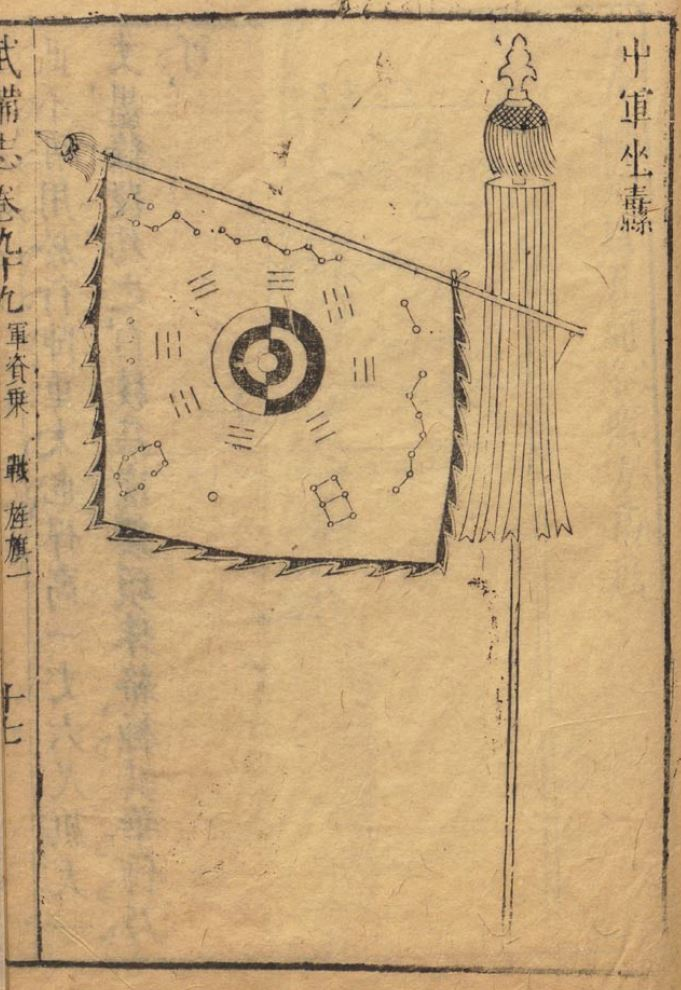
Ming dynasty

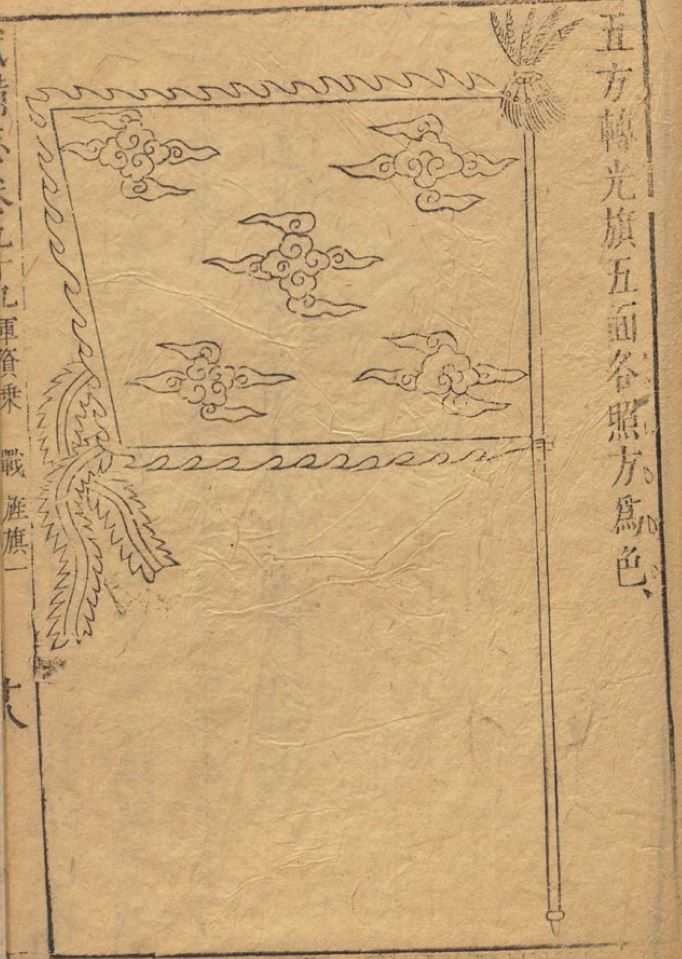
Ming dynasty

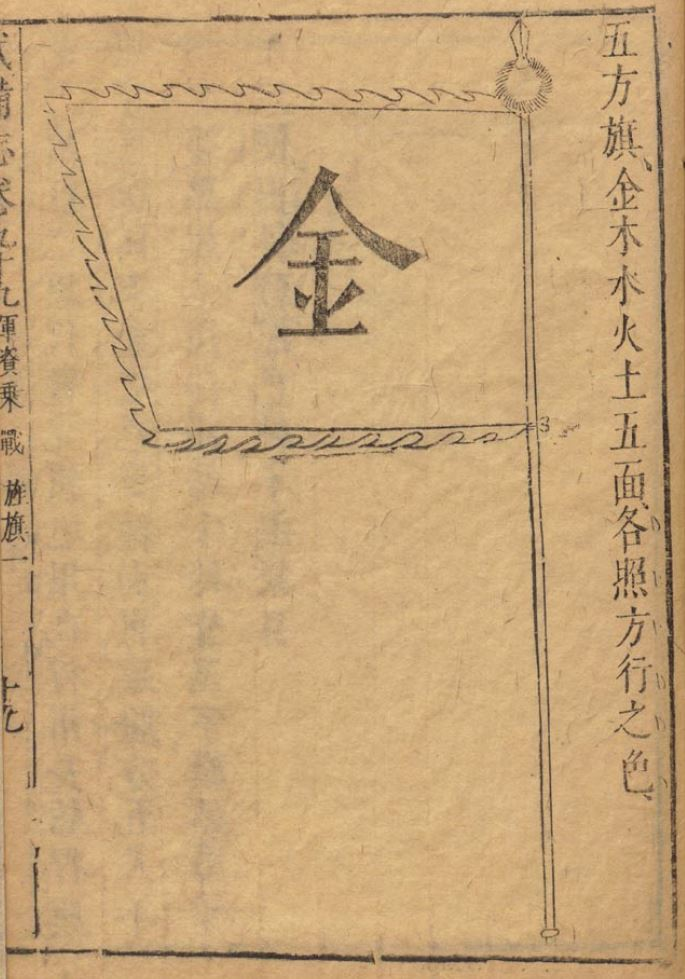
Ming dynasty

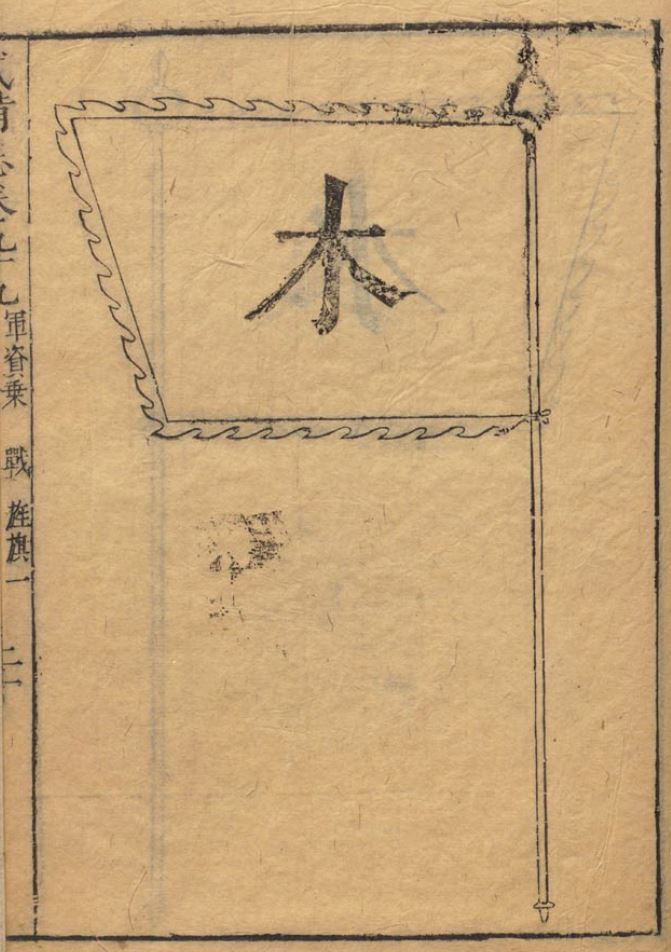
Ming dynasty

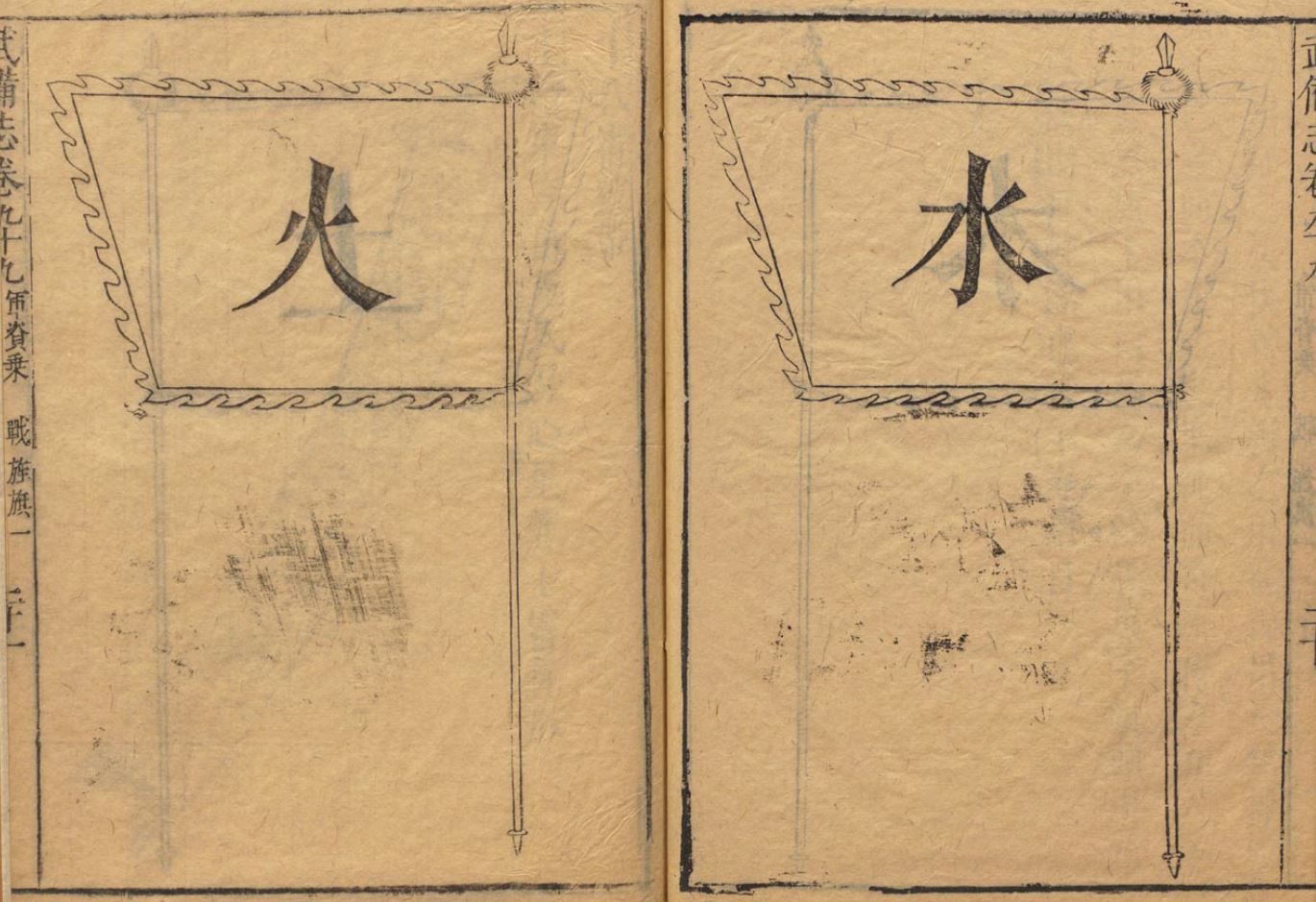
Ming dynasty

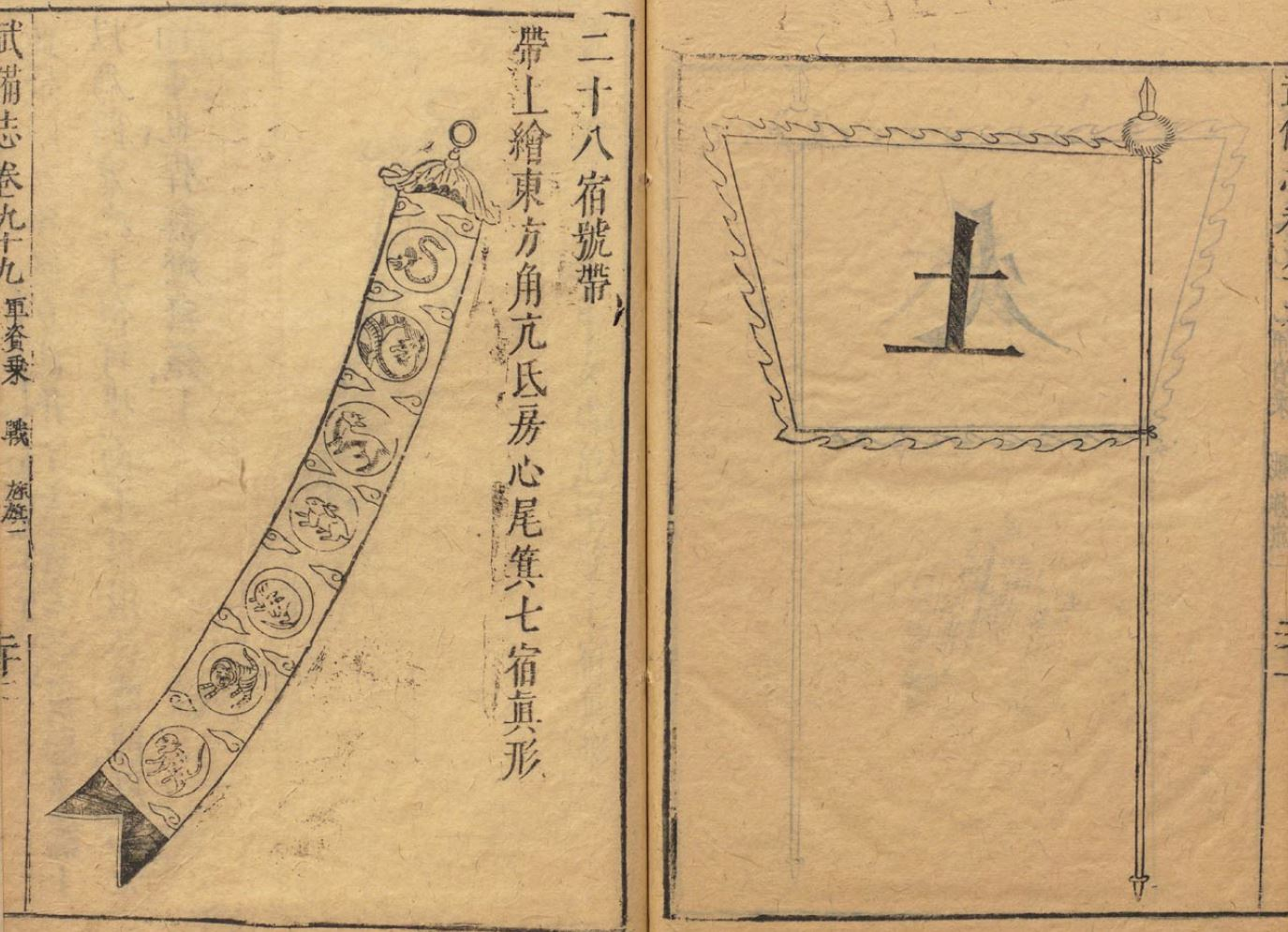
Ming dynasty

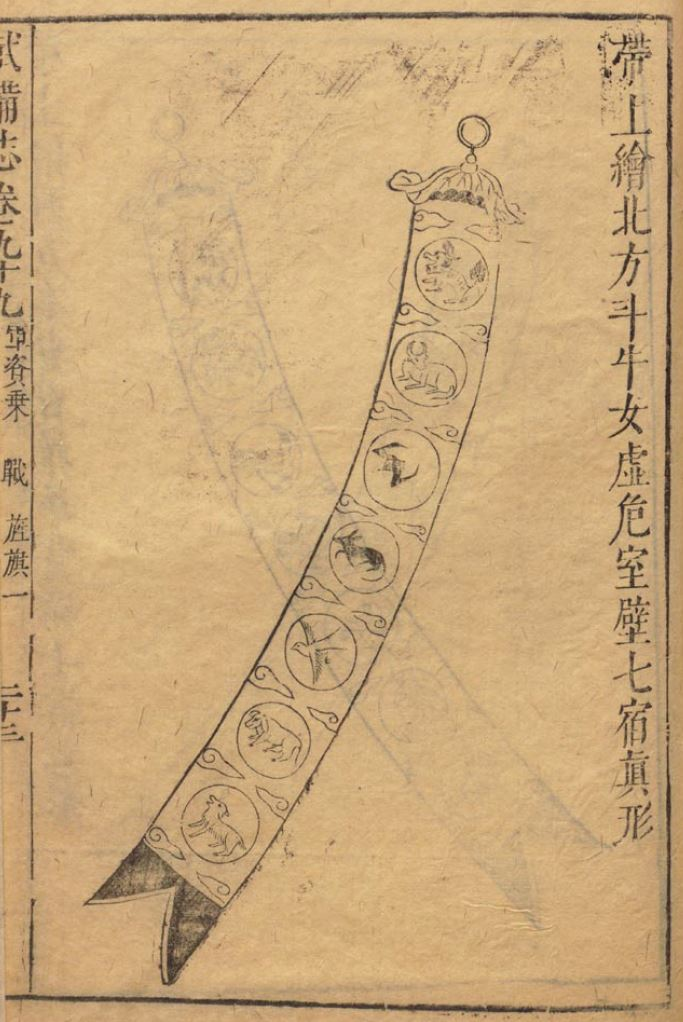
Ming dynasty

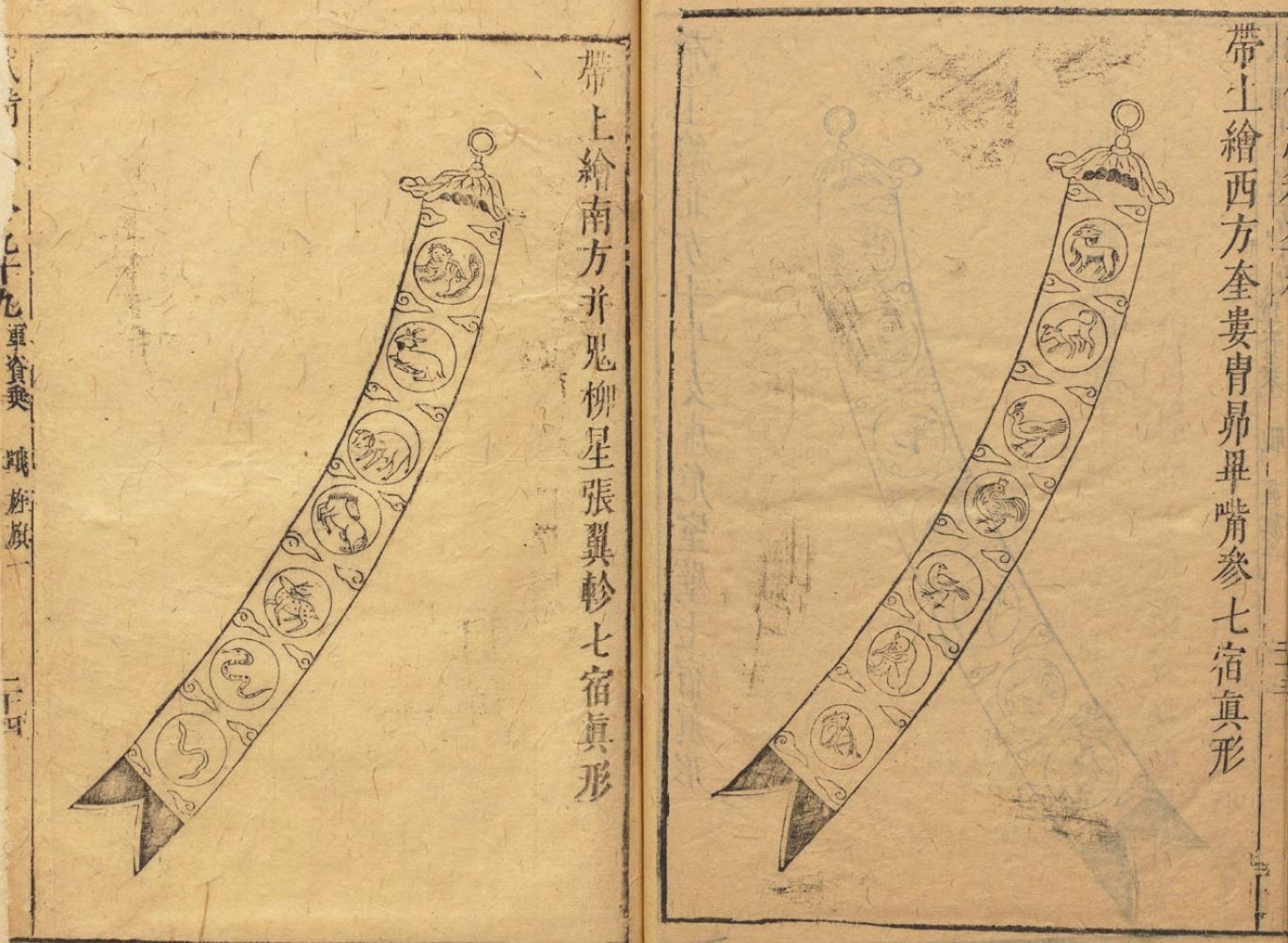
Ming dynasty

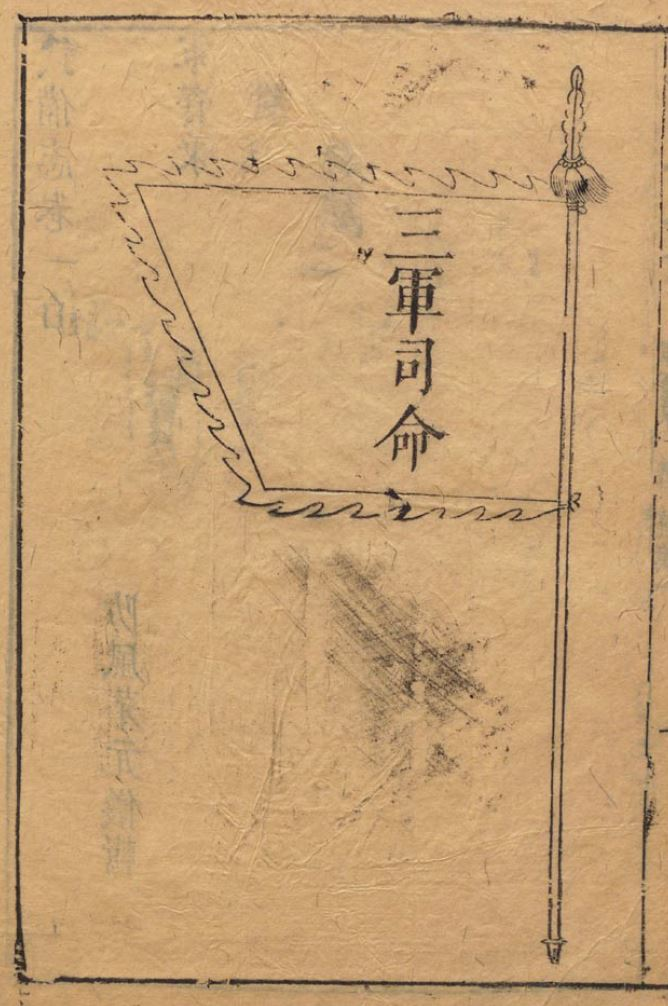
Ming dynasty

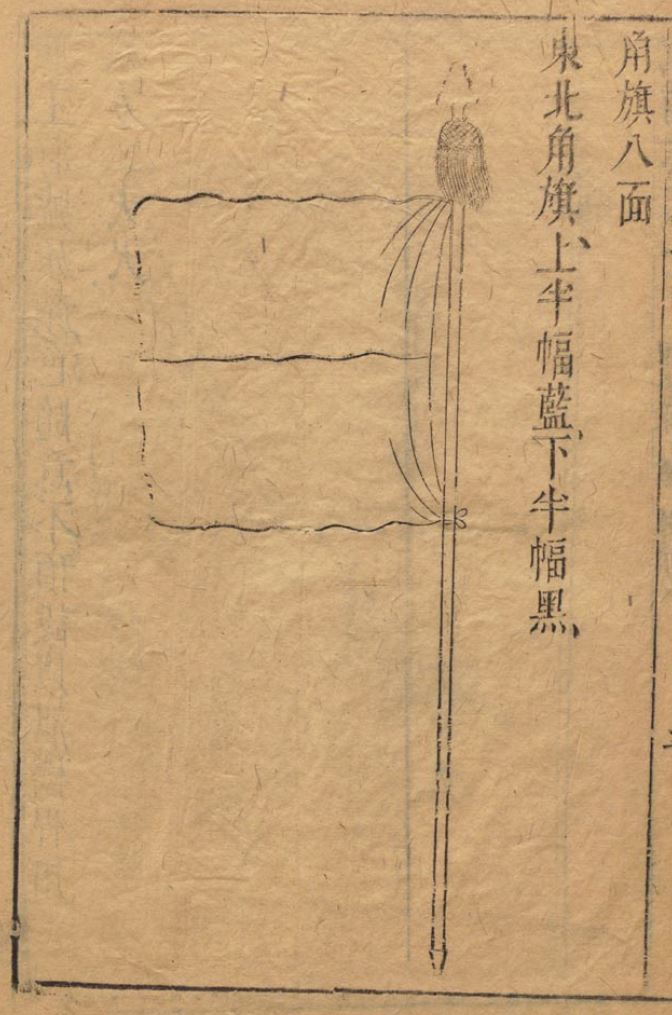
Ming dynasty

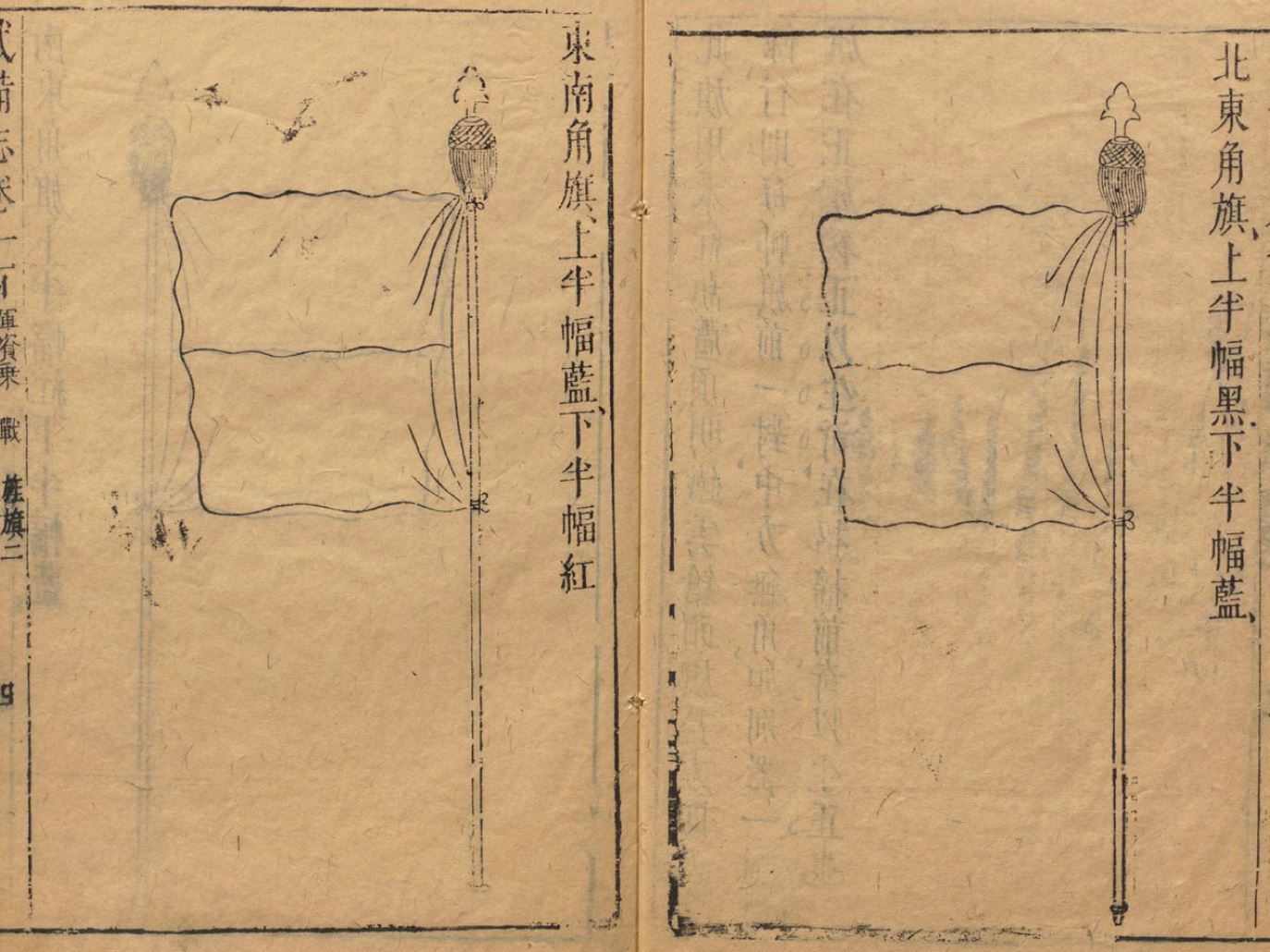
Ming dynasty

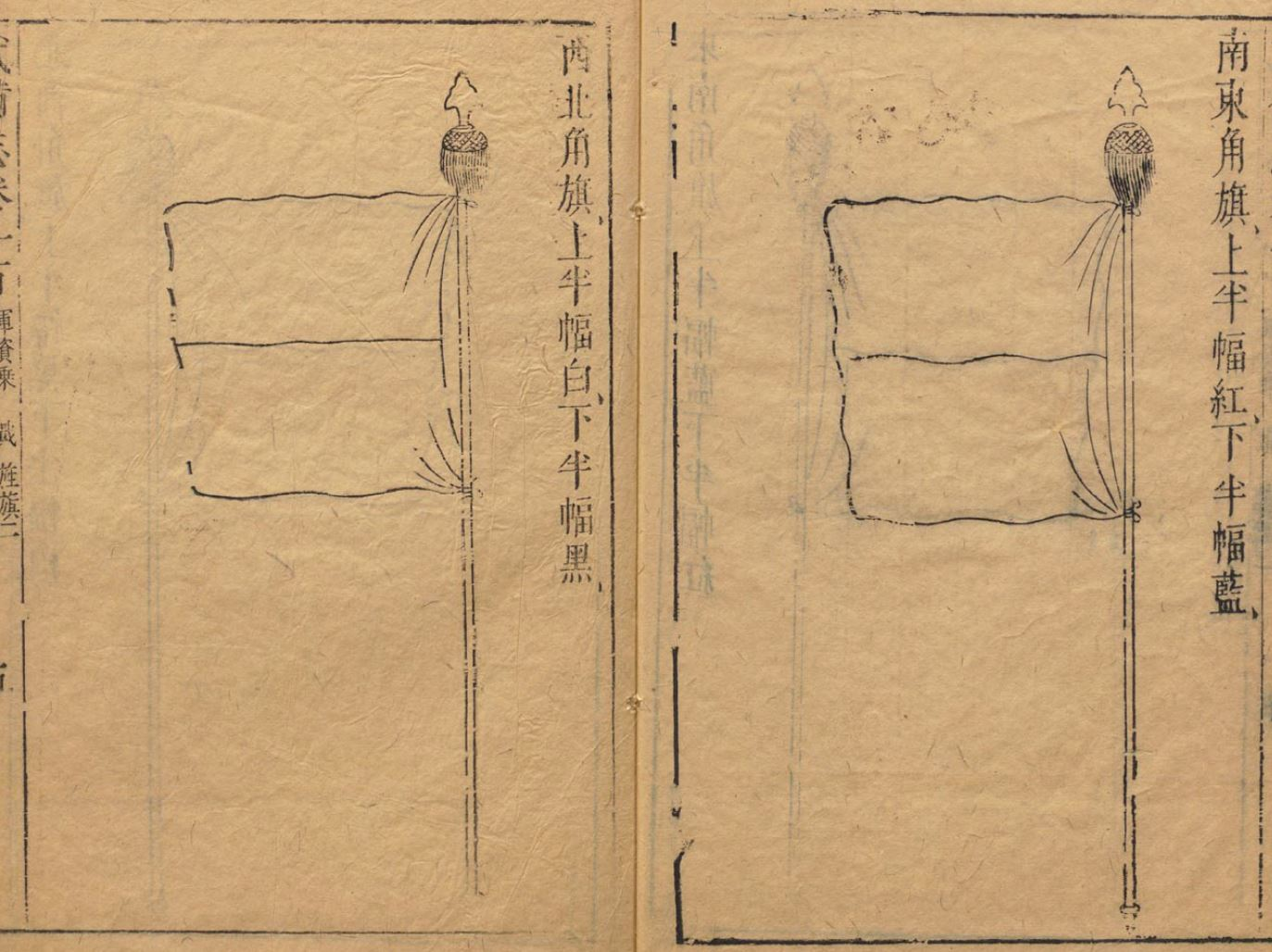
Ming dynasty

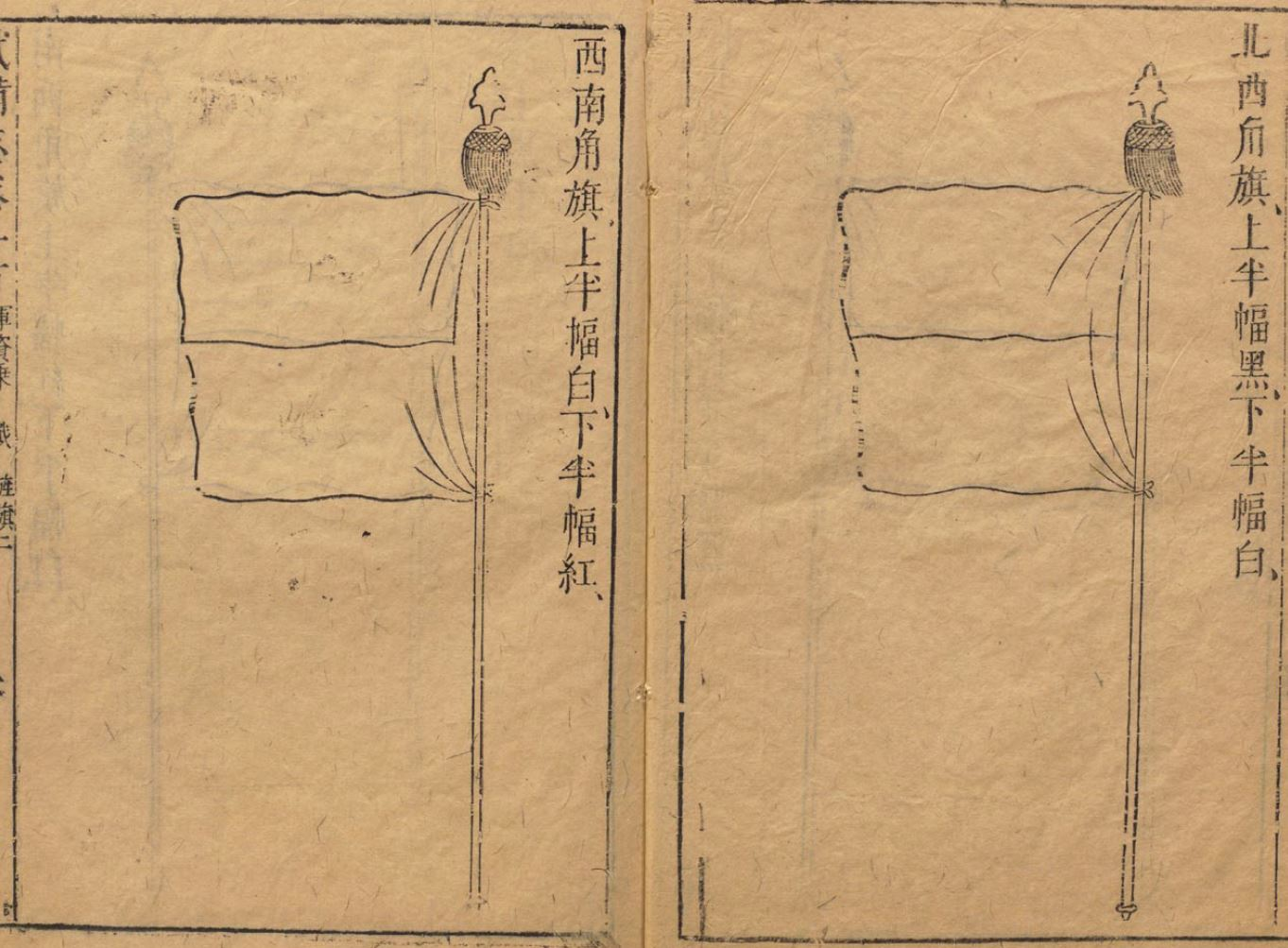
Ming dynasty

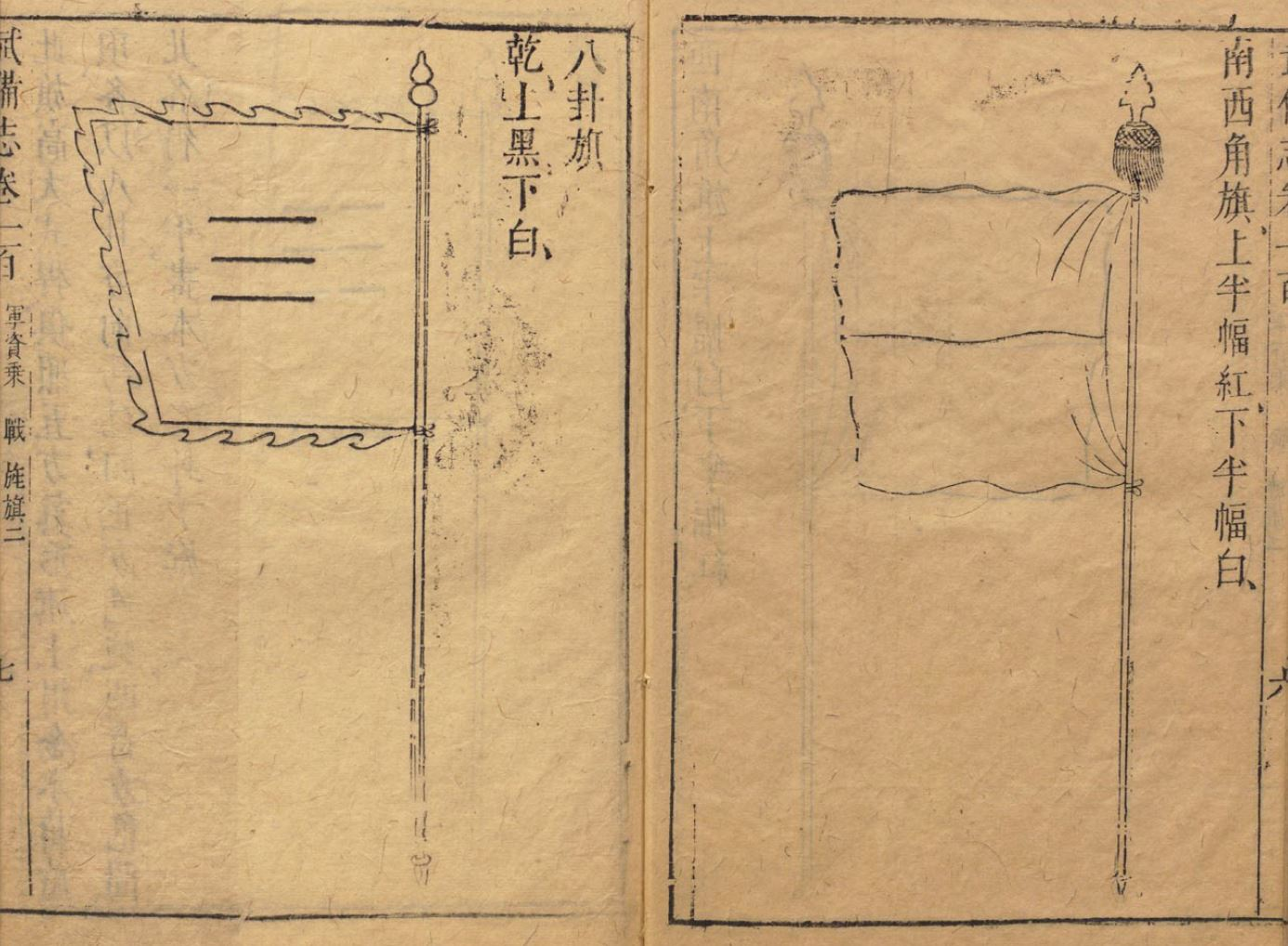
Ming dynasty

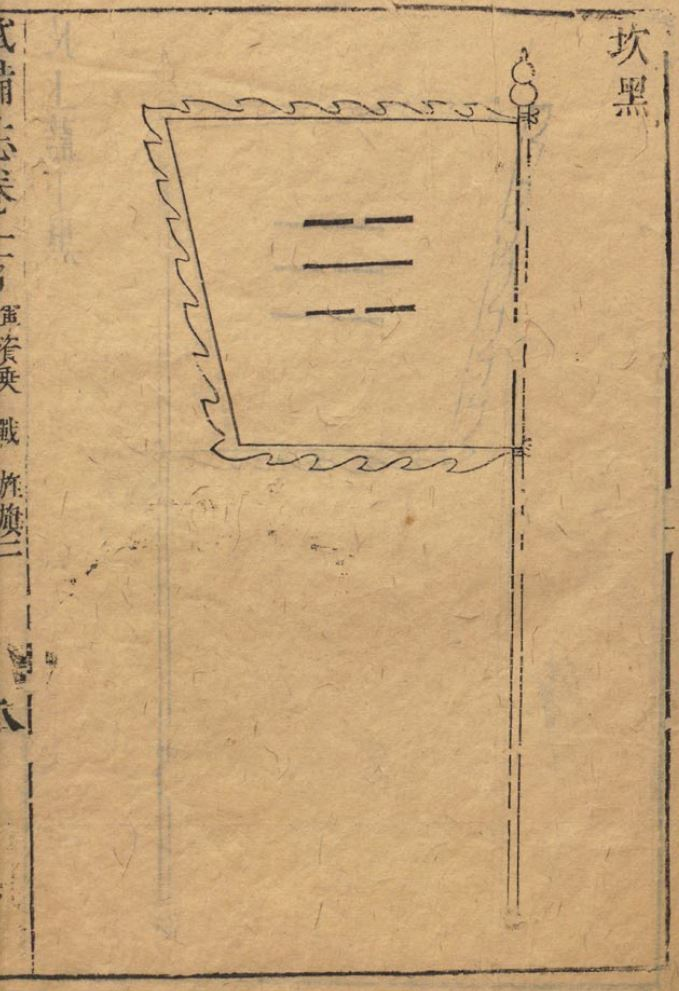
Ming dynasty

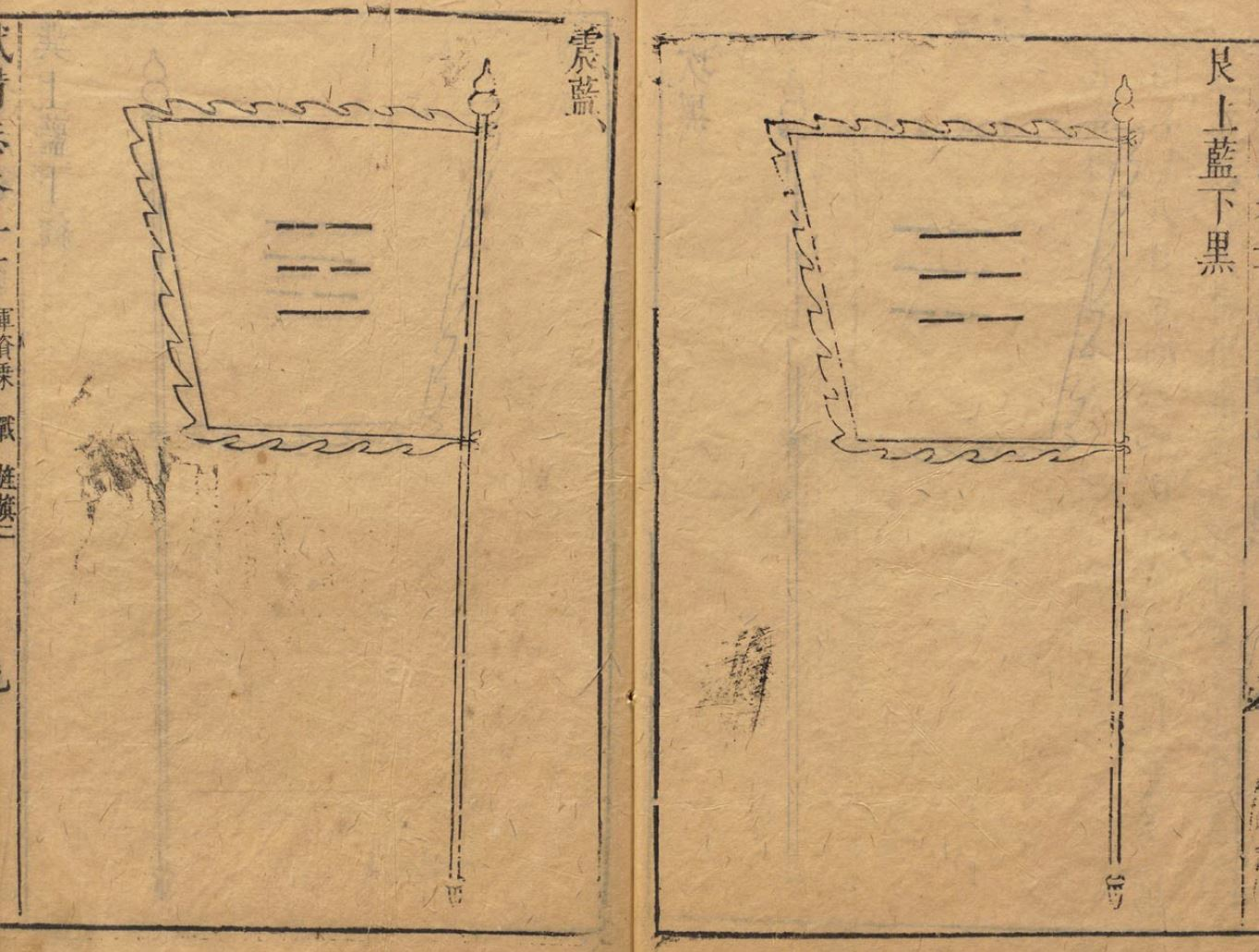
Ming dynasty

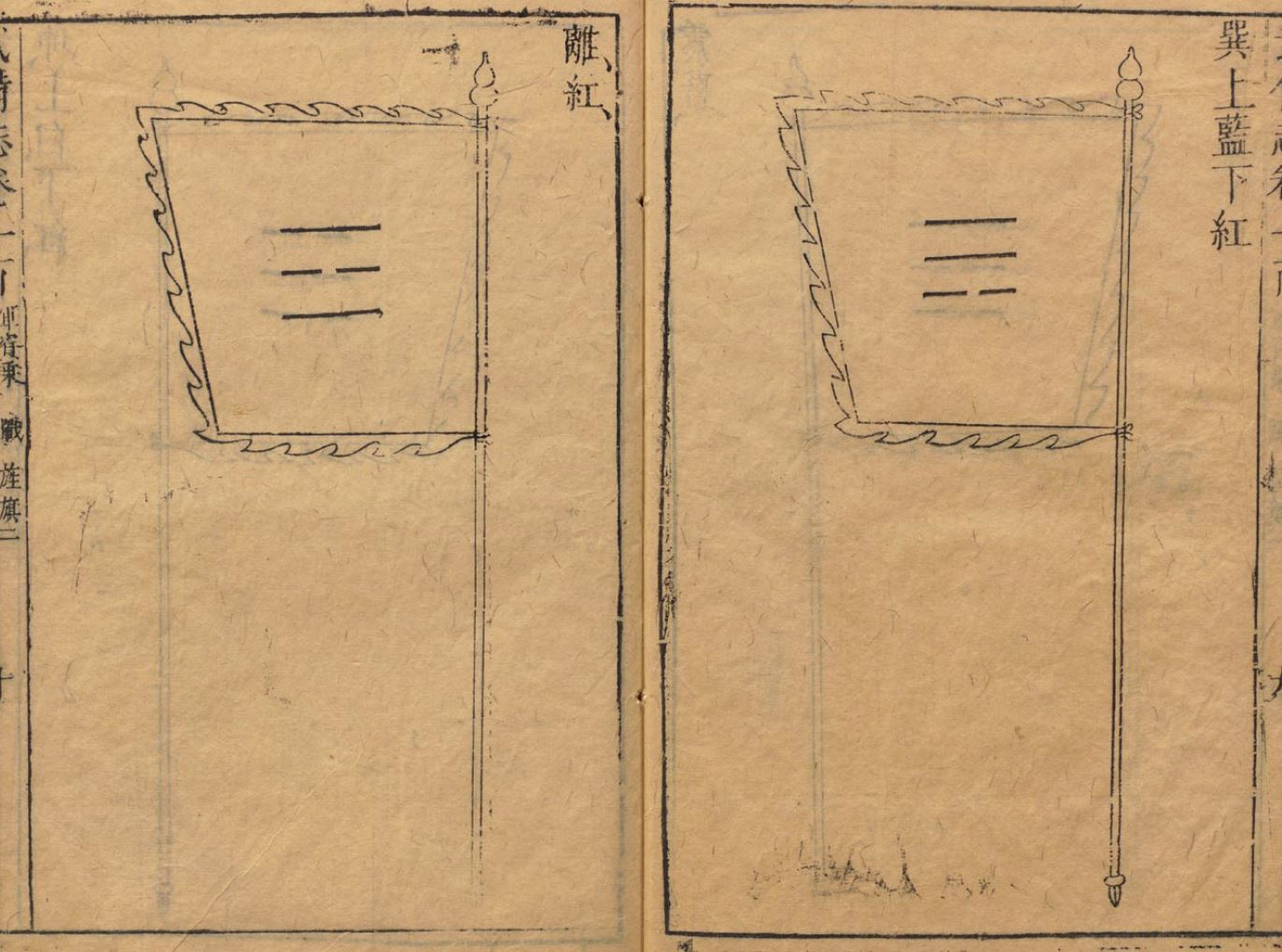
Ming dynasty

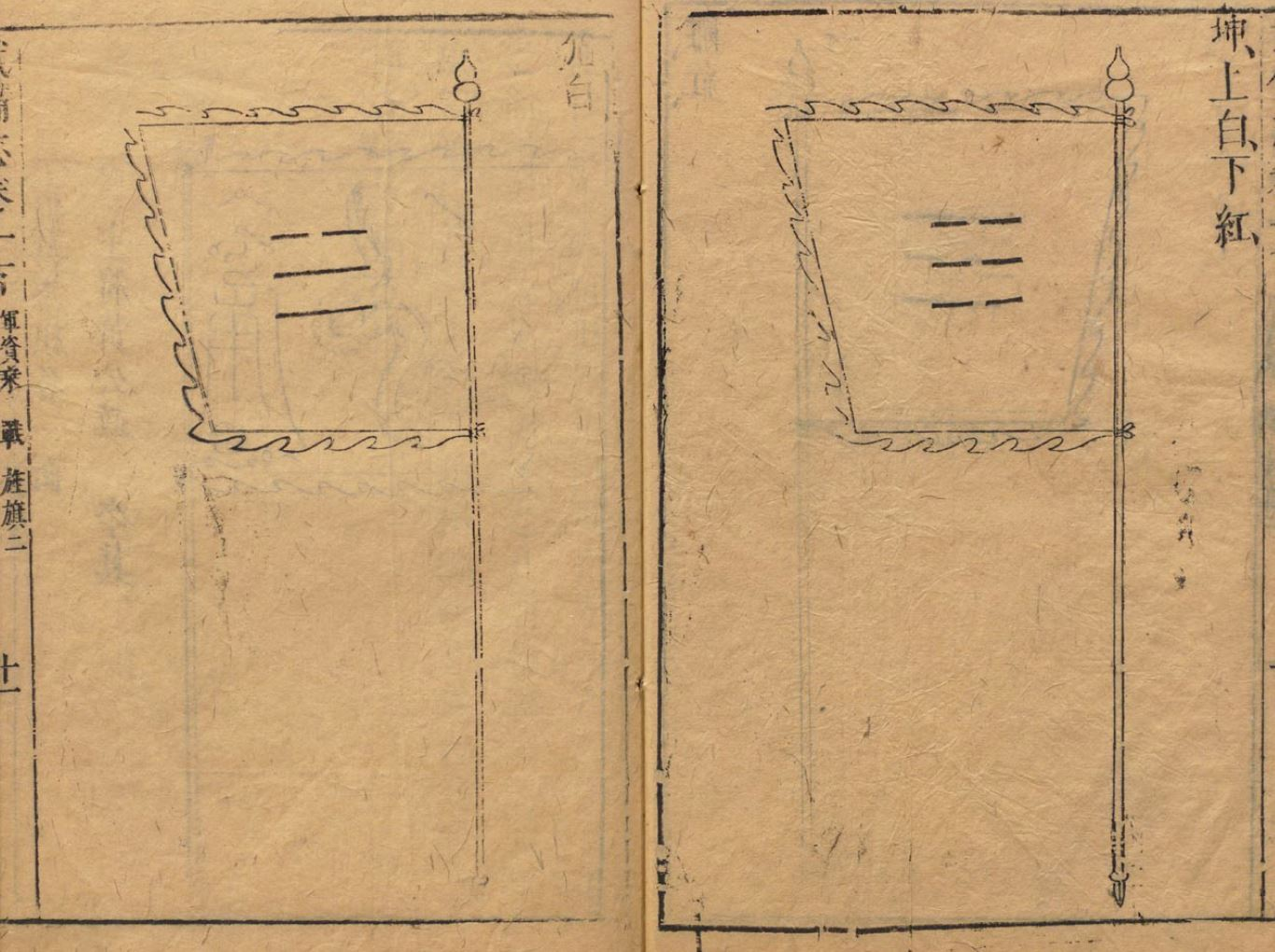
Ming dynasty

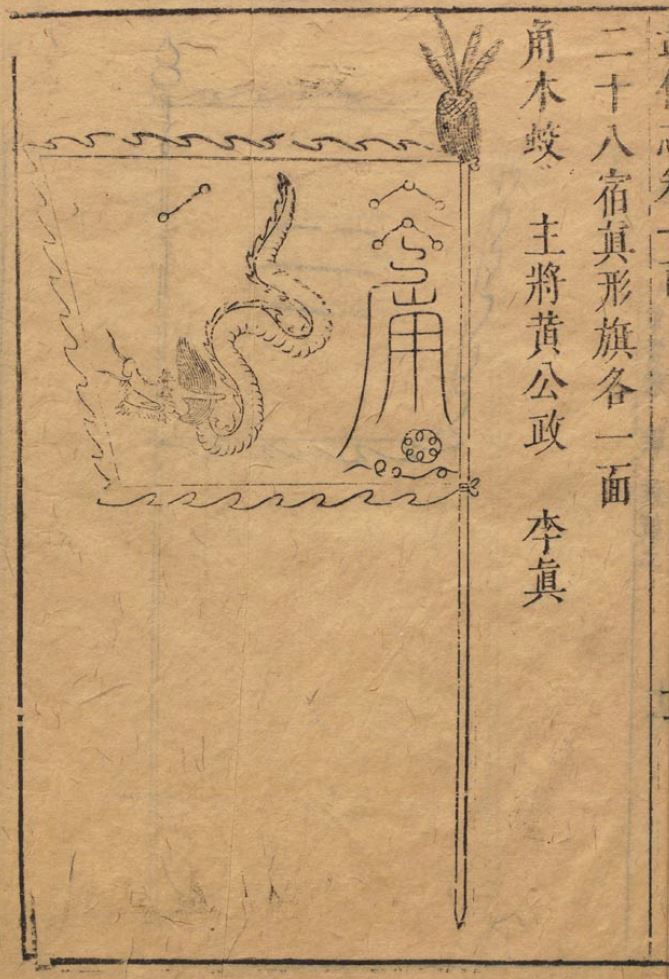
Ming dynasty

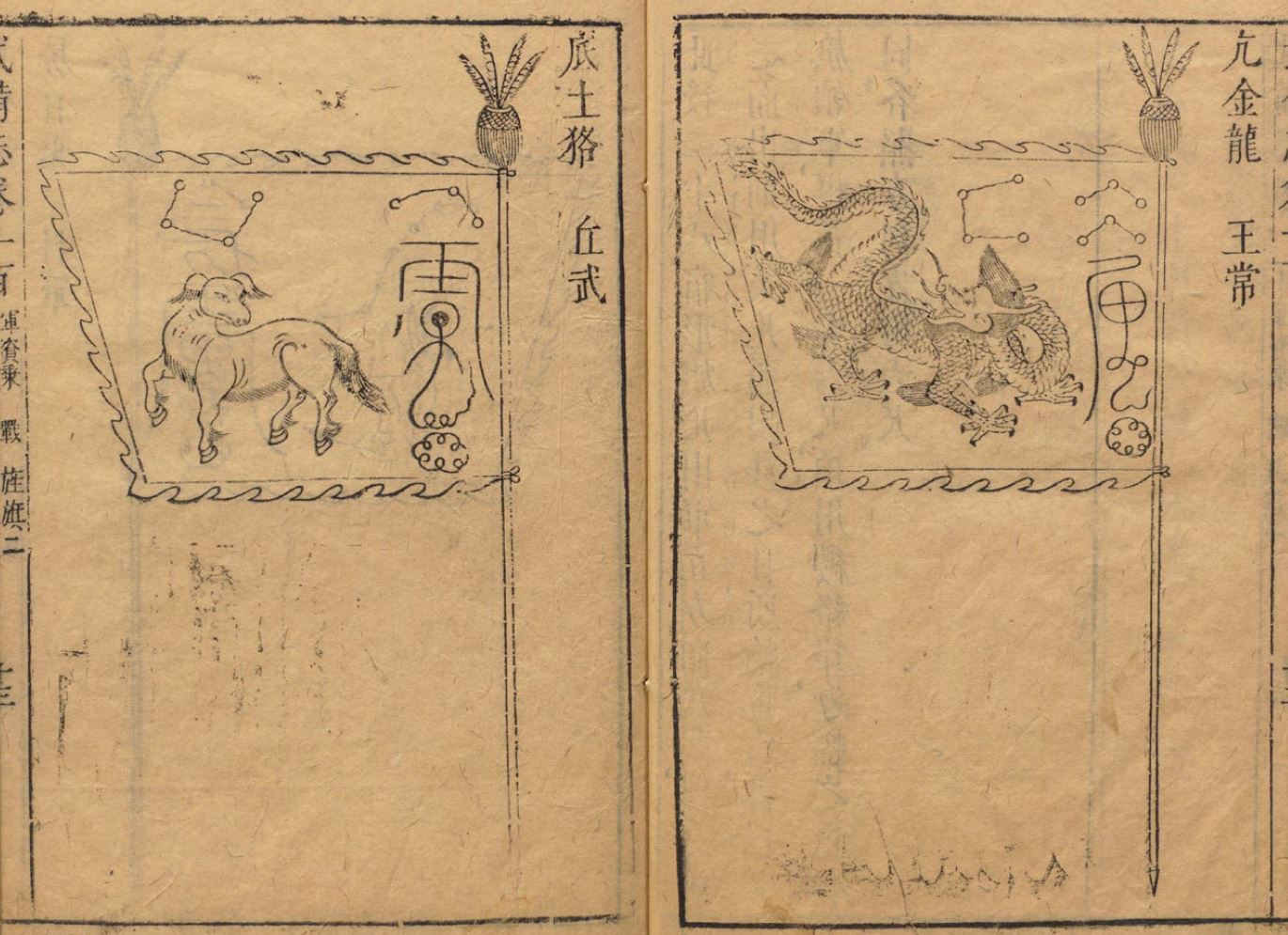
Ming dynasty

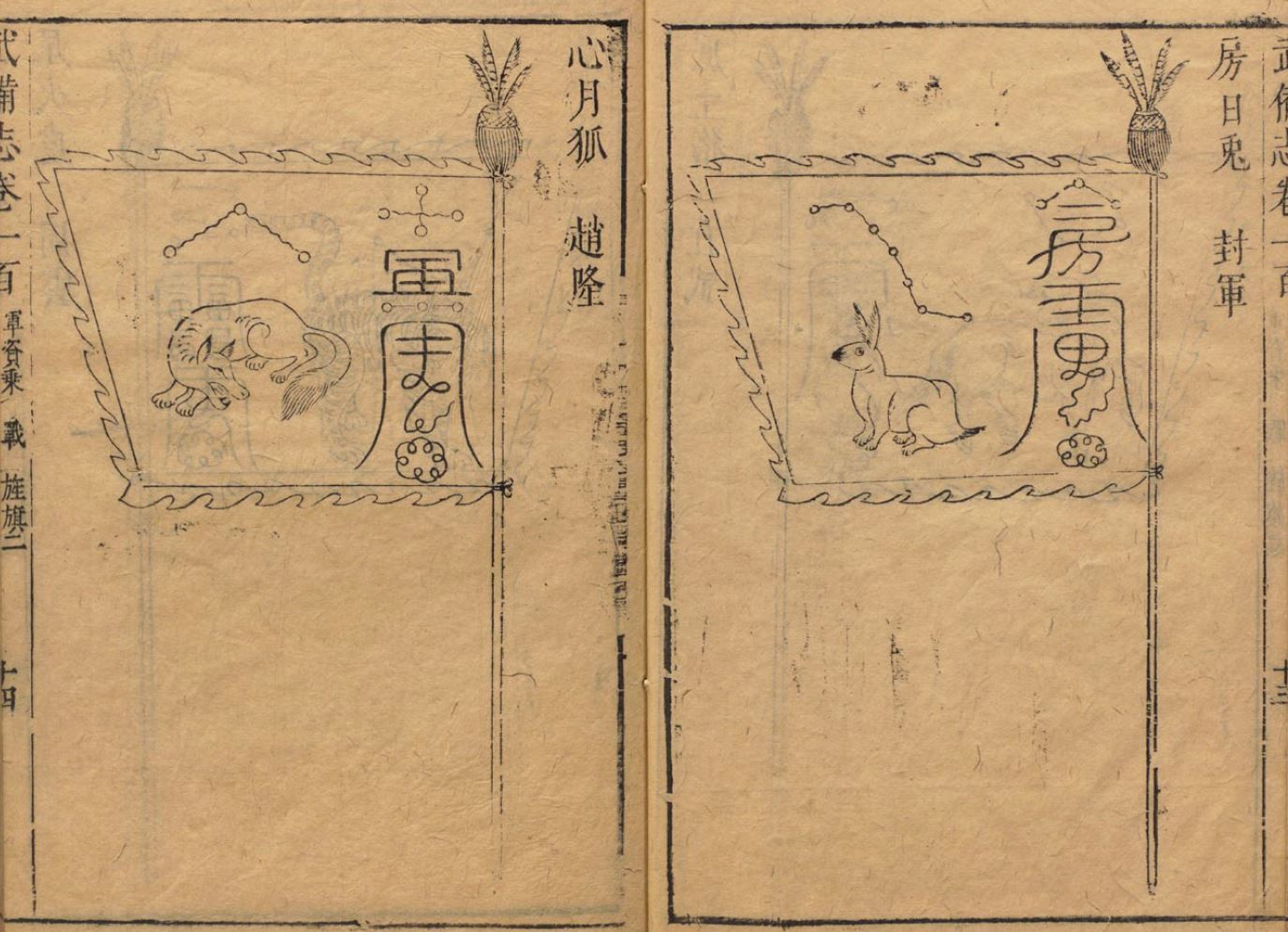
Ming dynasty

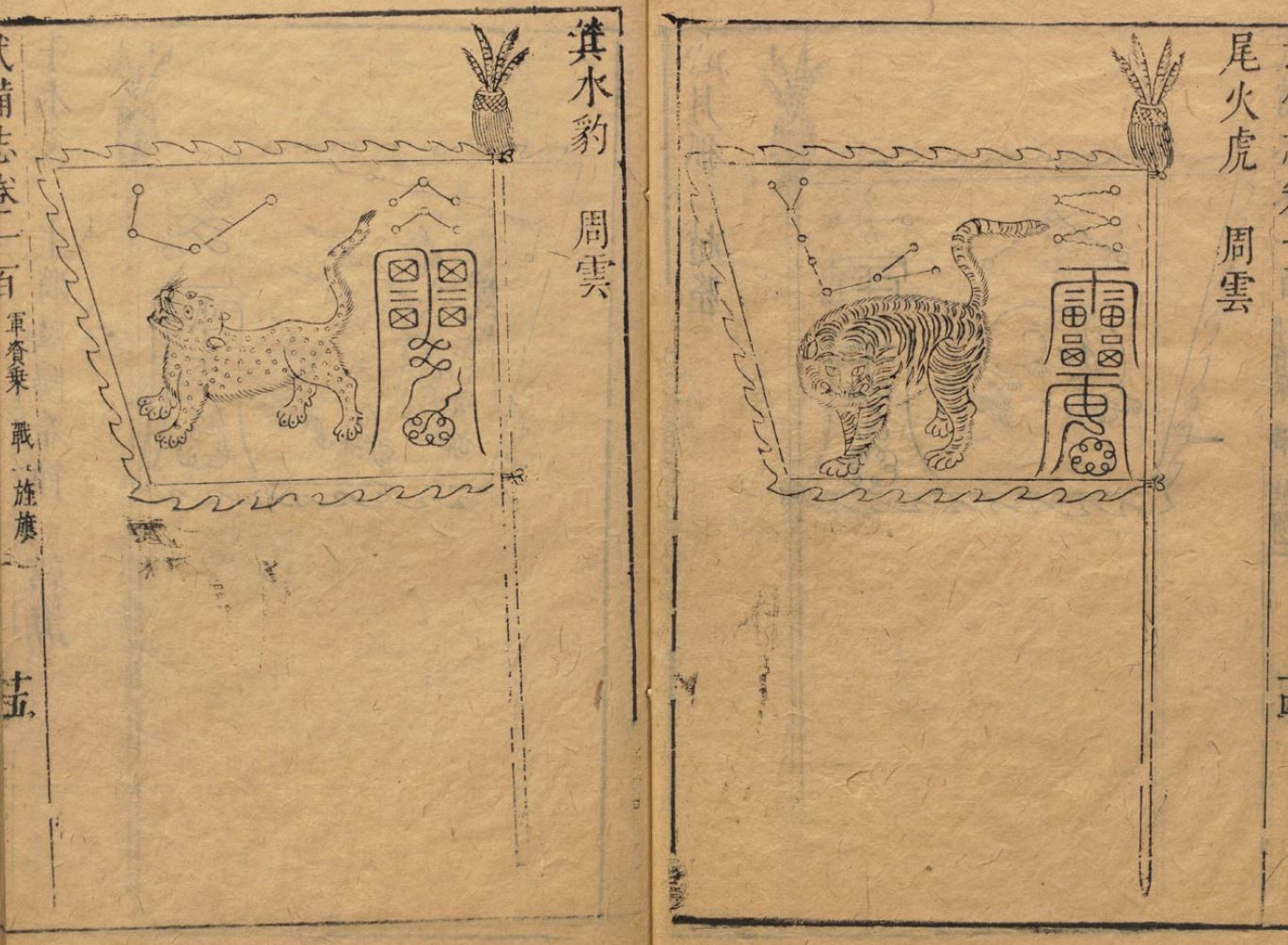
Ming dynasty

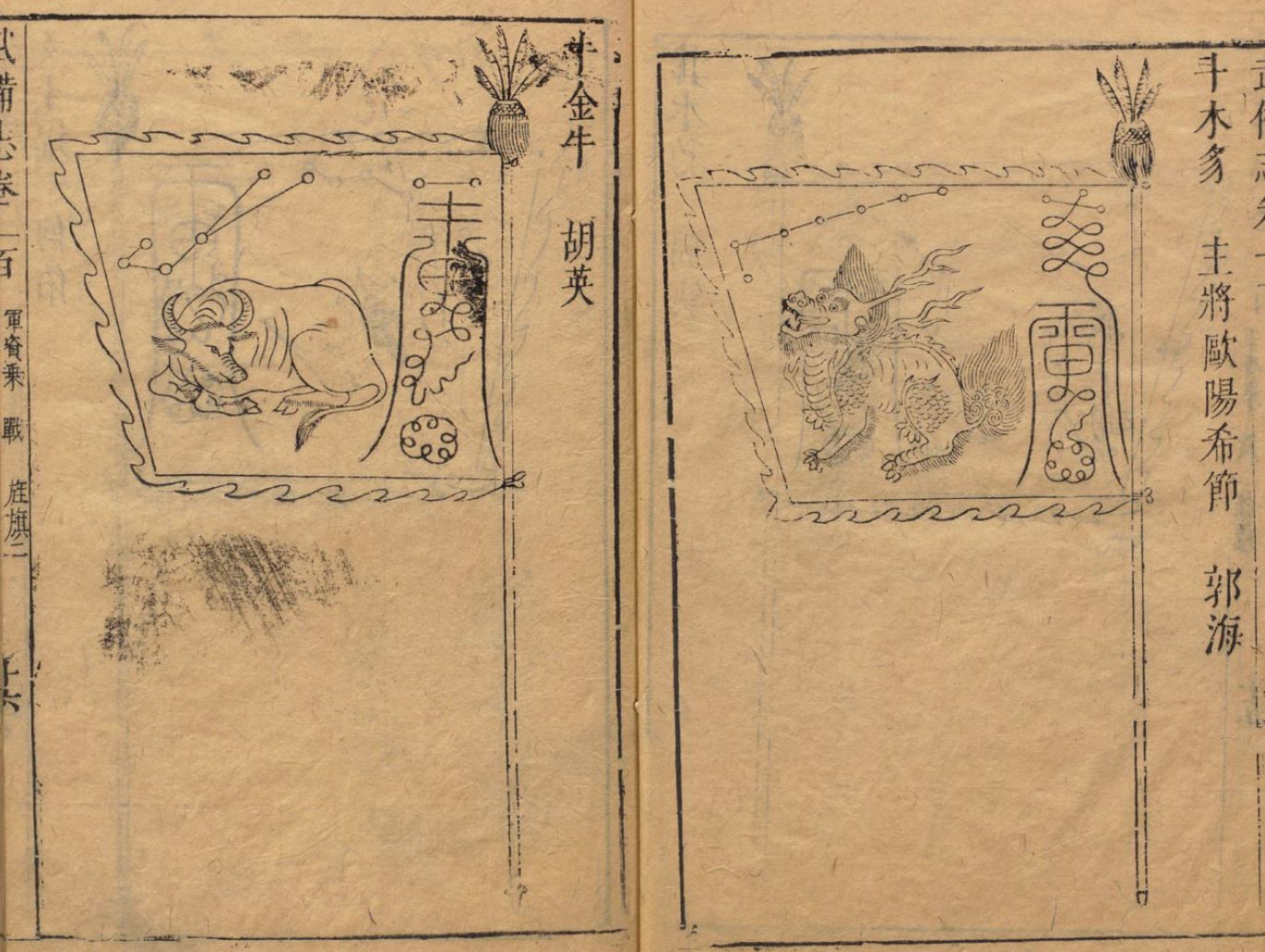
Ming dynasty

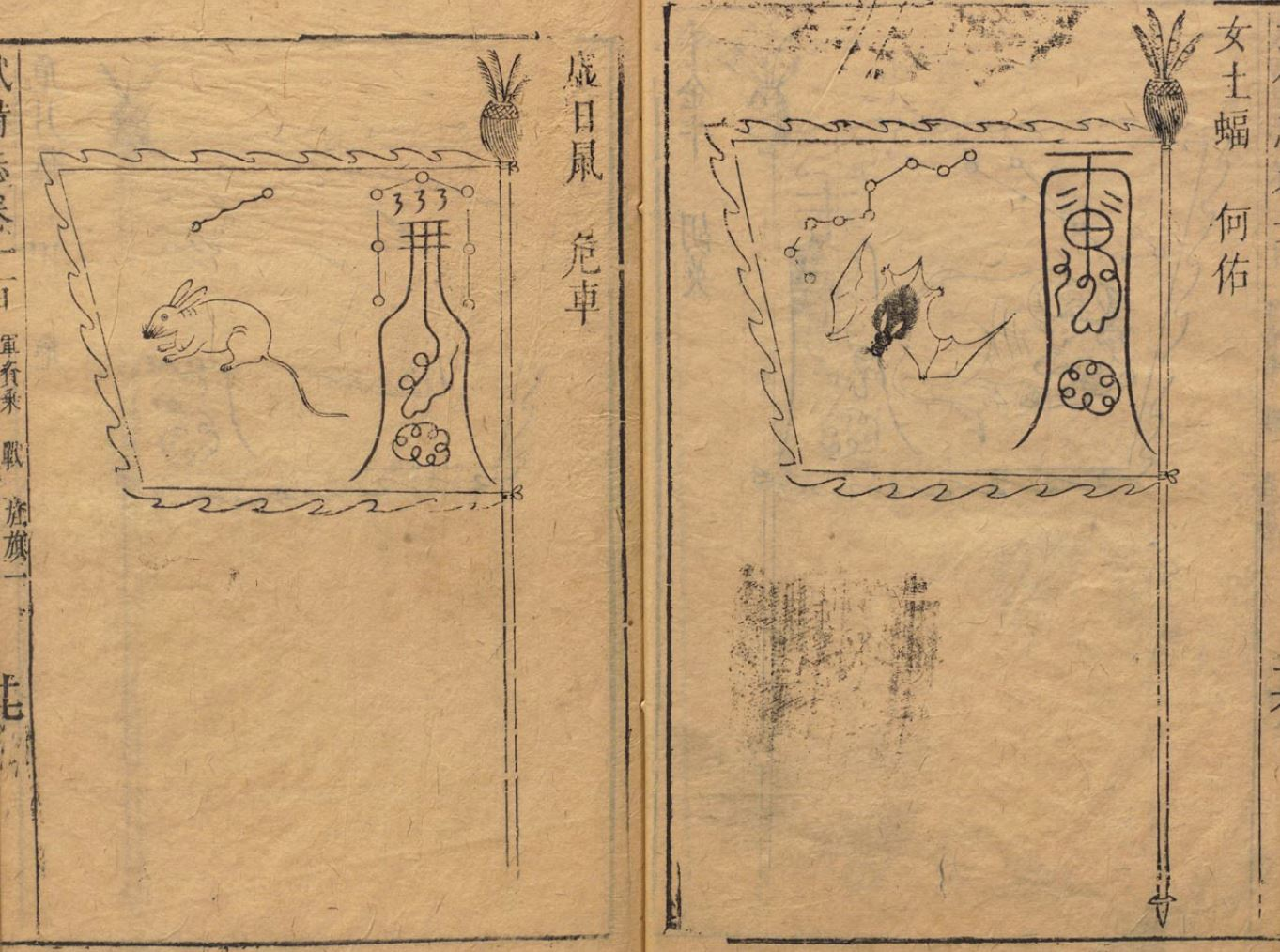
Ming dynasty

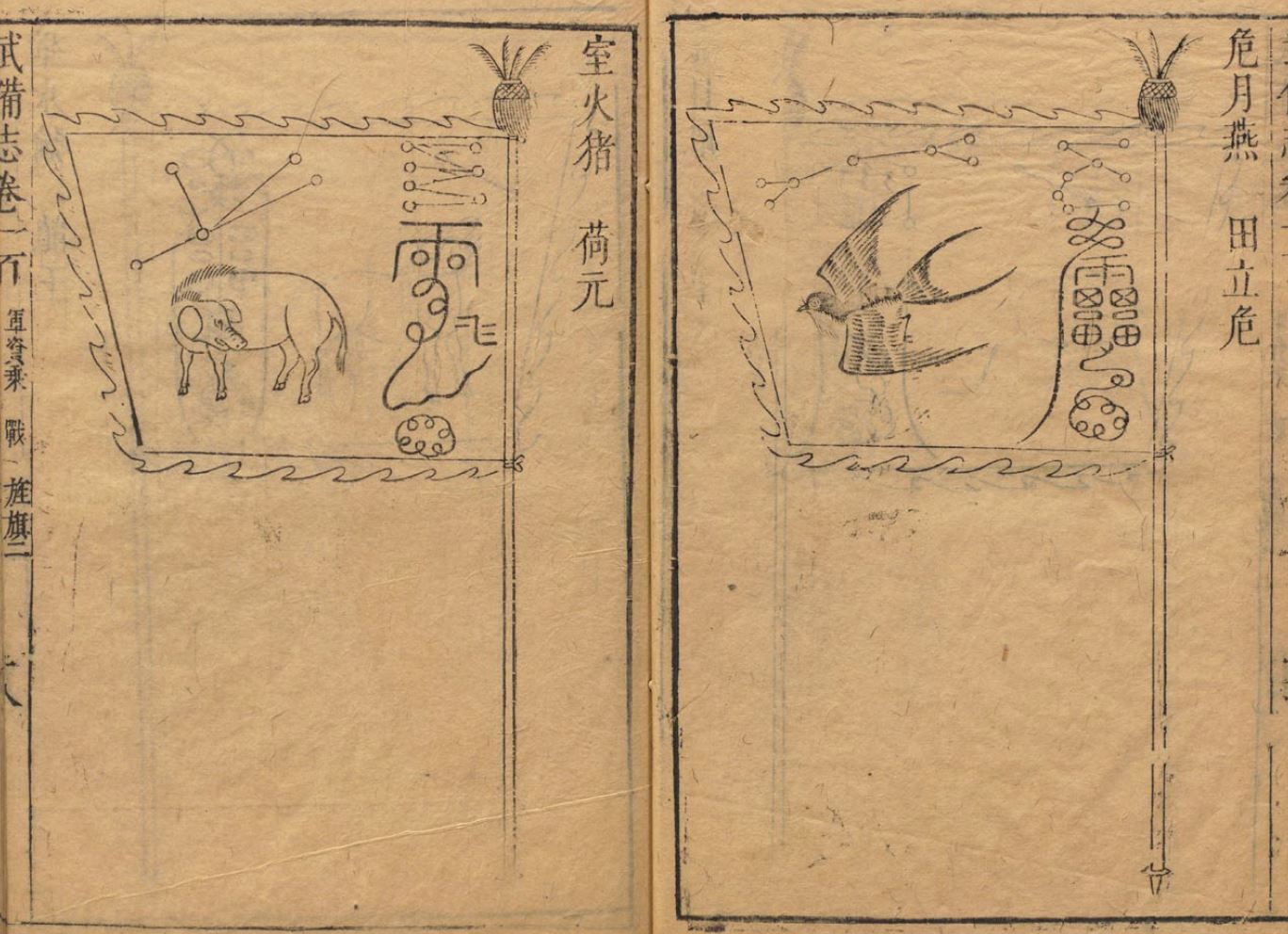
Ming dynasty

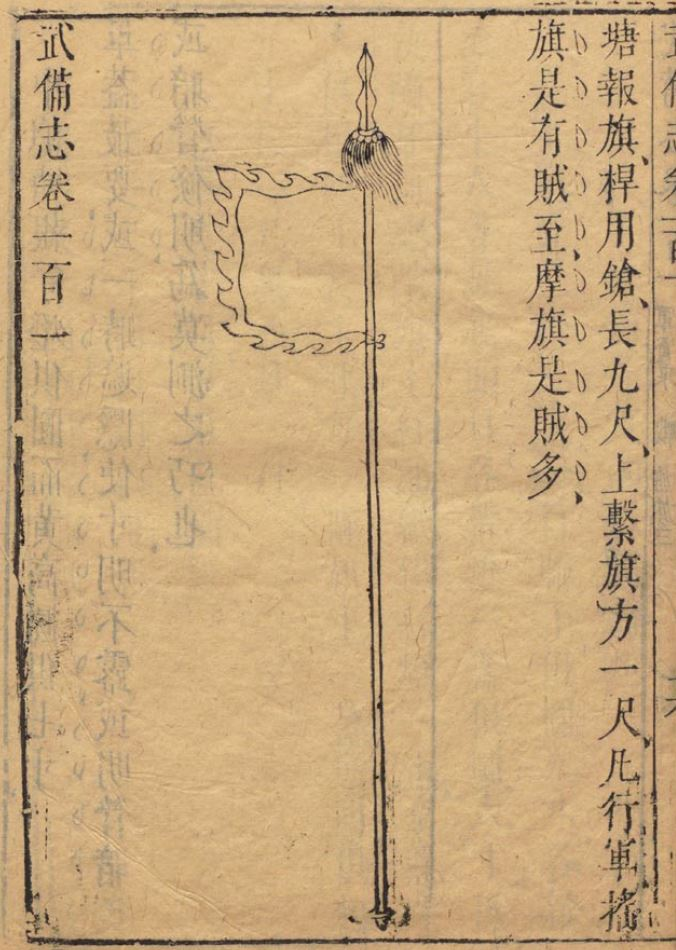
Ming dynasty

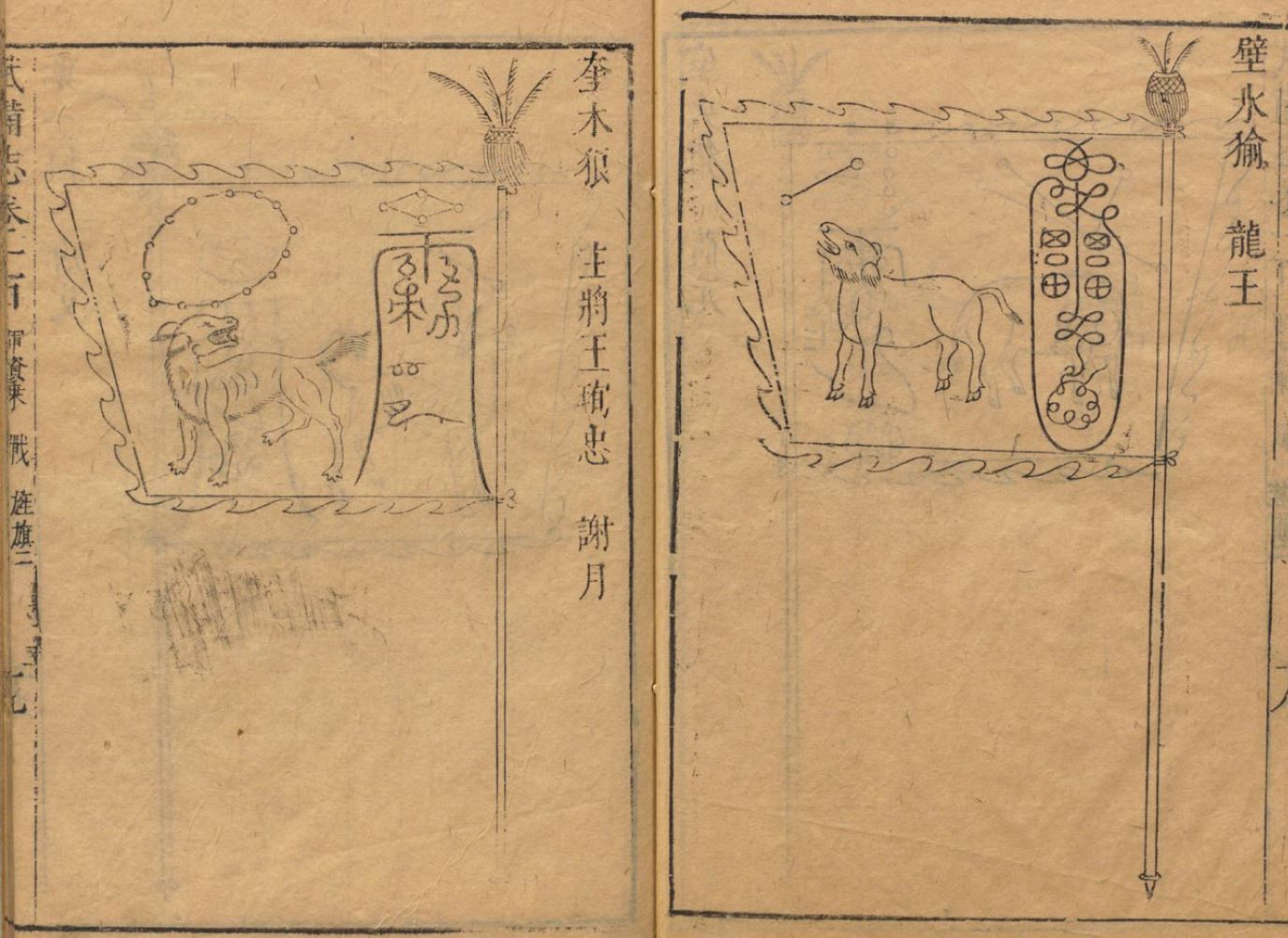
Ming dynasty

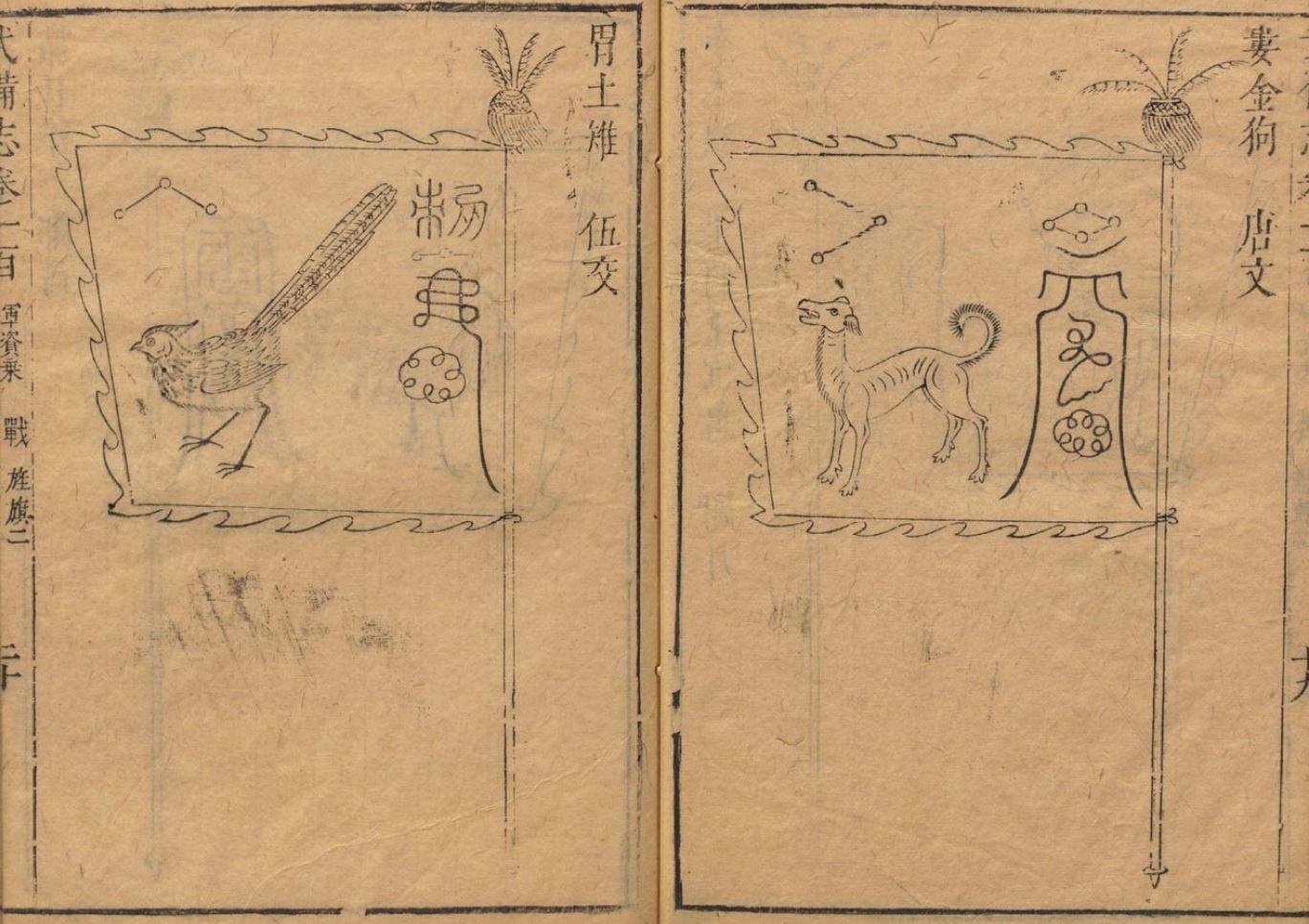
Ming dynasty

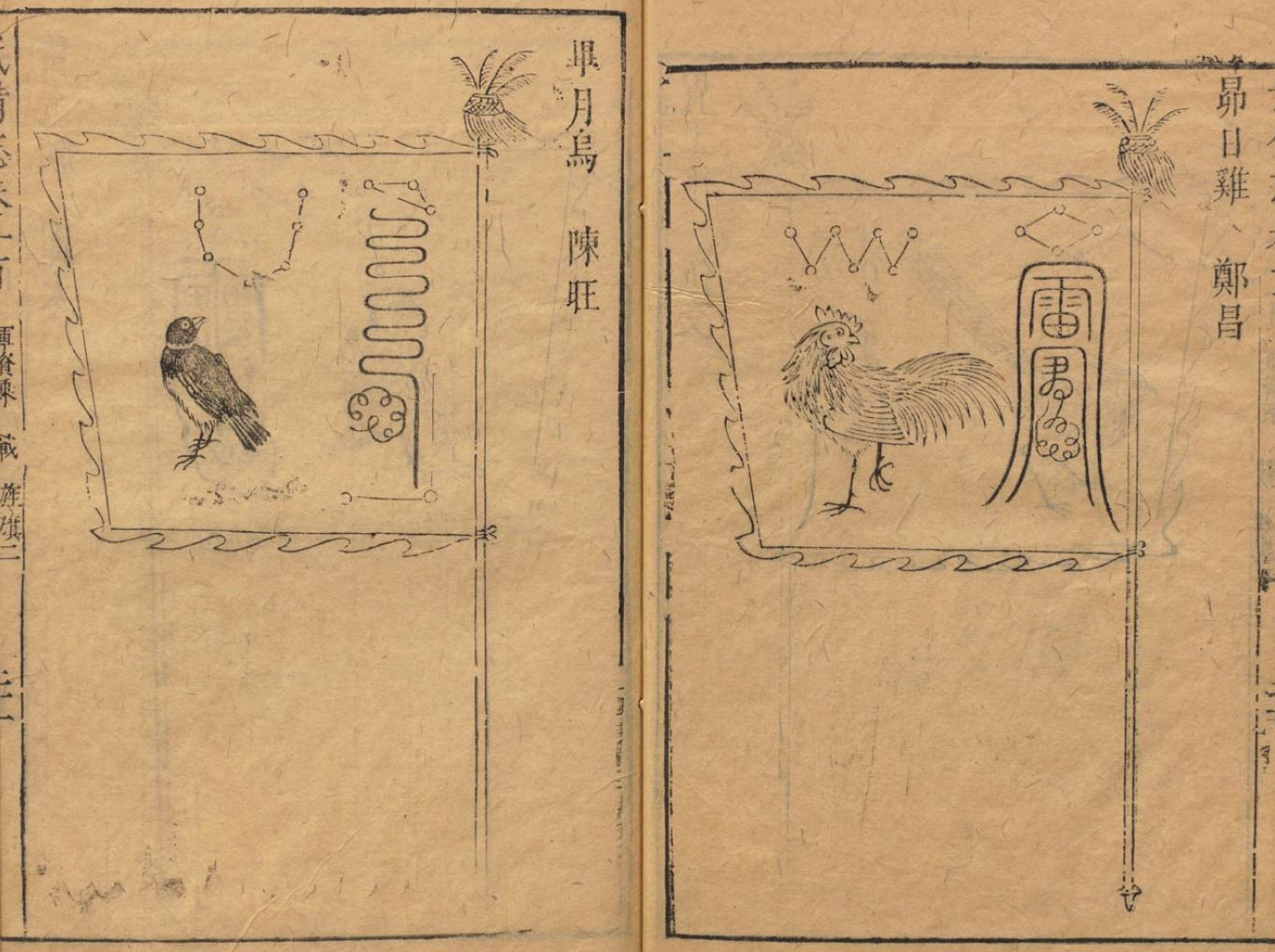
Ming dynasty

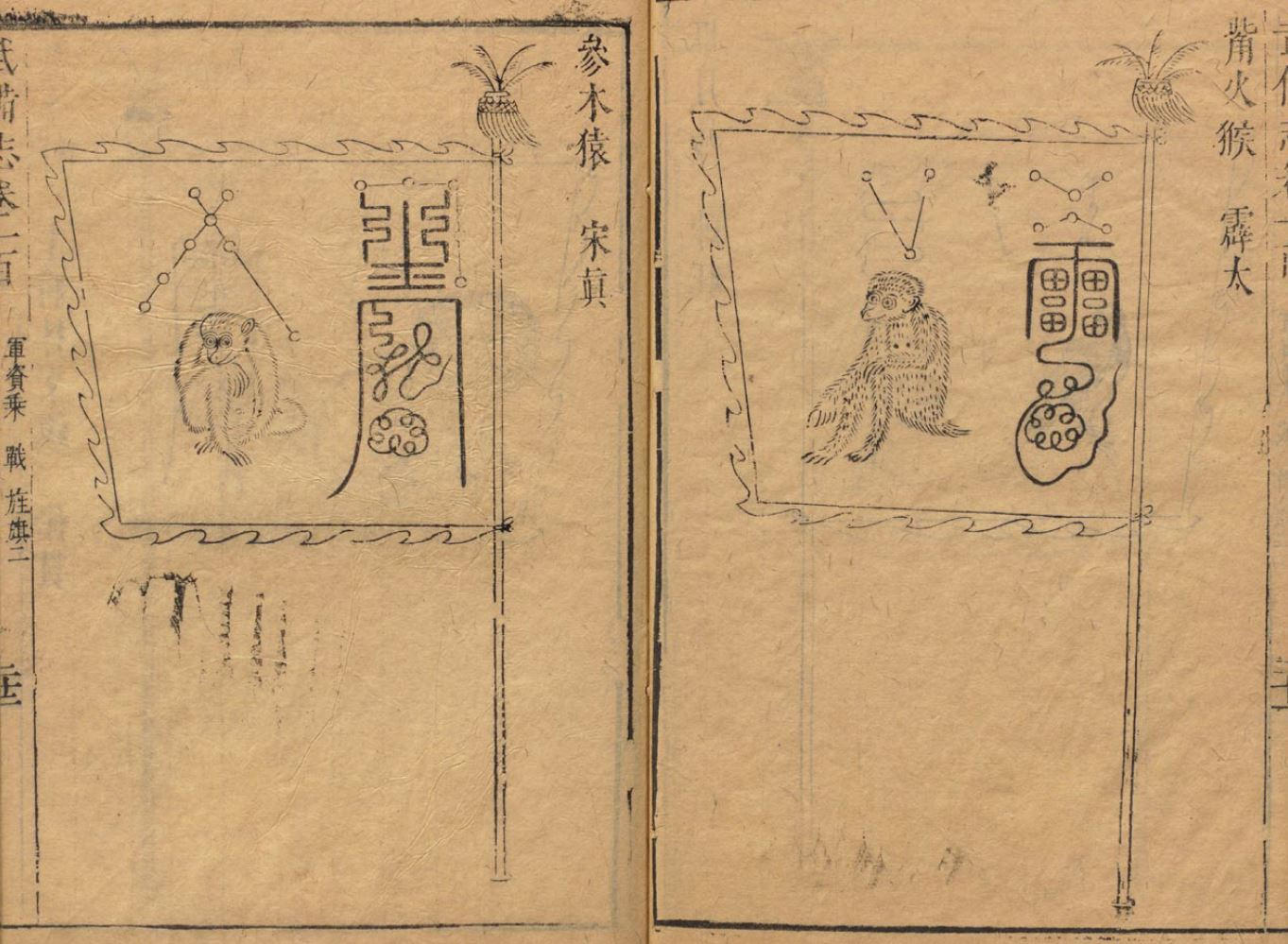
Ming dynasty

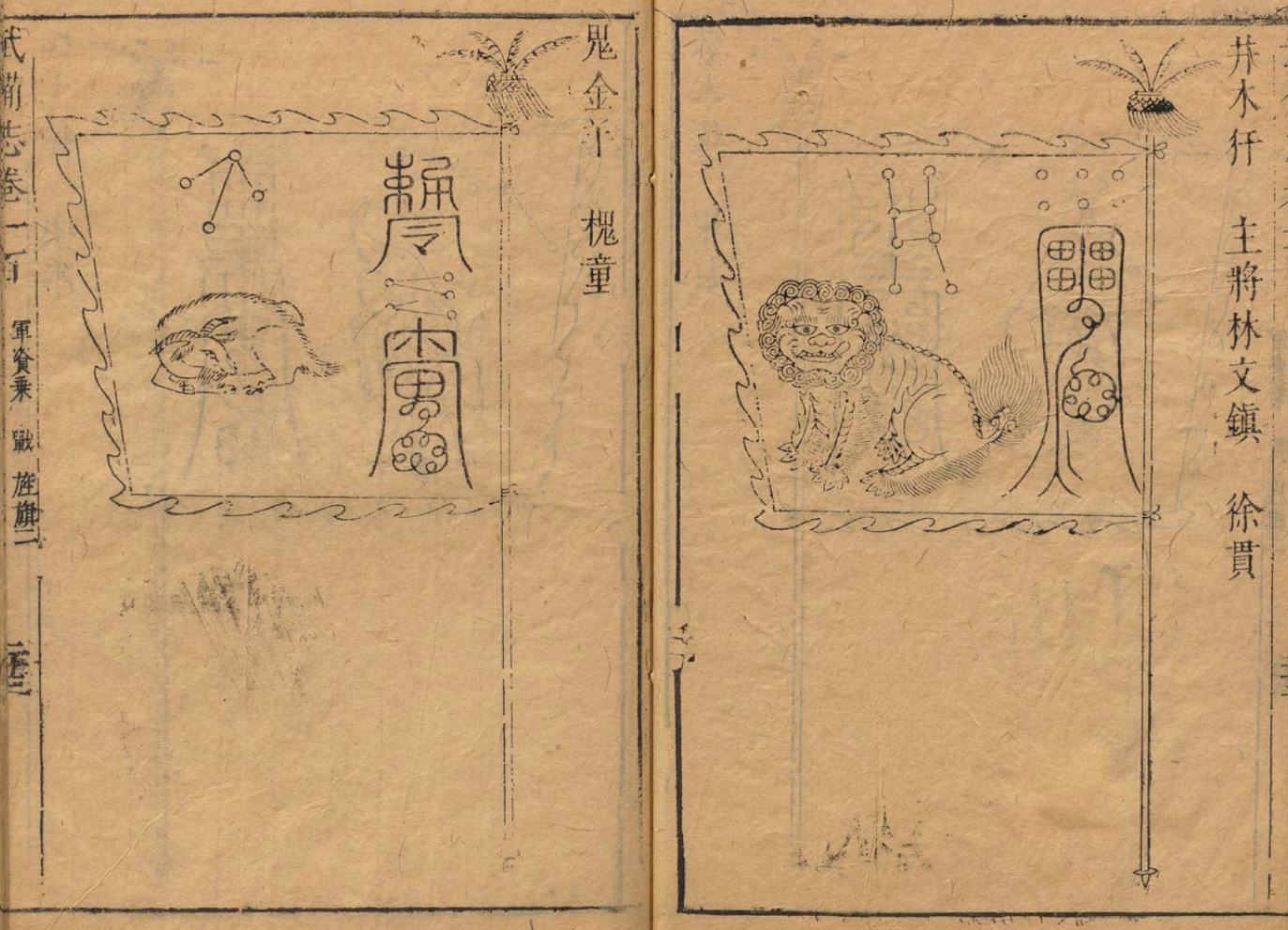
Ming dynasty

Ming dynasty

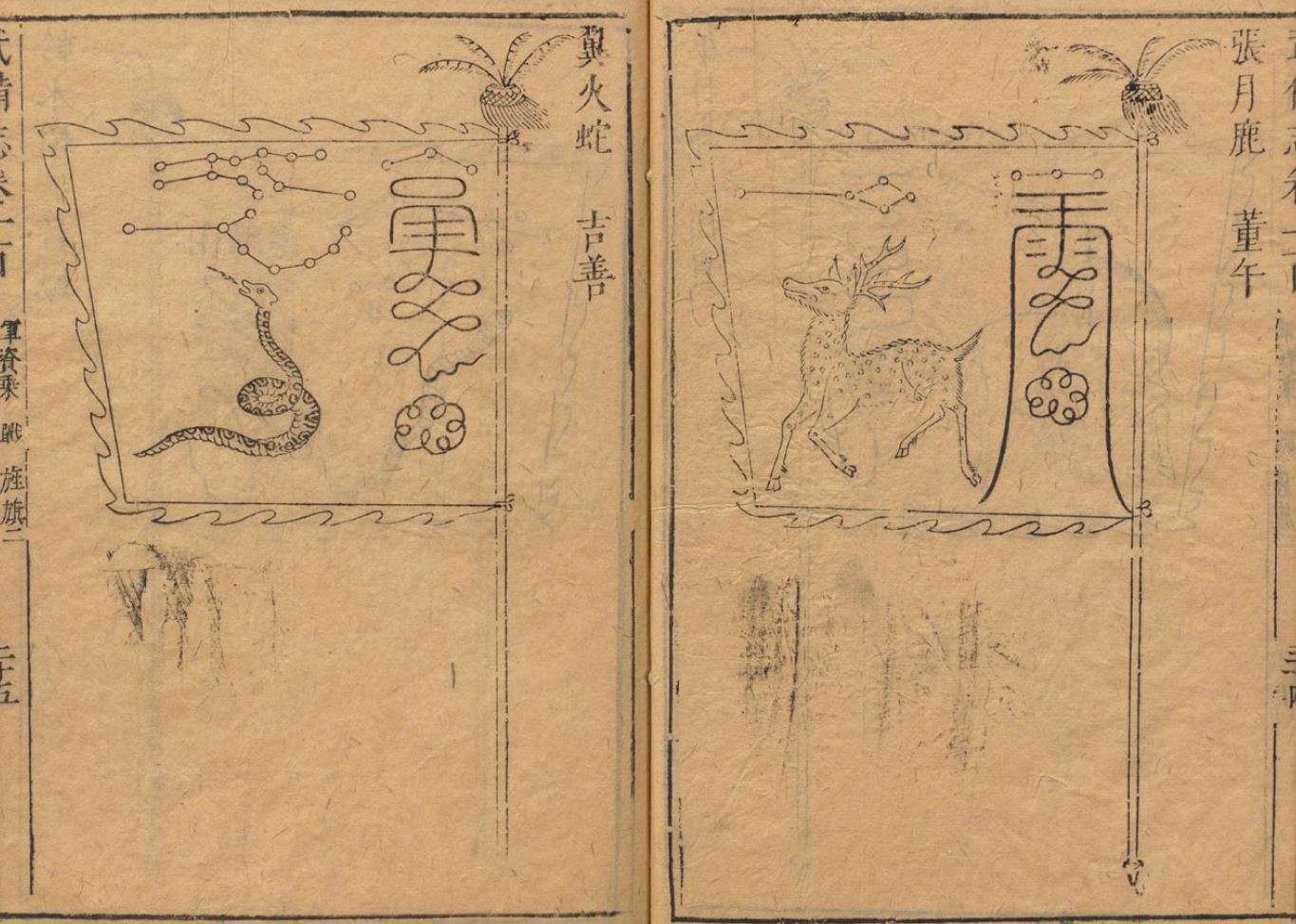
Ming dynasty

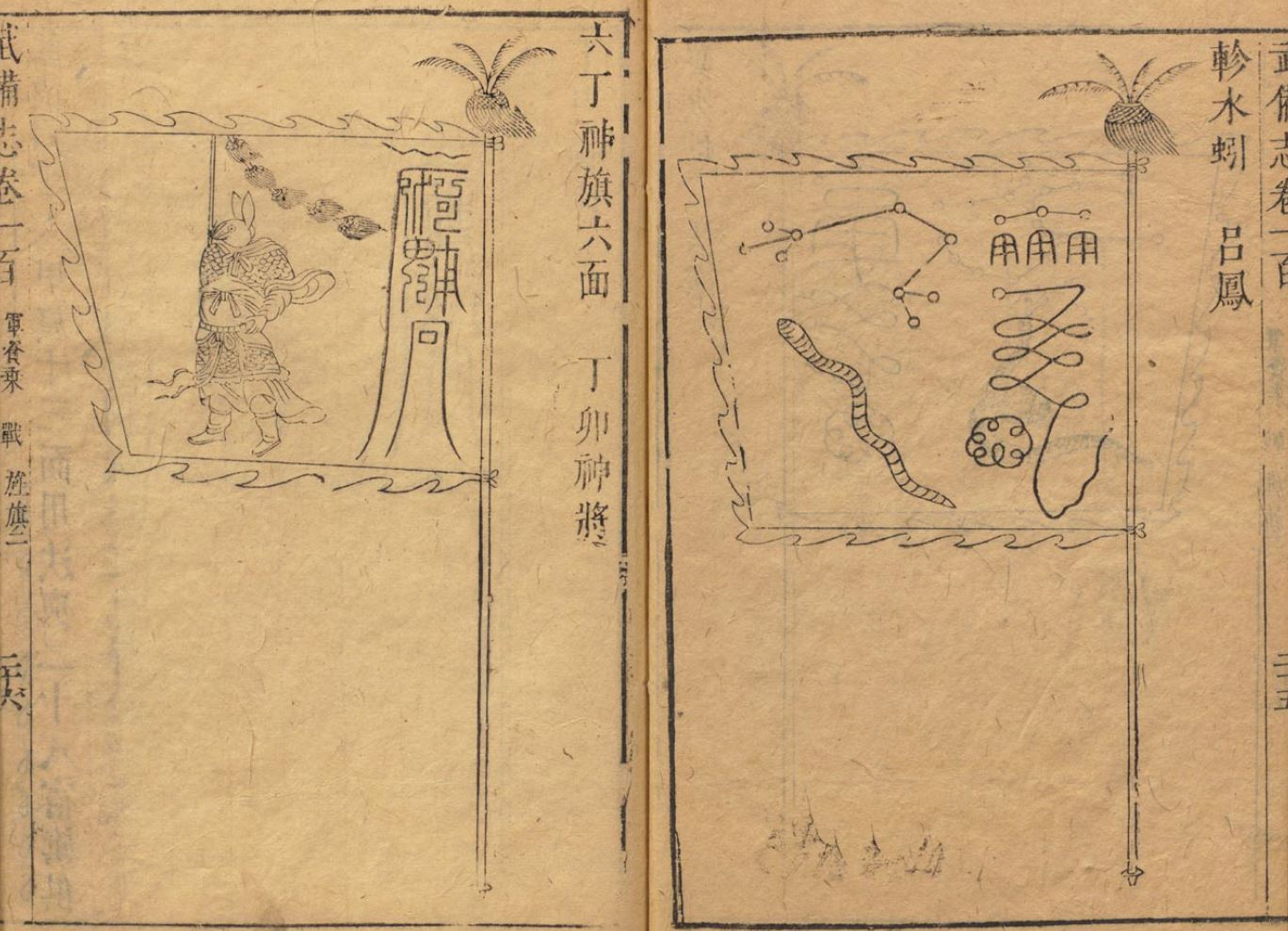
Ming dynasty

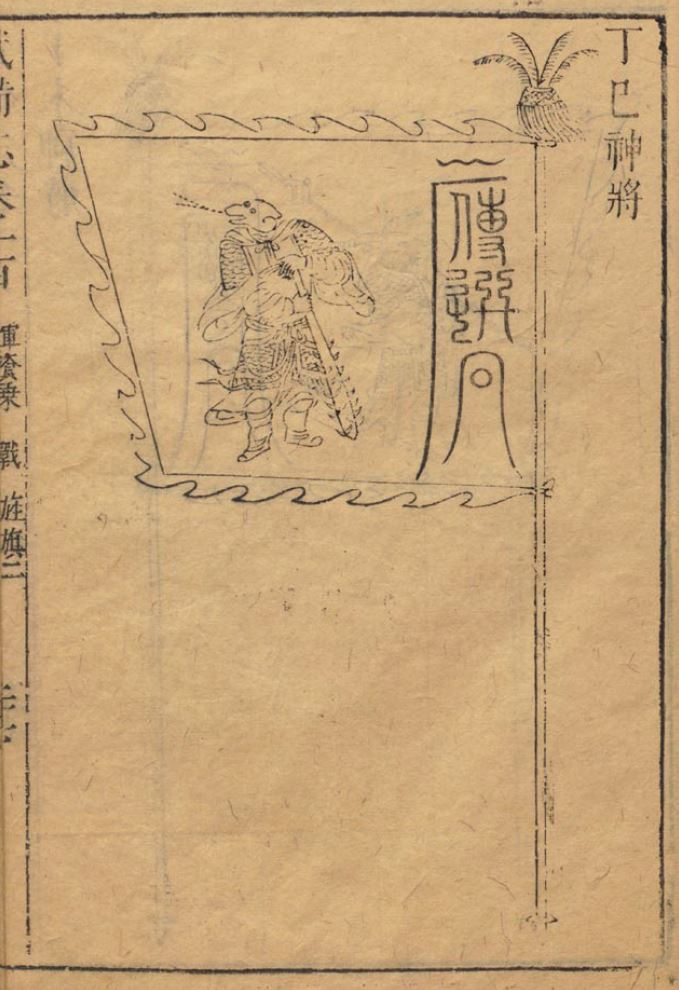
Ming dynasty

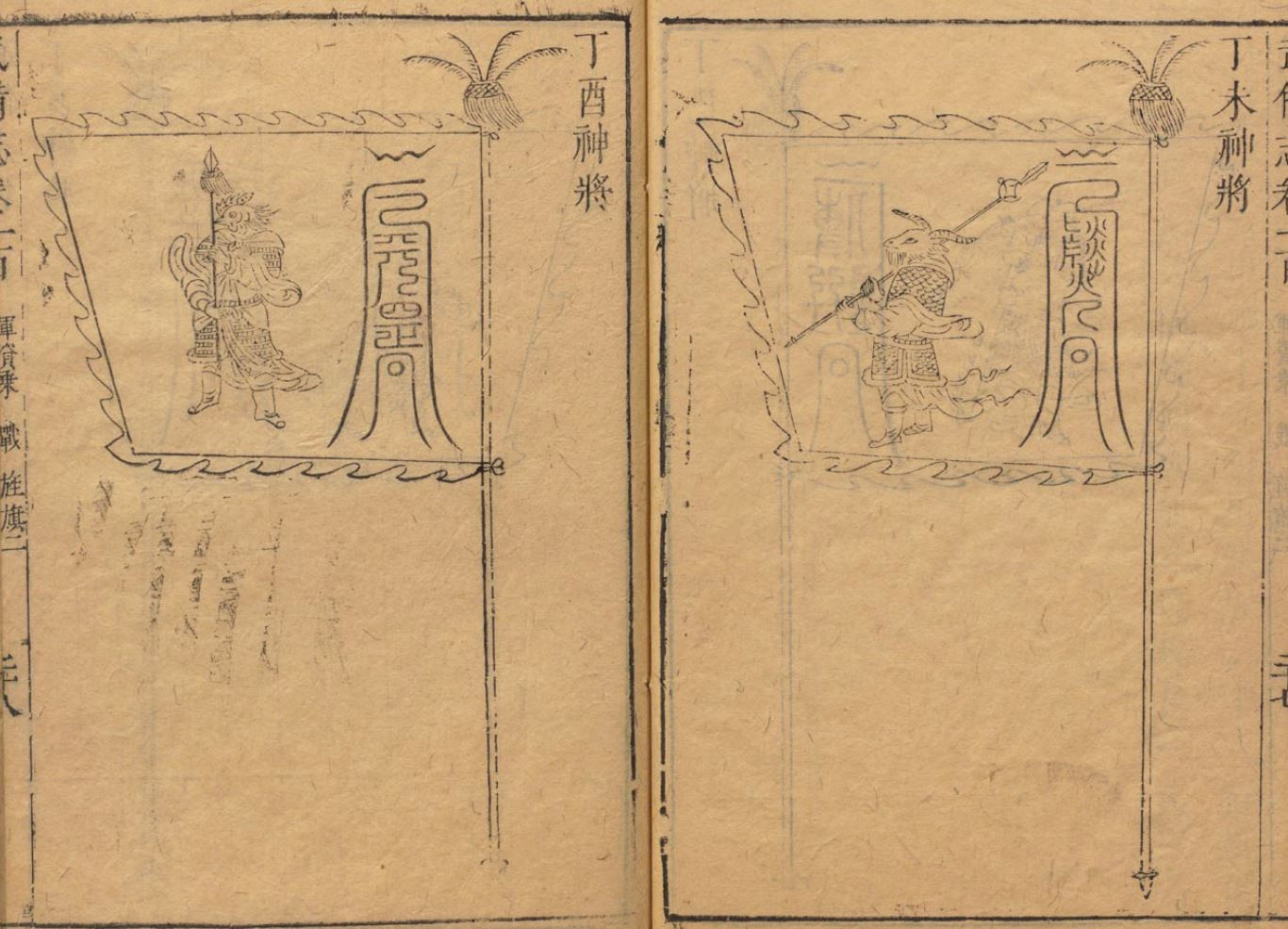
Ming dynasty

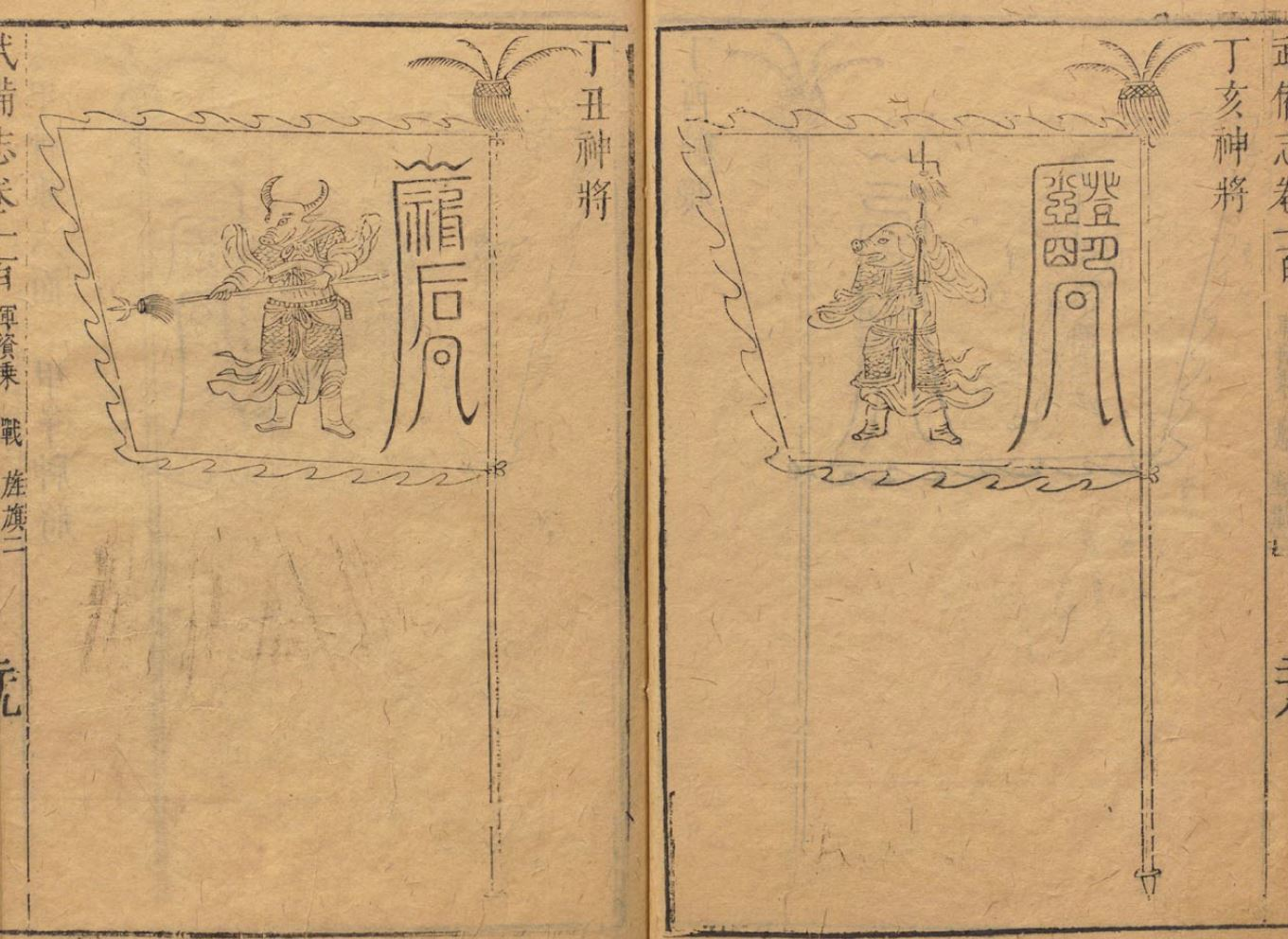
Ming dynasty

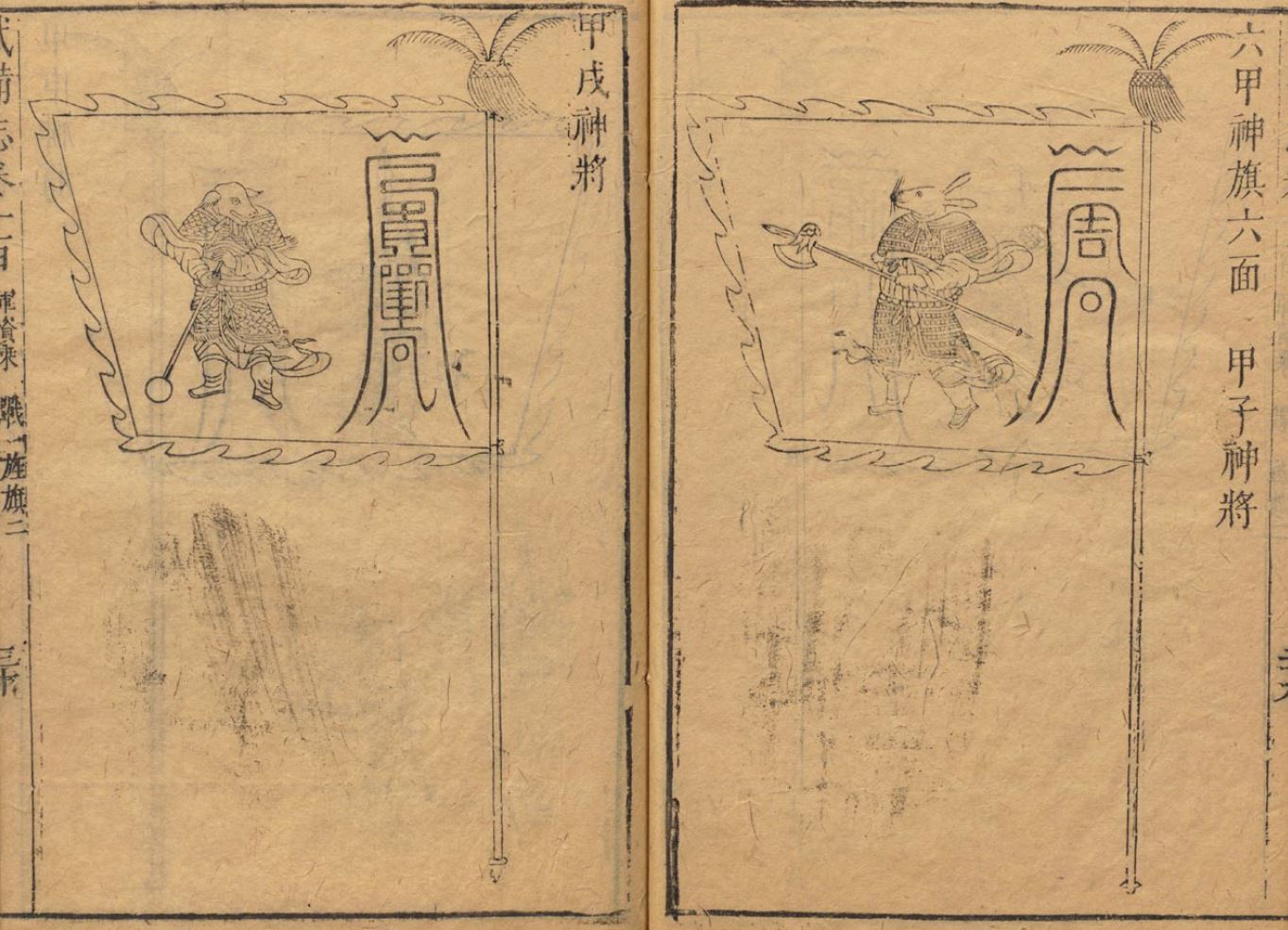
Ming dynasty

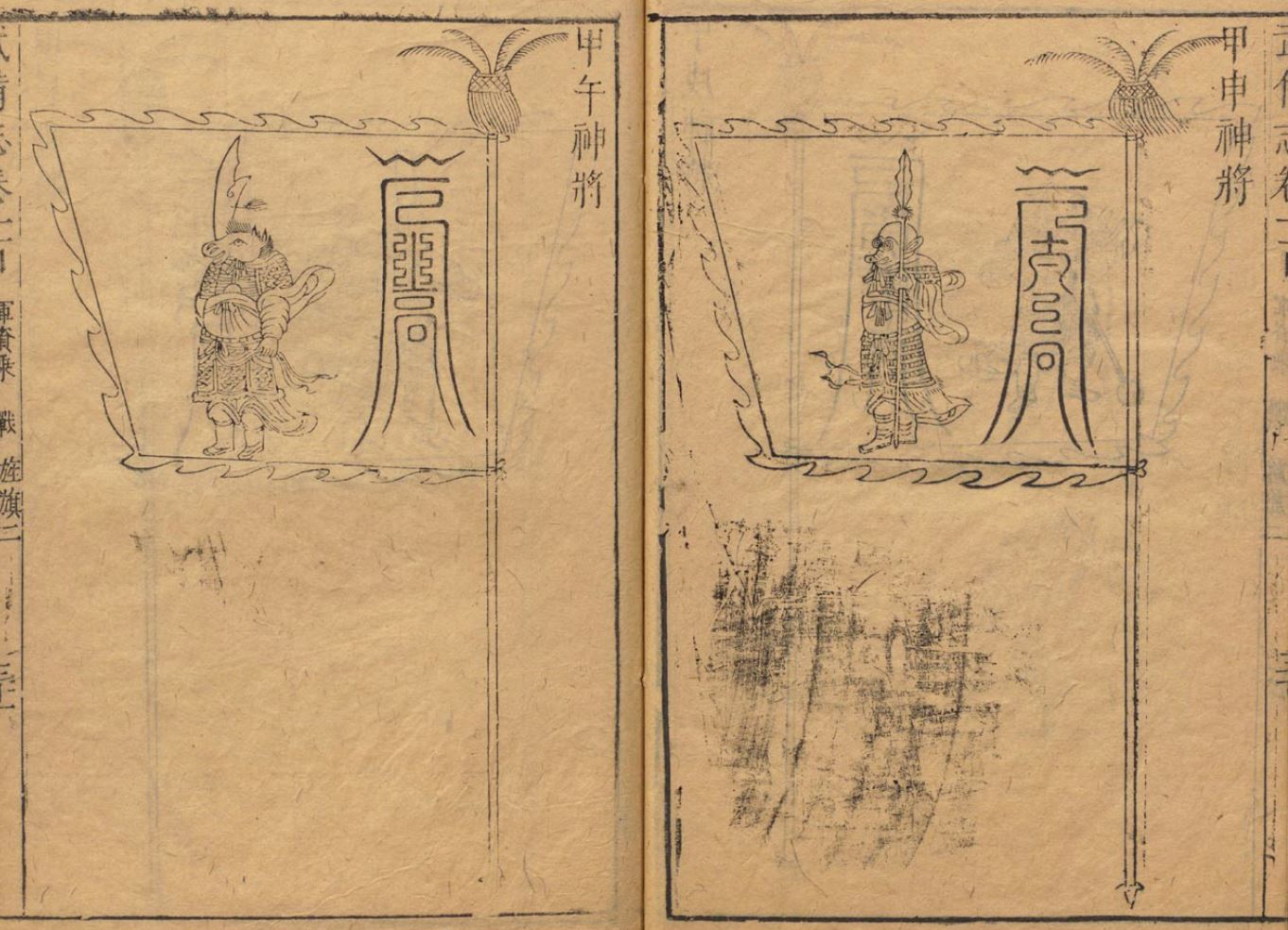
Ming dynasty

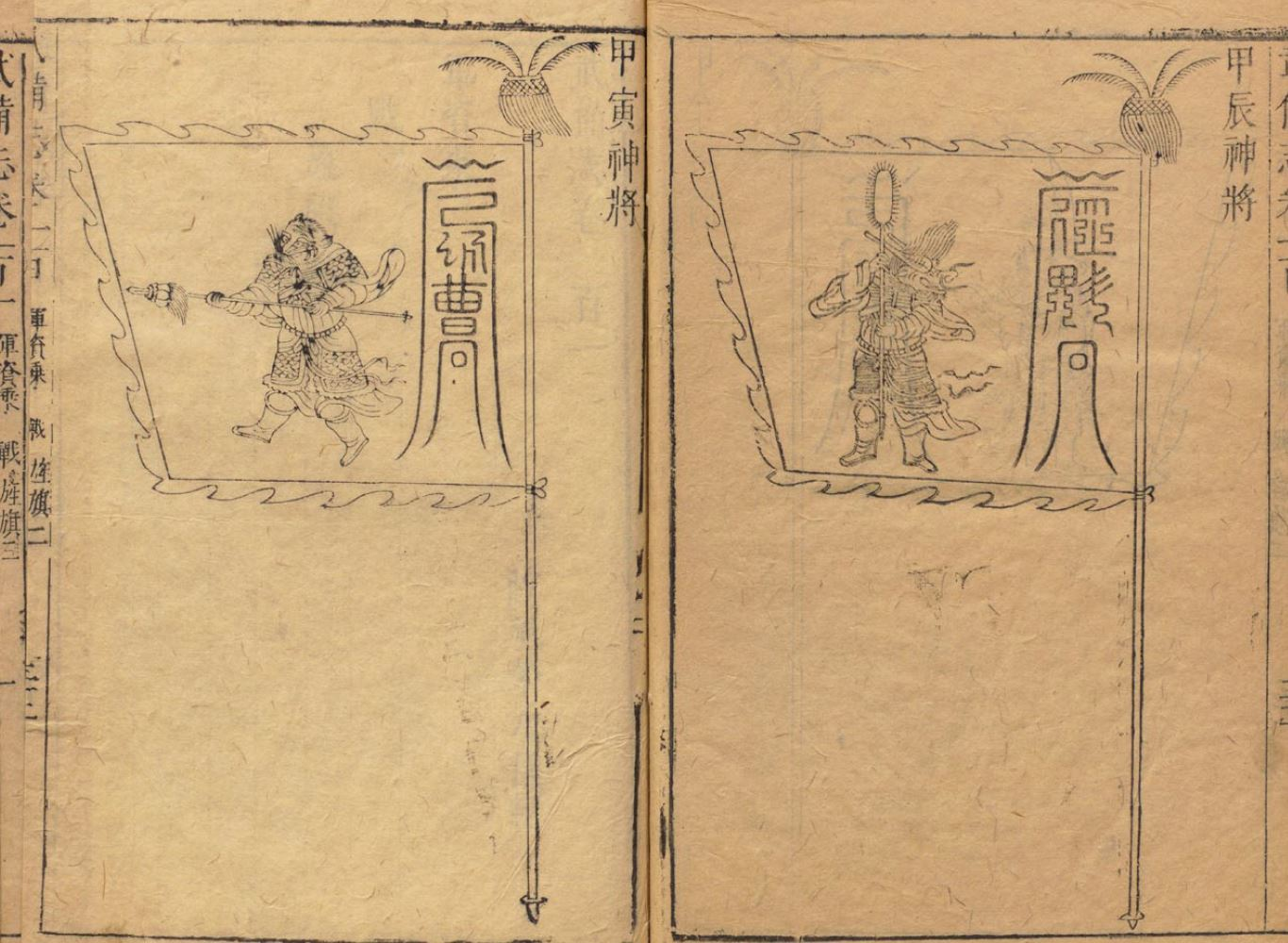
Ming dynasty

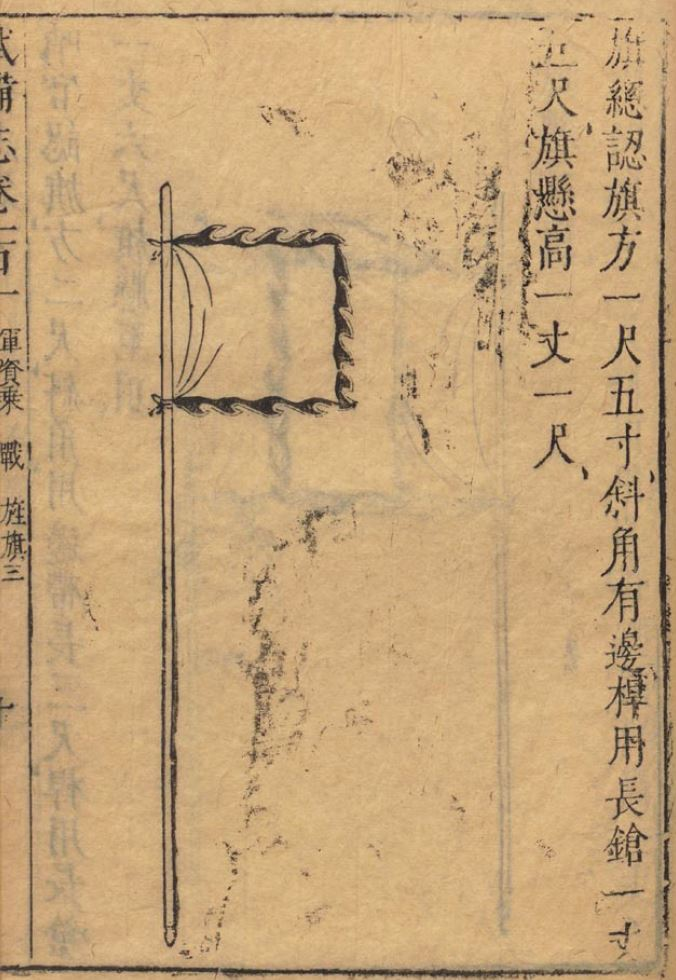
Ming dynasty

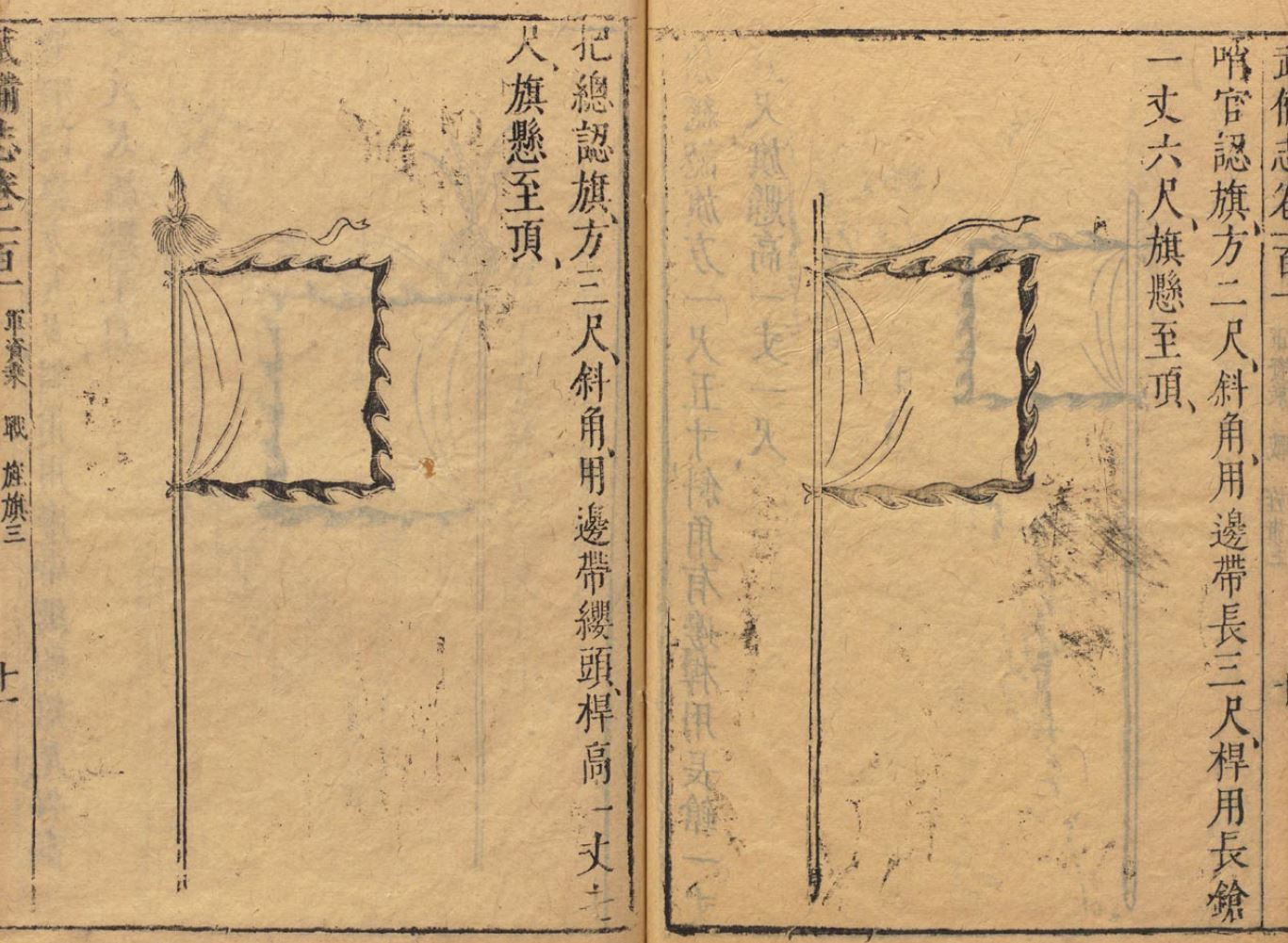
Ming dynasty

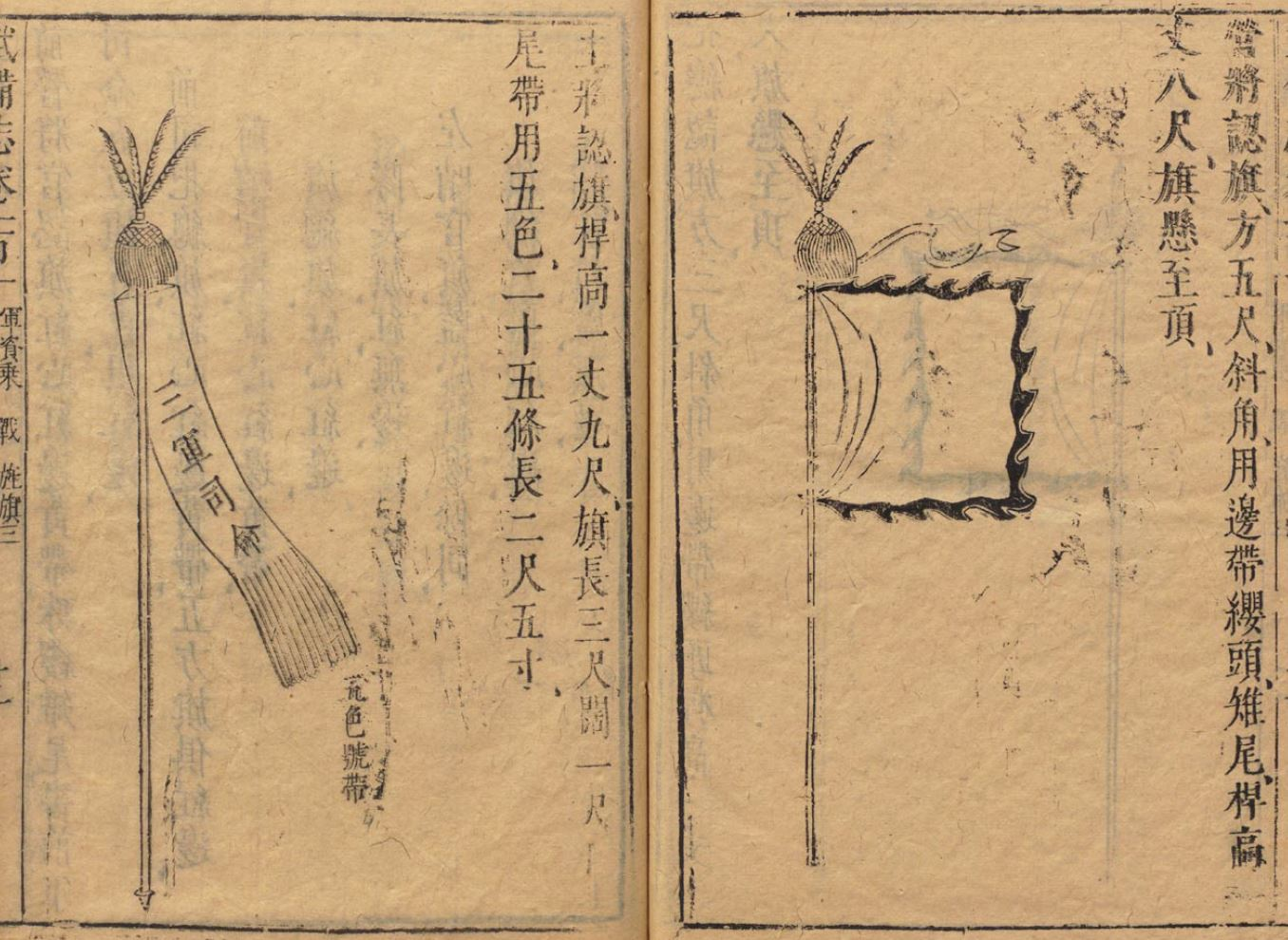
Ming dynasty

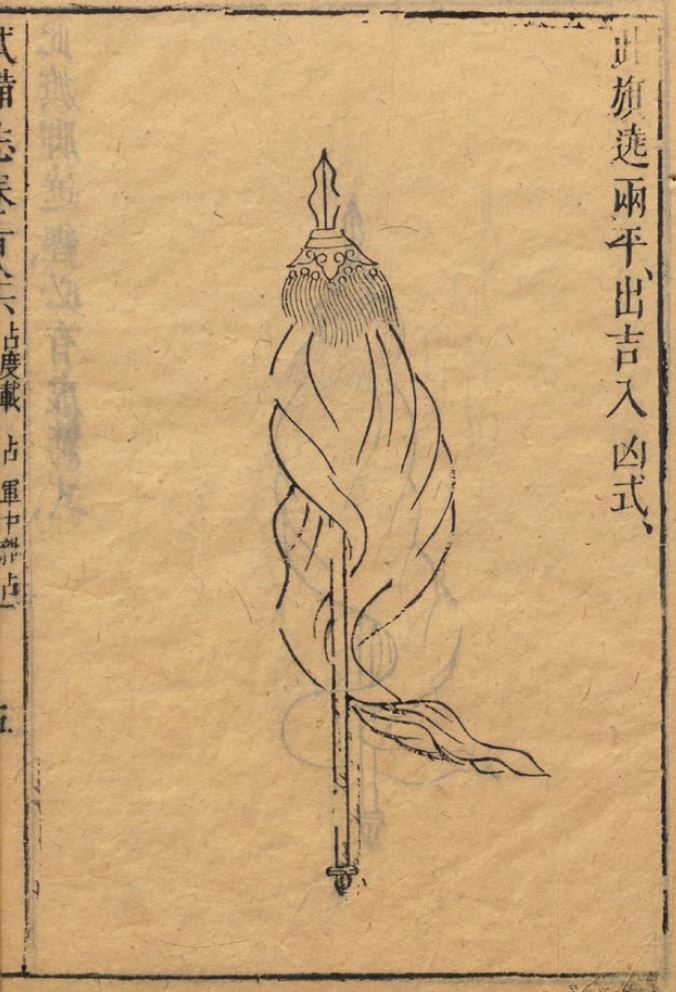
Ming dynasty

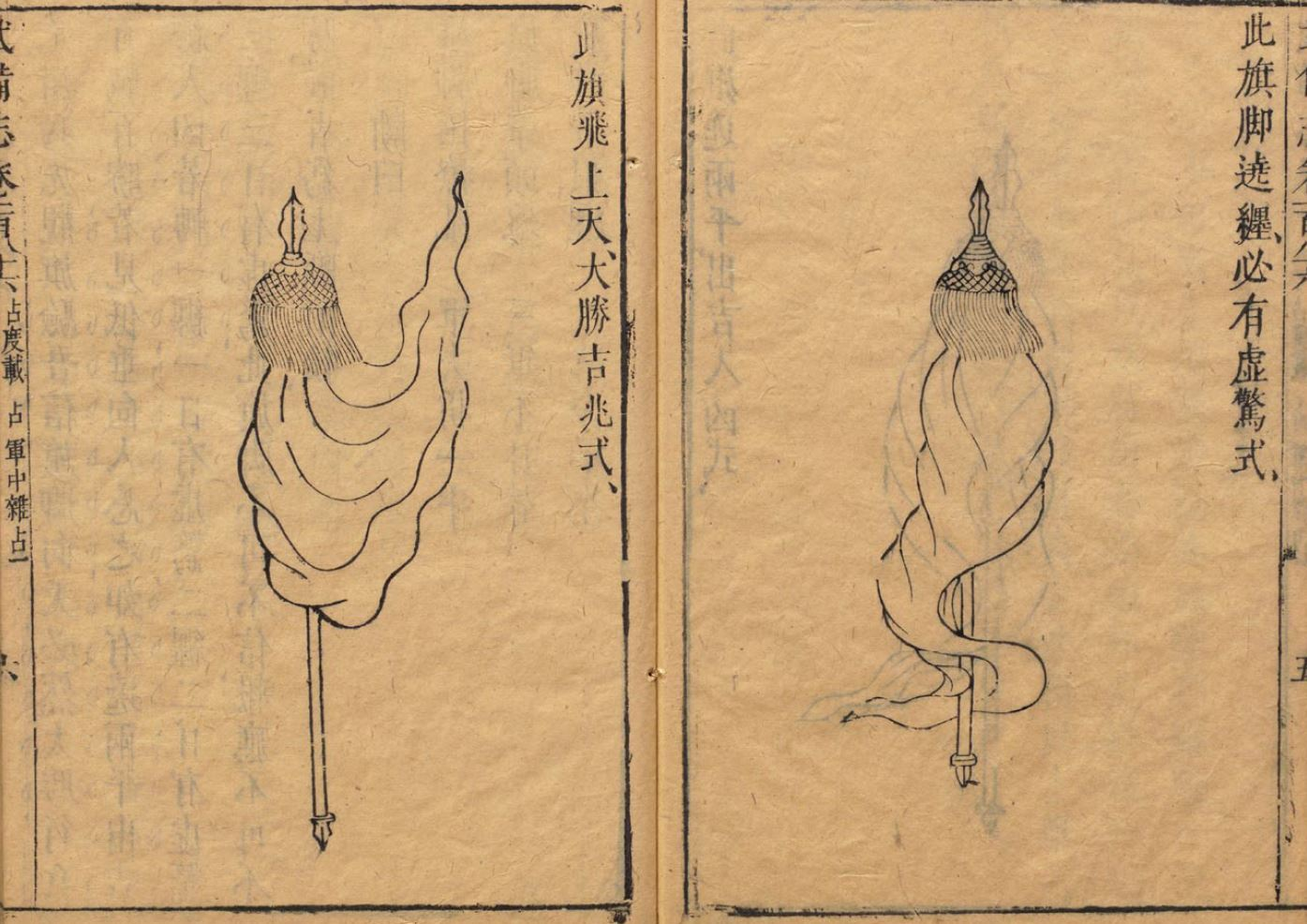
Ming dynasty

==== Banners present in old paintings ====
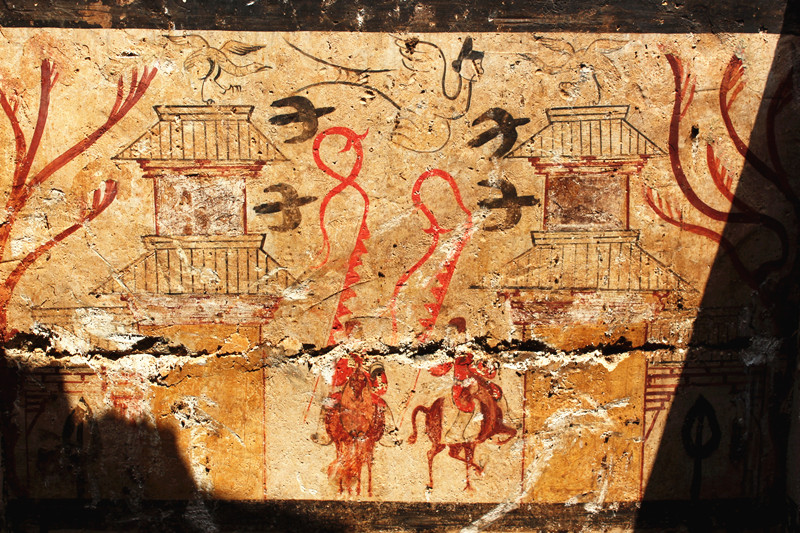
Han dynasty

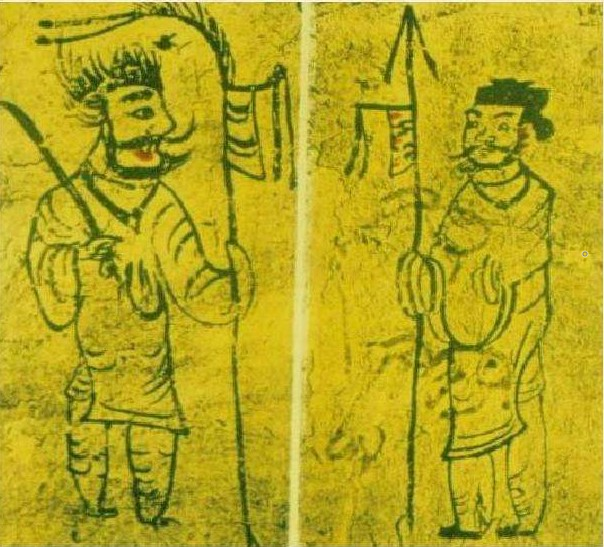
Han dynasty

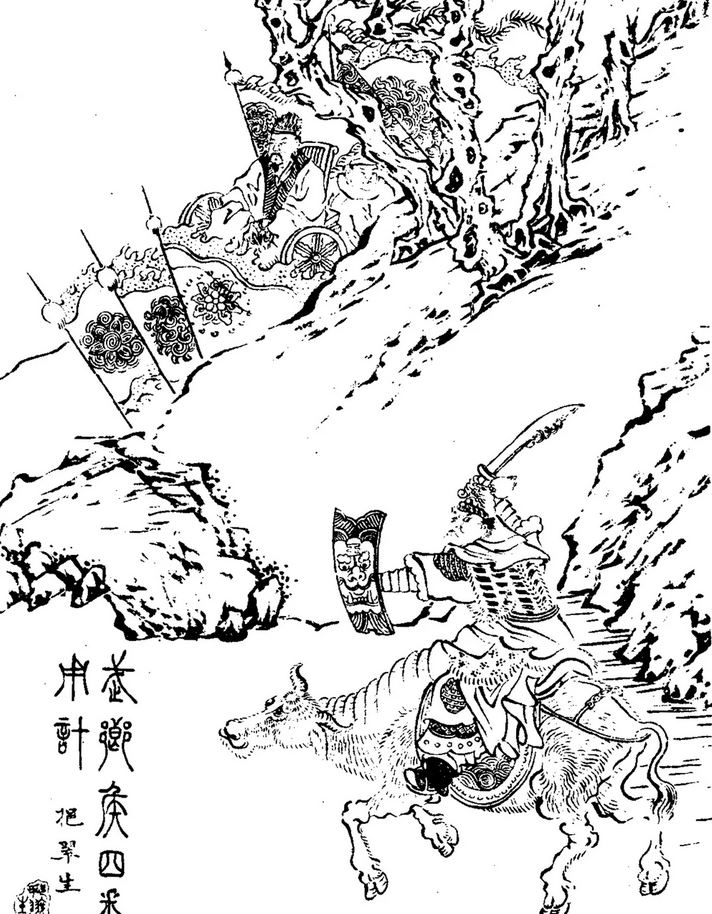
Shu Han

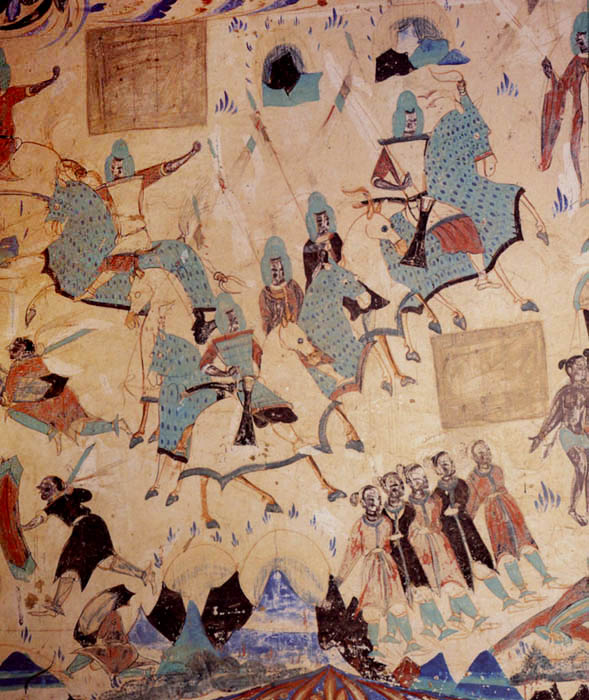
Western Wei

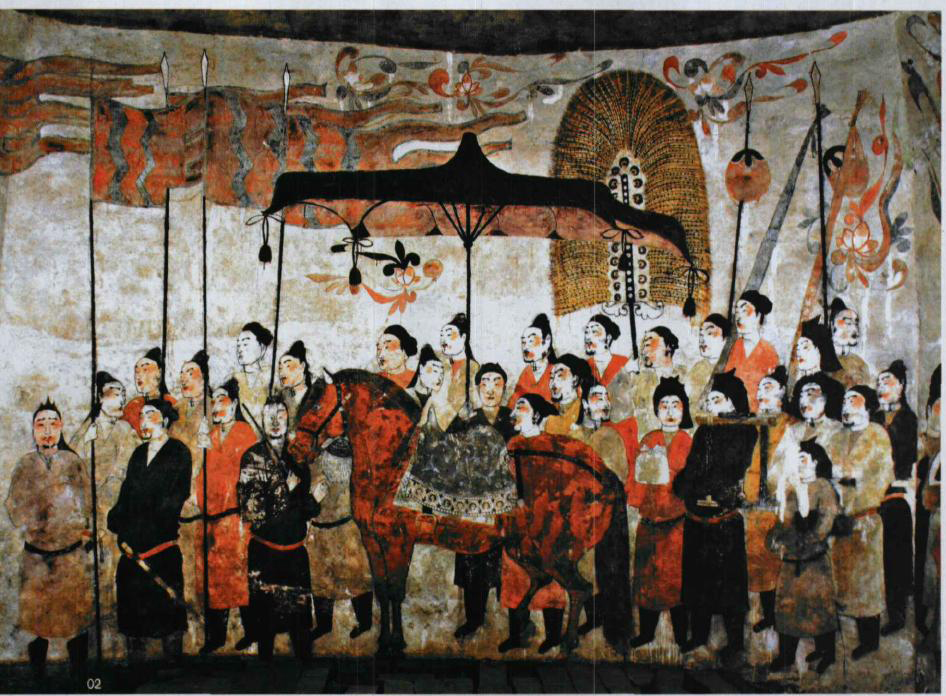
Northern Qi

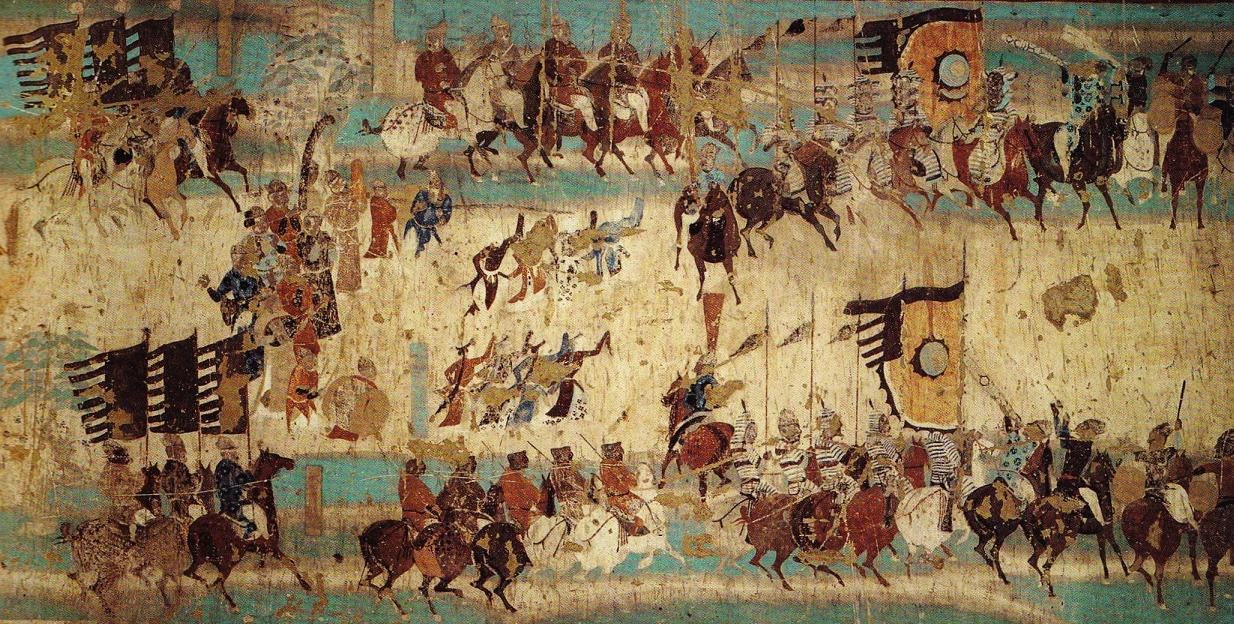
Tang dynasty

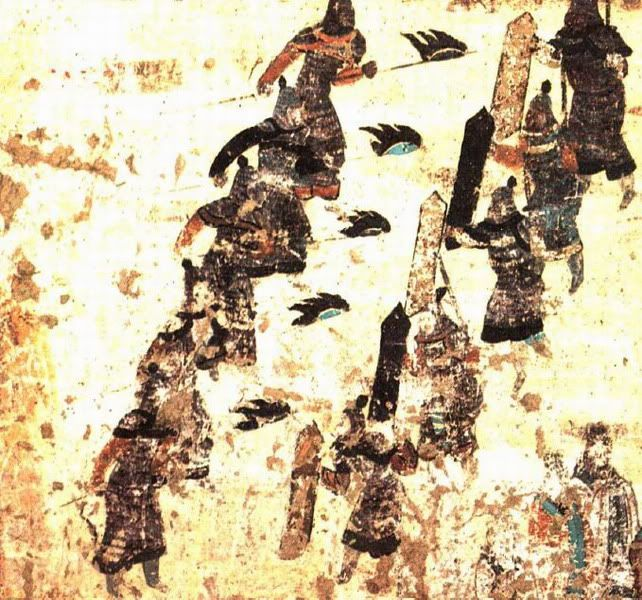
Tang dynasty

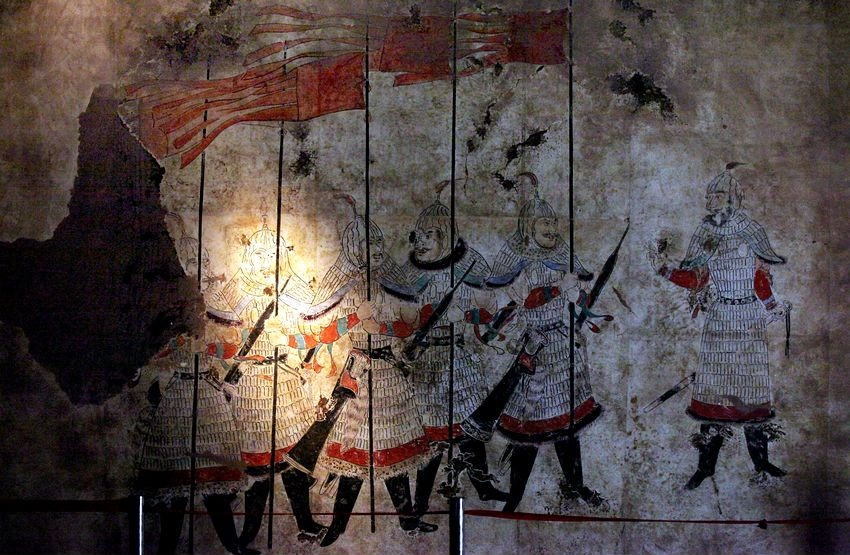
Tang dynasty

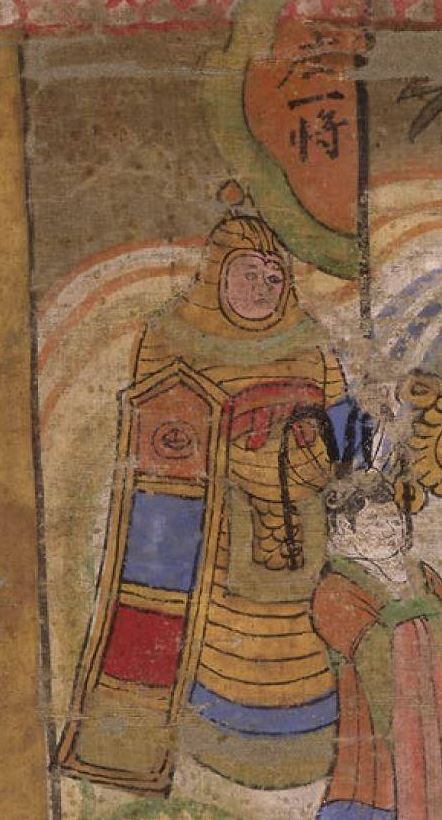
Tang dynasty

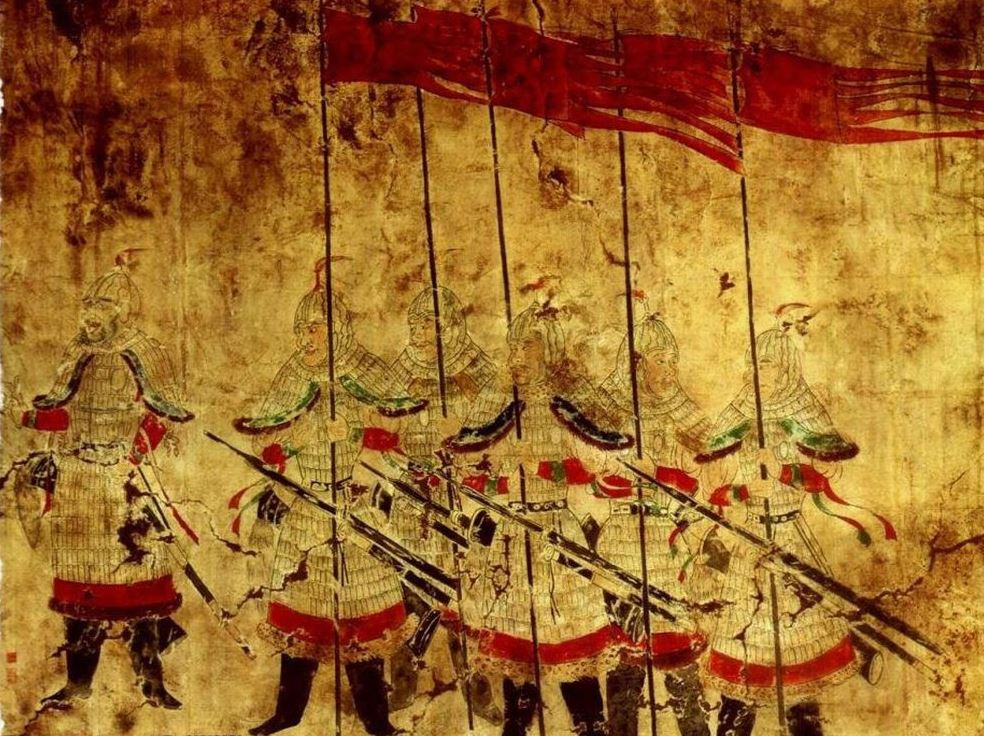
Tang dynasty

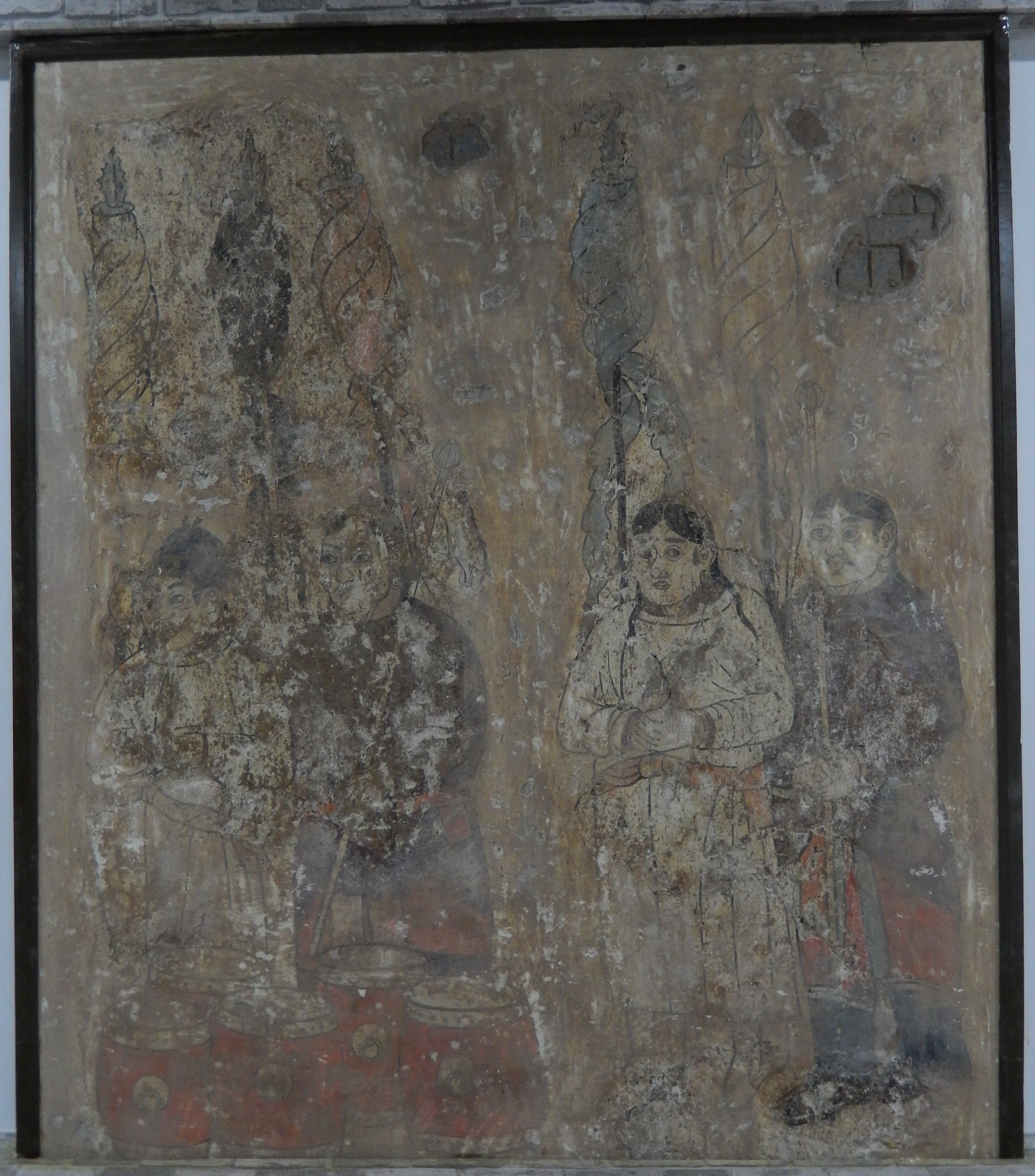
Liao dynasty

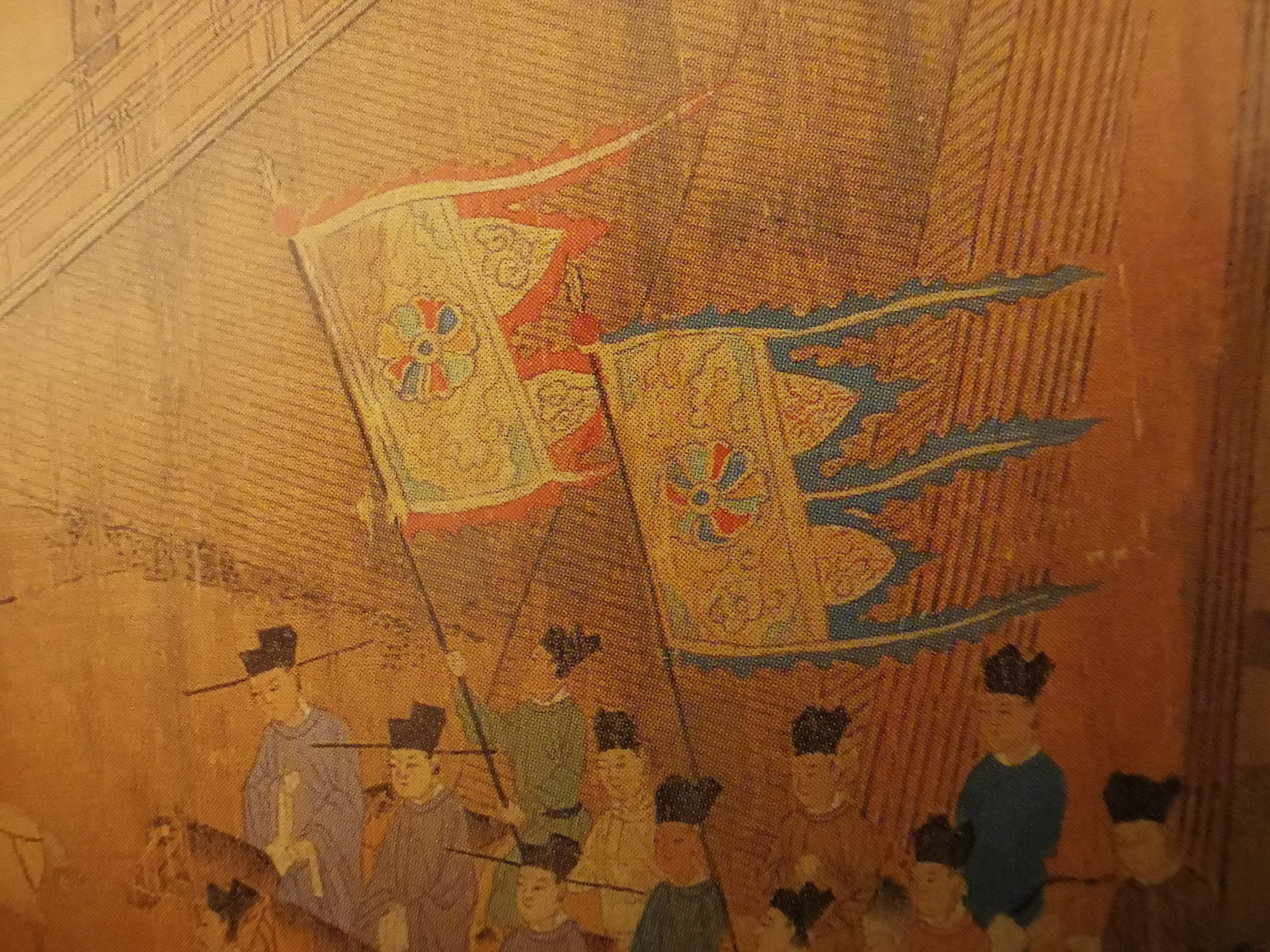
Song dynasty

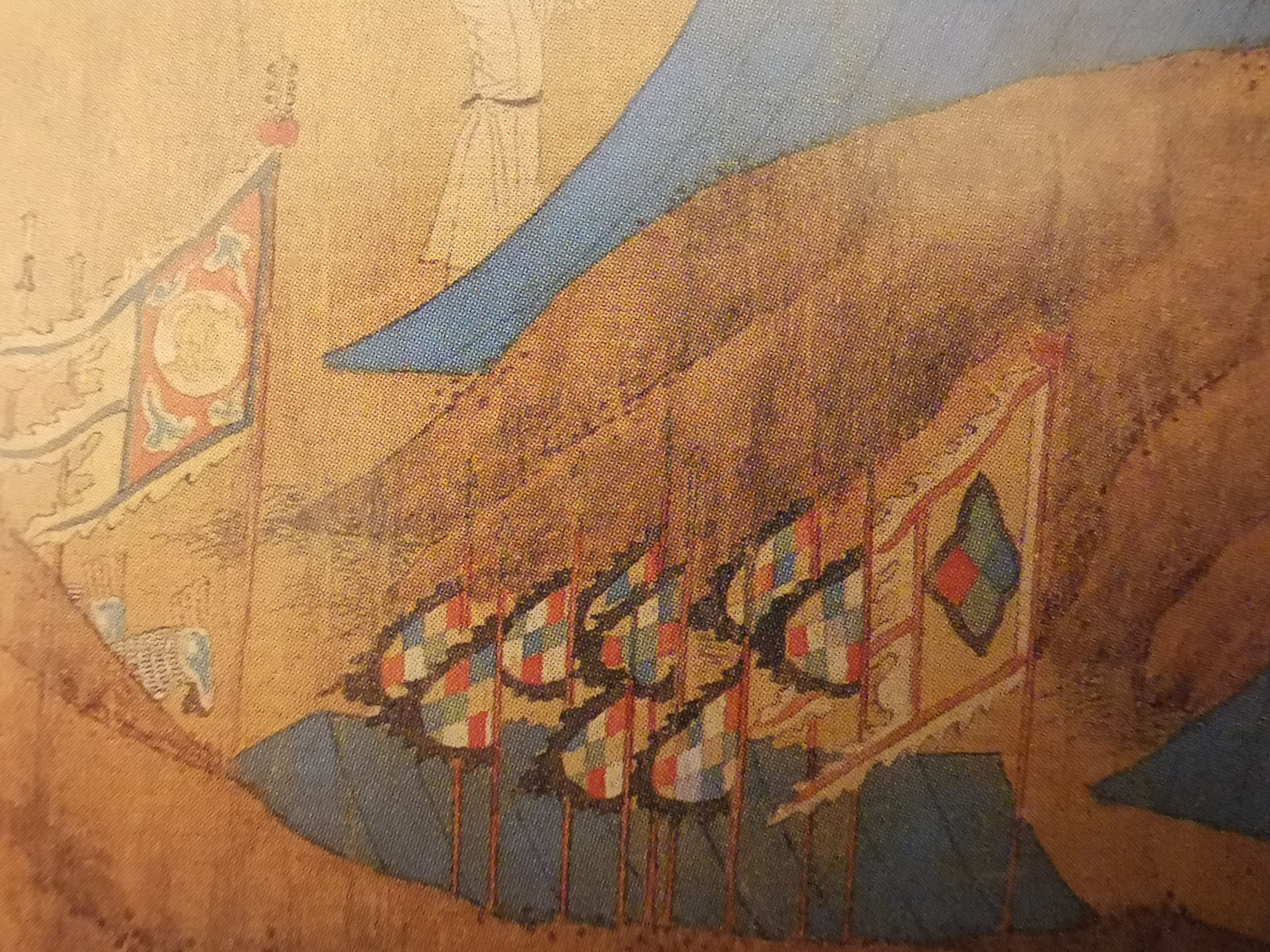
Song dynasty

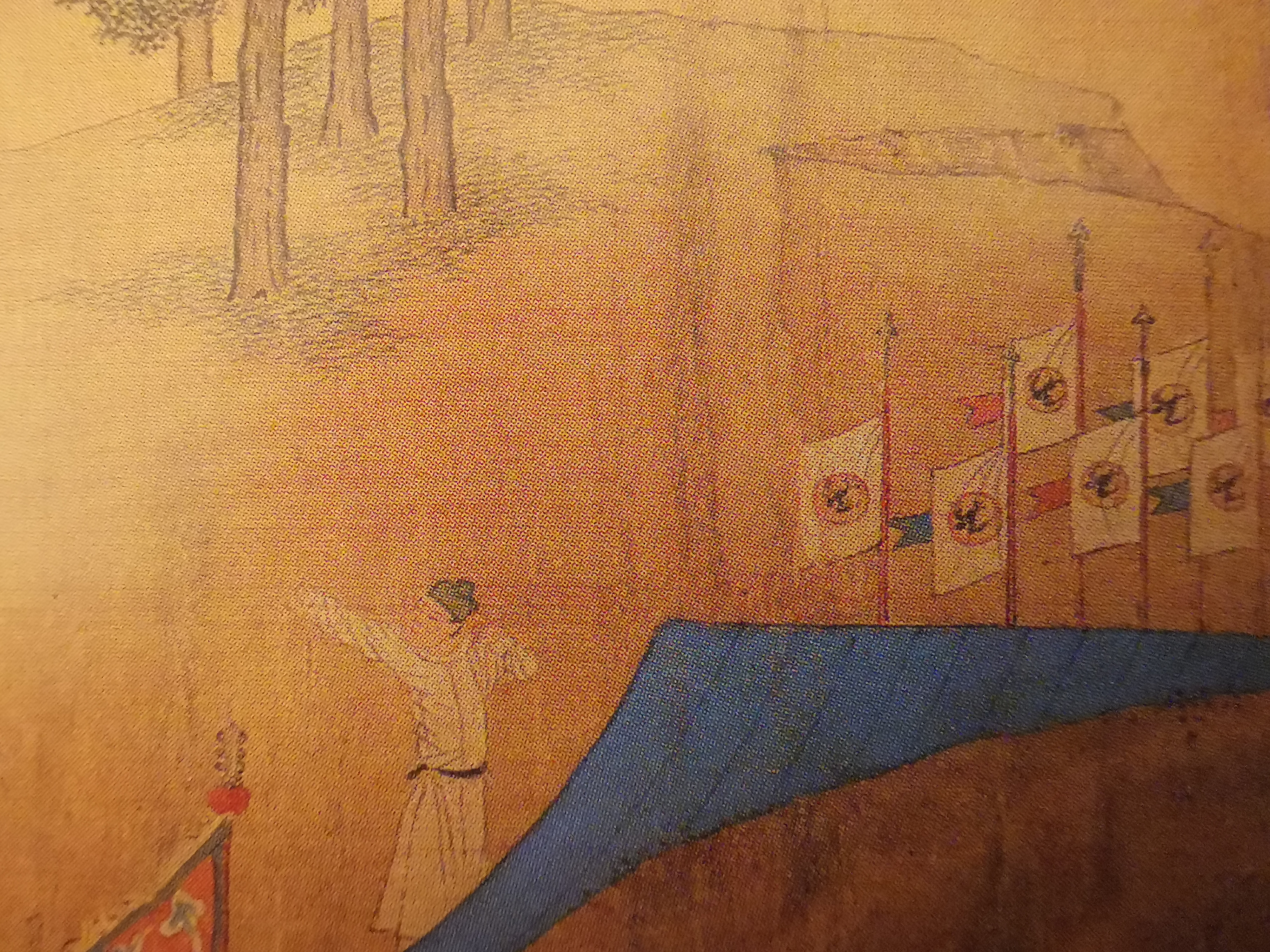
Song dynasty

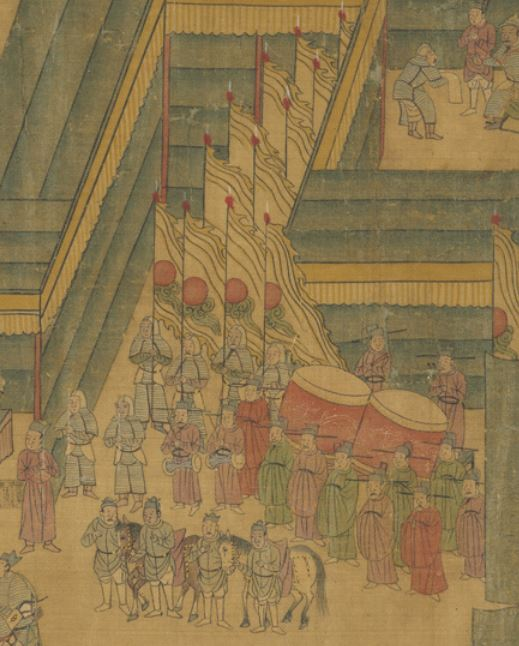
Song dynasty

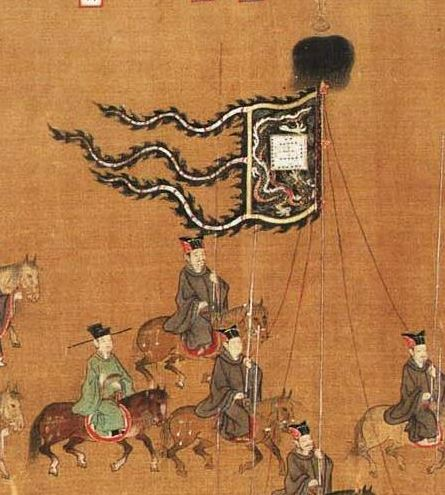
Song dynasty

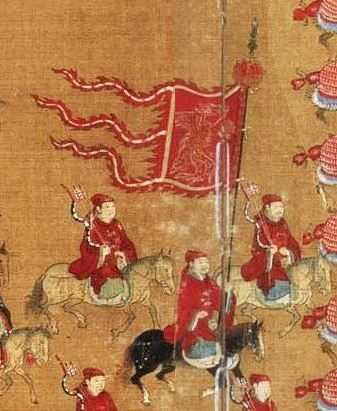
Song dynasty

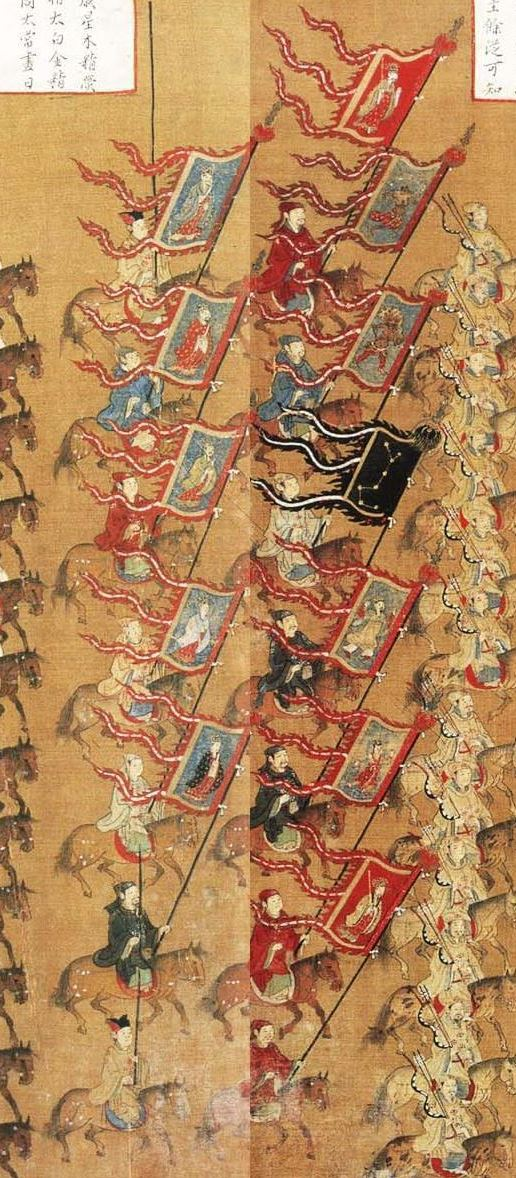
Song dynasty

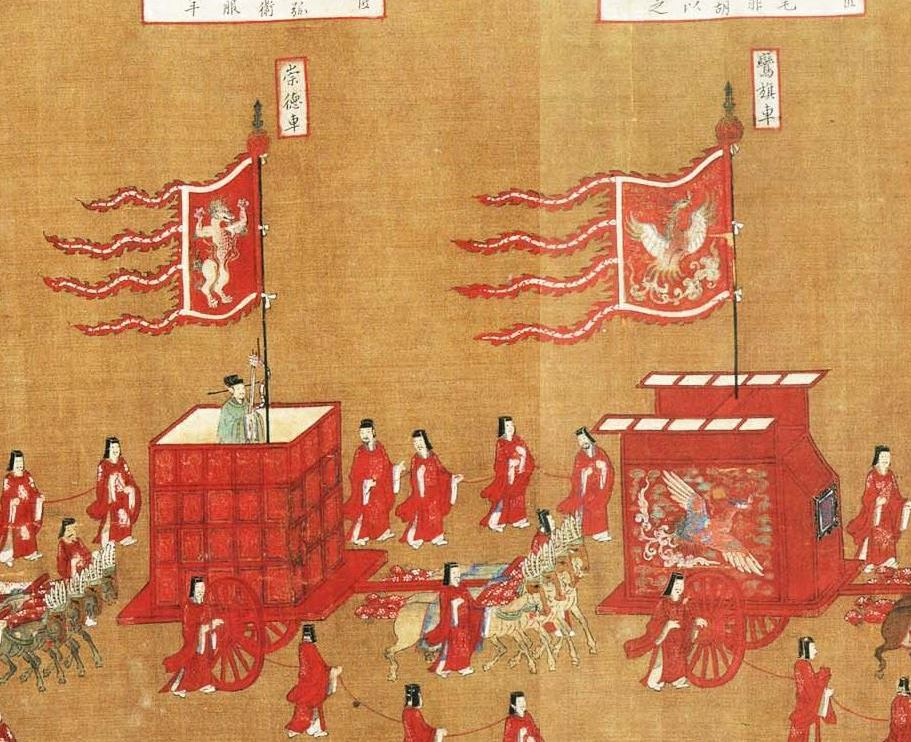
Song dynasty

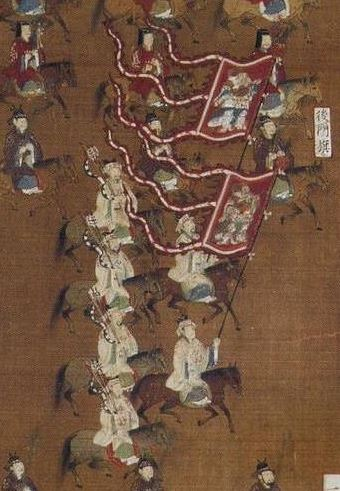
Song dynasty

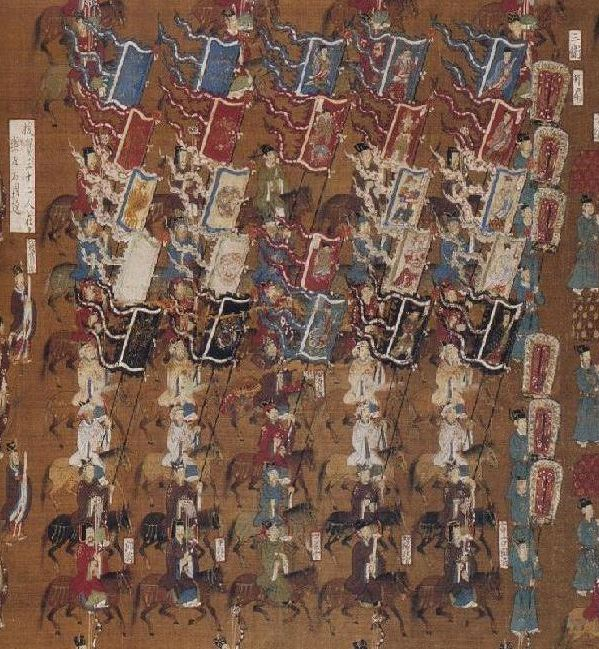
Song dynasty

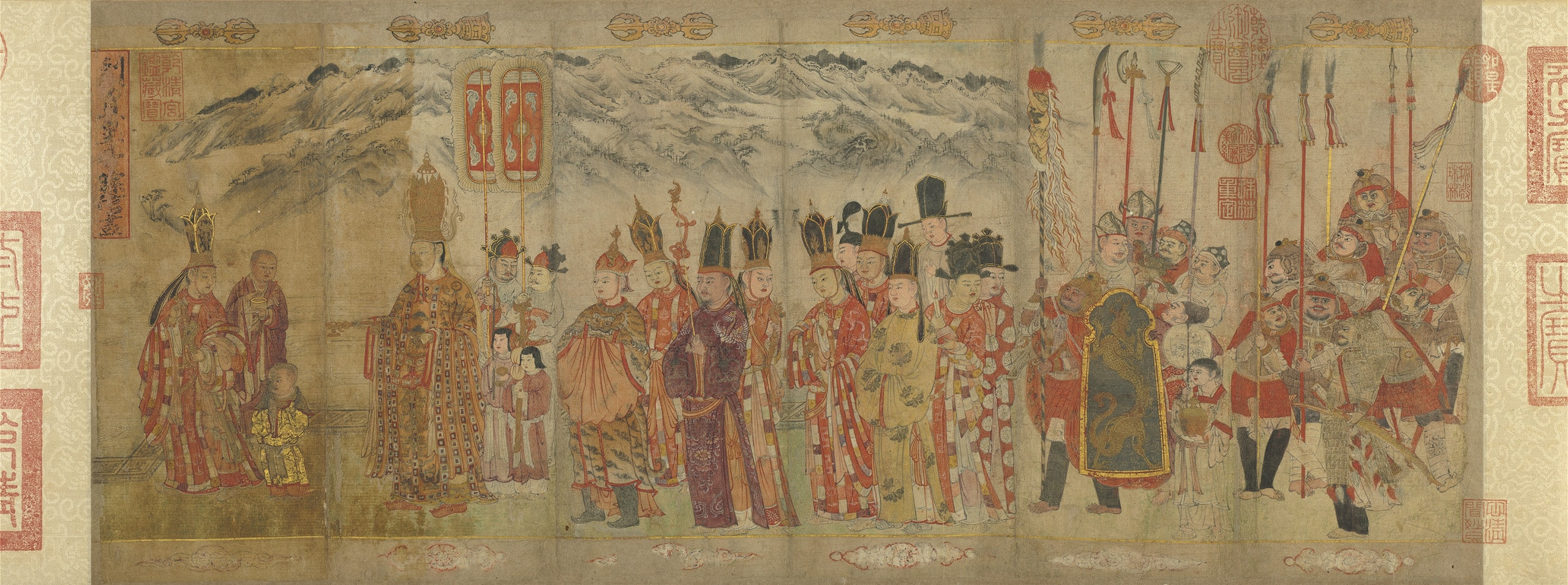
Dali Kingdom

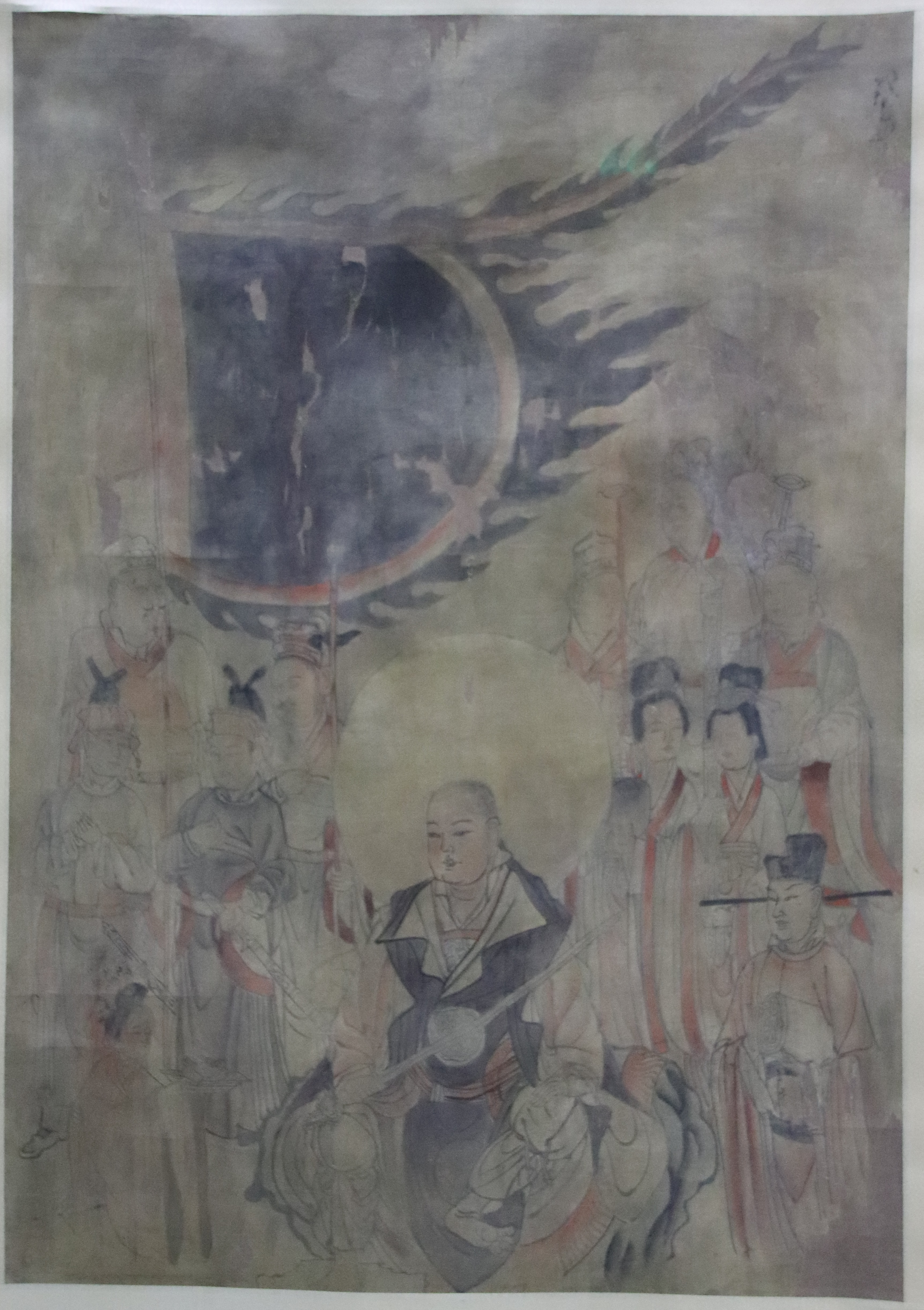
Western Xia

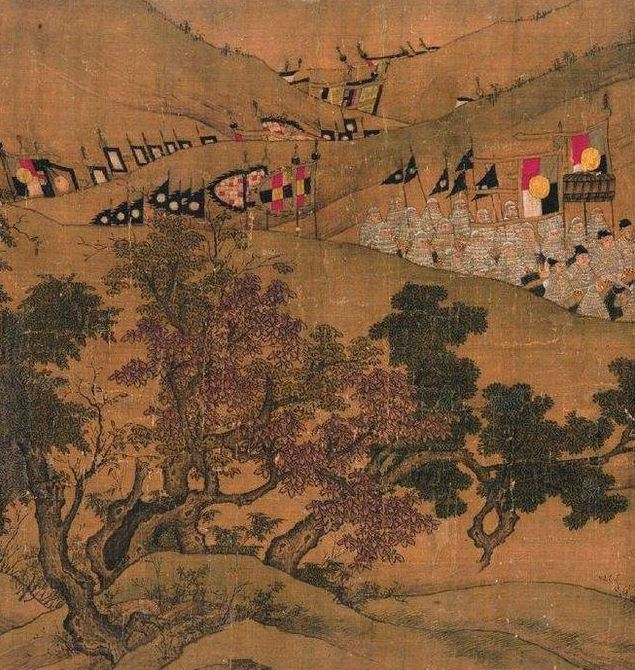
Jin dynasty (1115–1234)

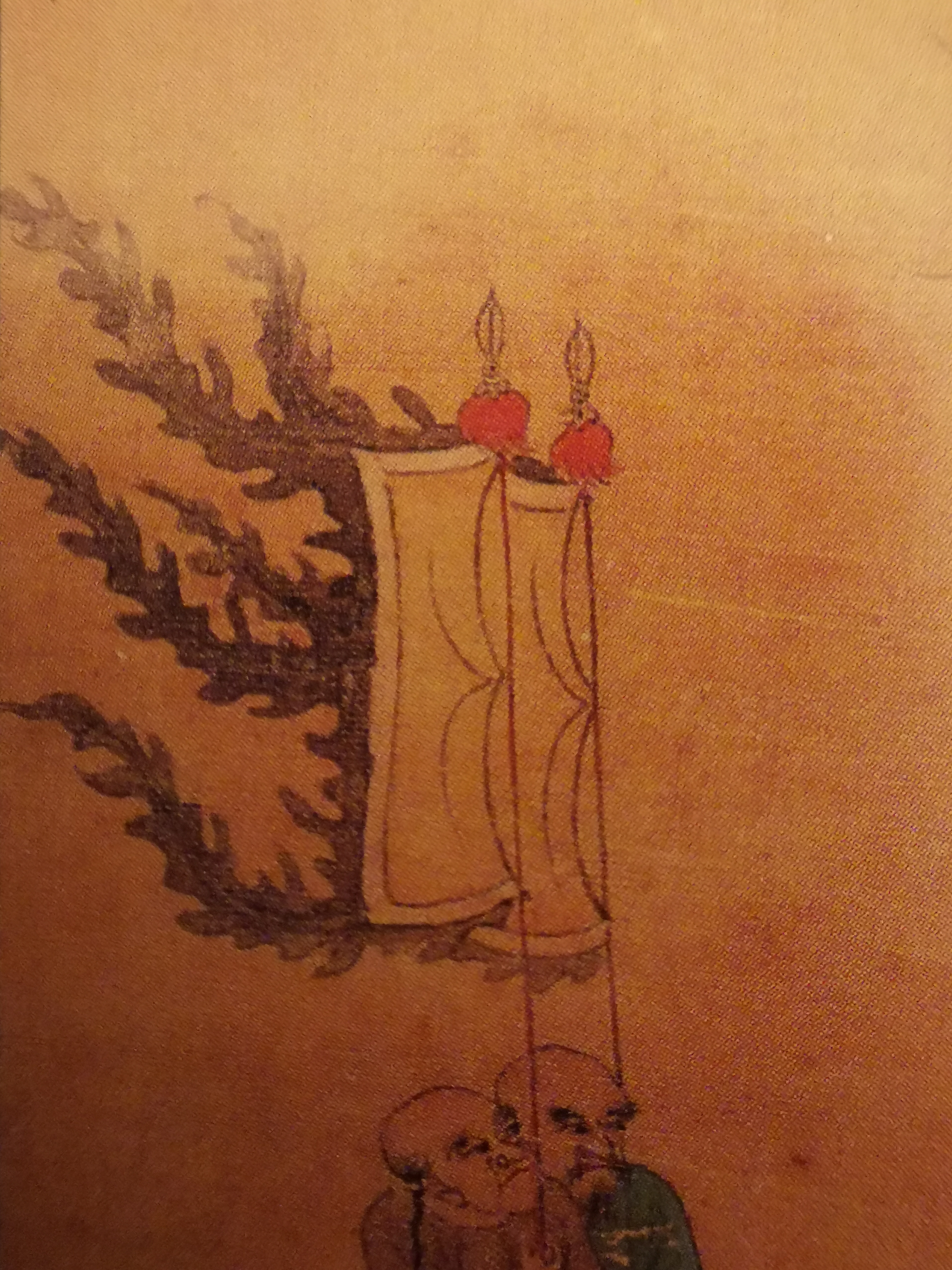
Jin dynasty (1115–1234)

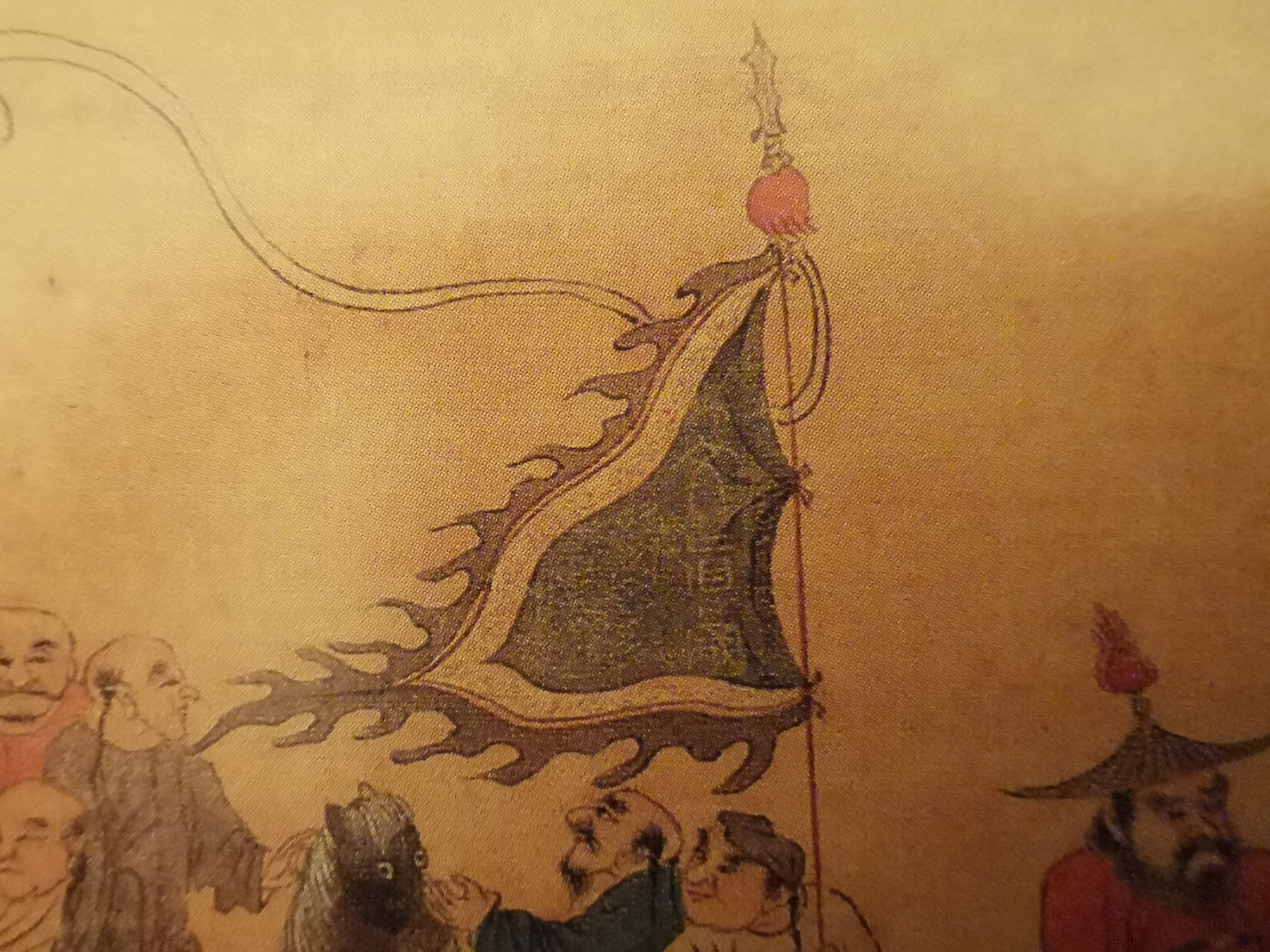
Jin dynasty (1115–1234)

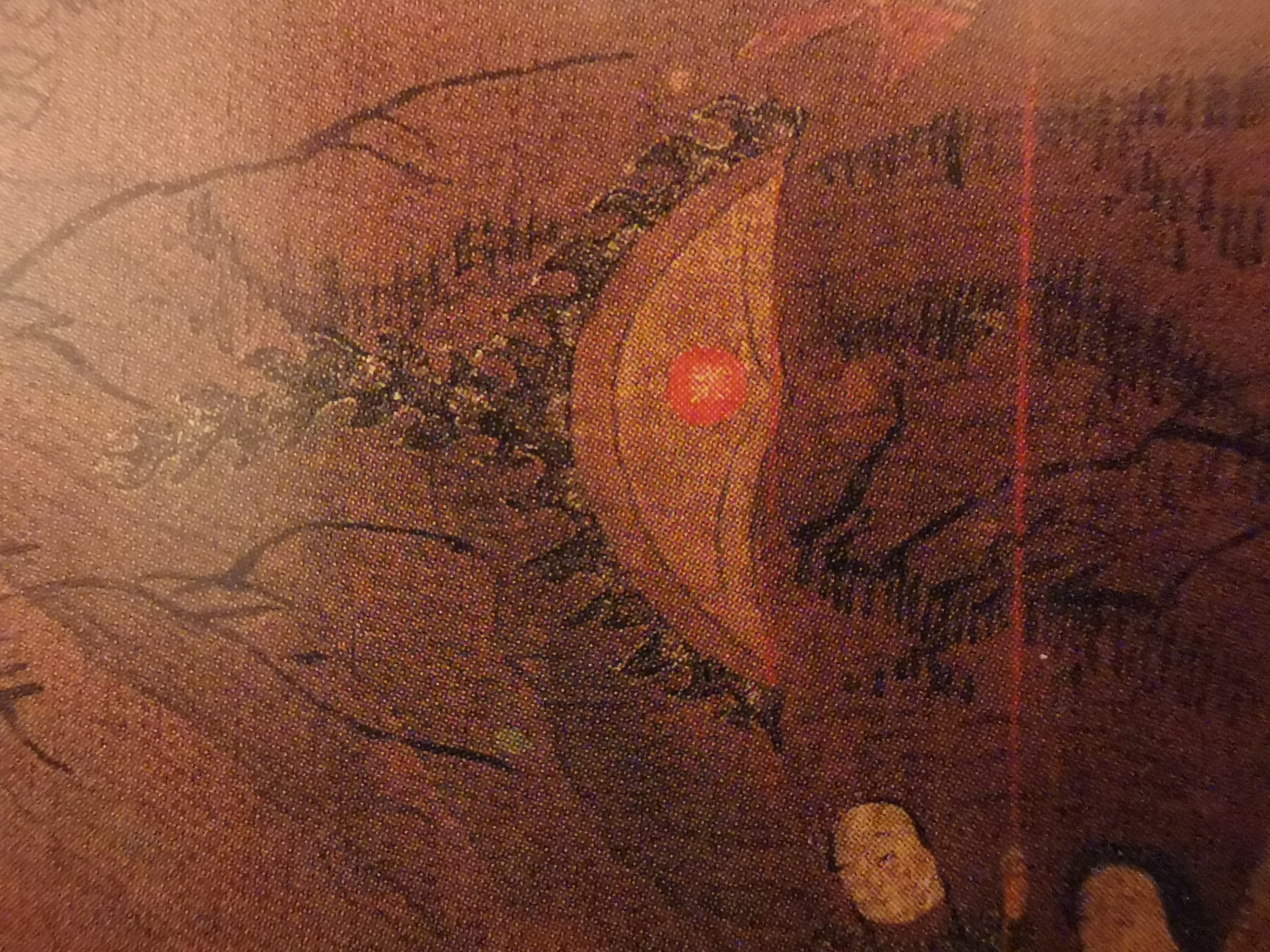
Yuan dynasty

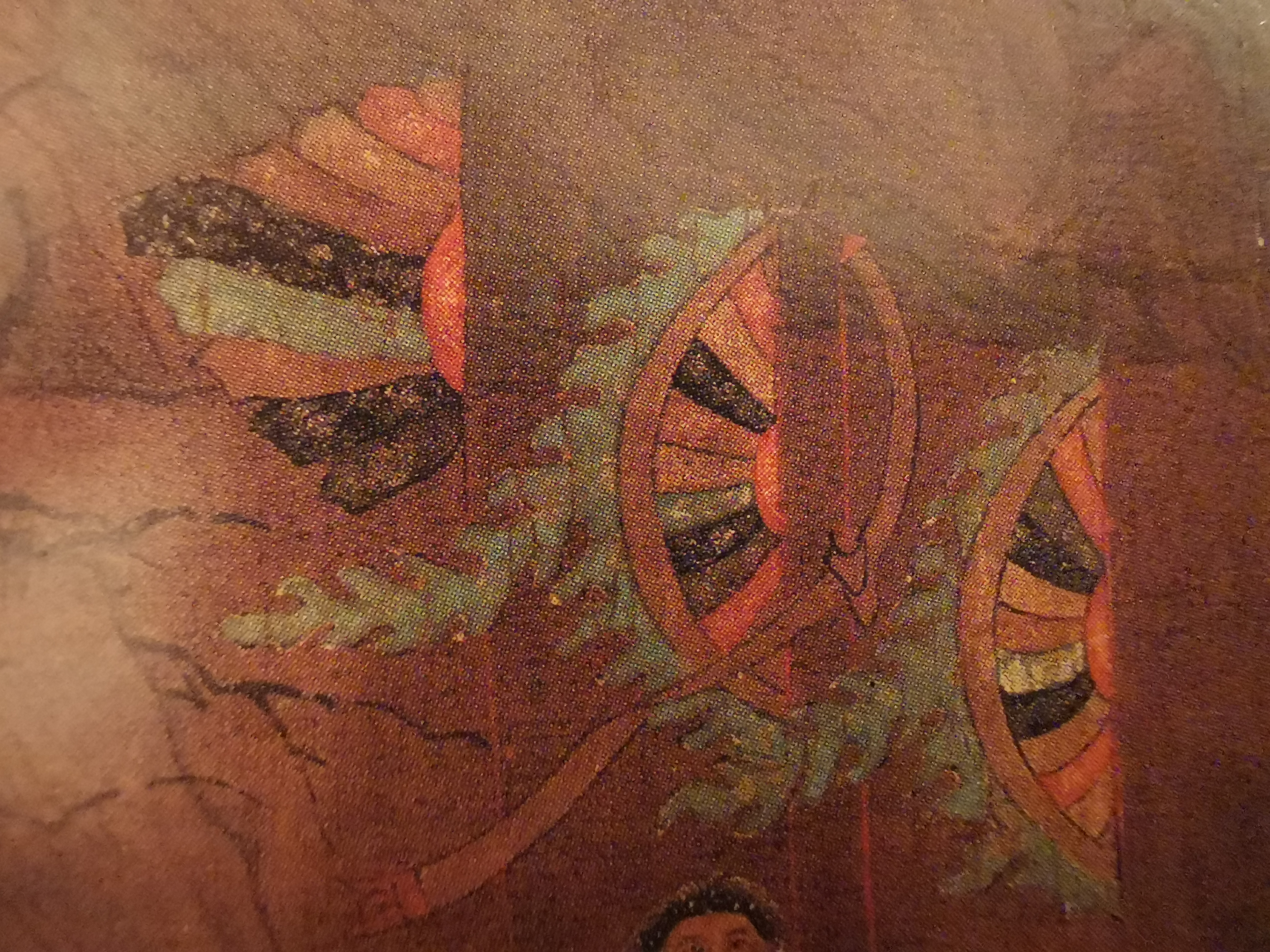
Yuan dynasty

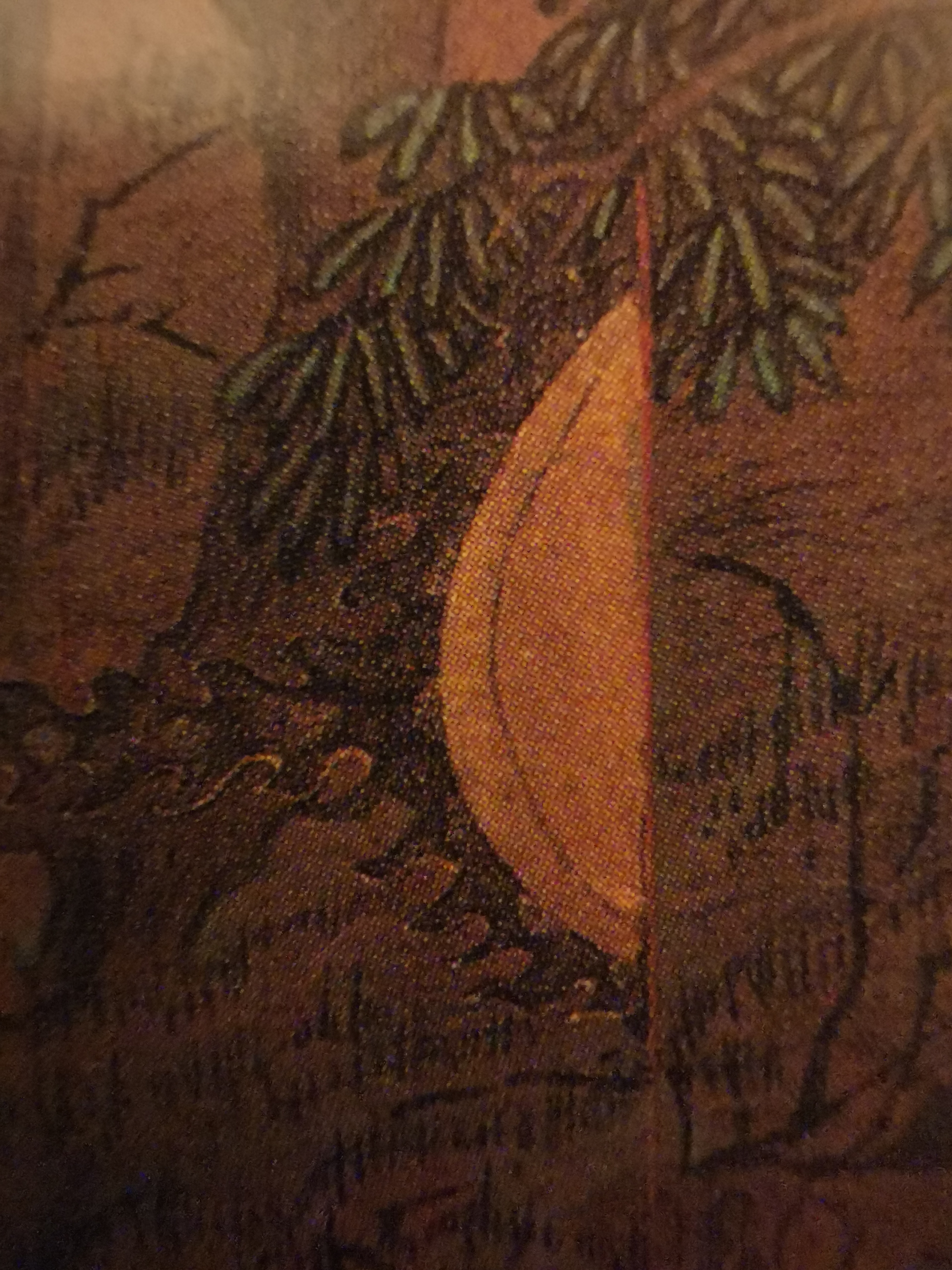
Yuan dynasty

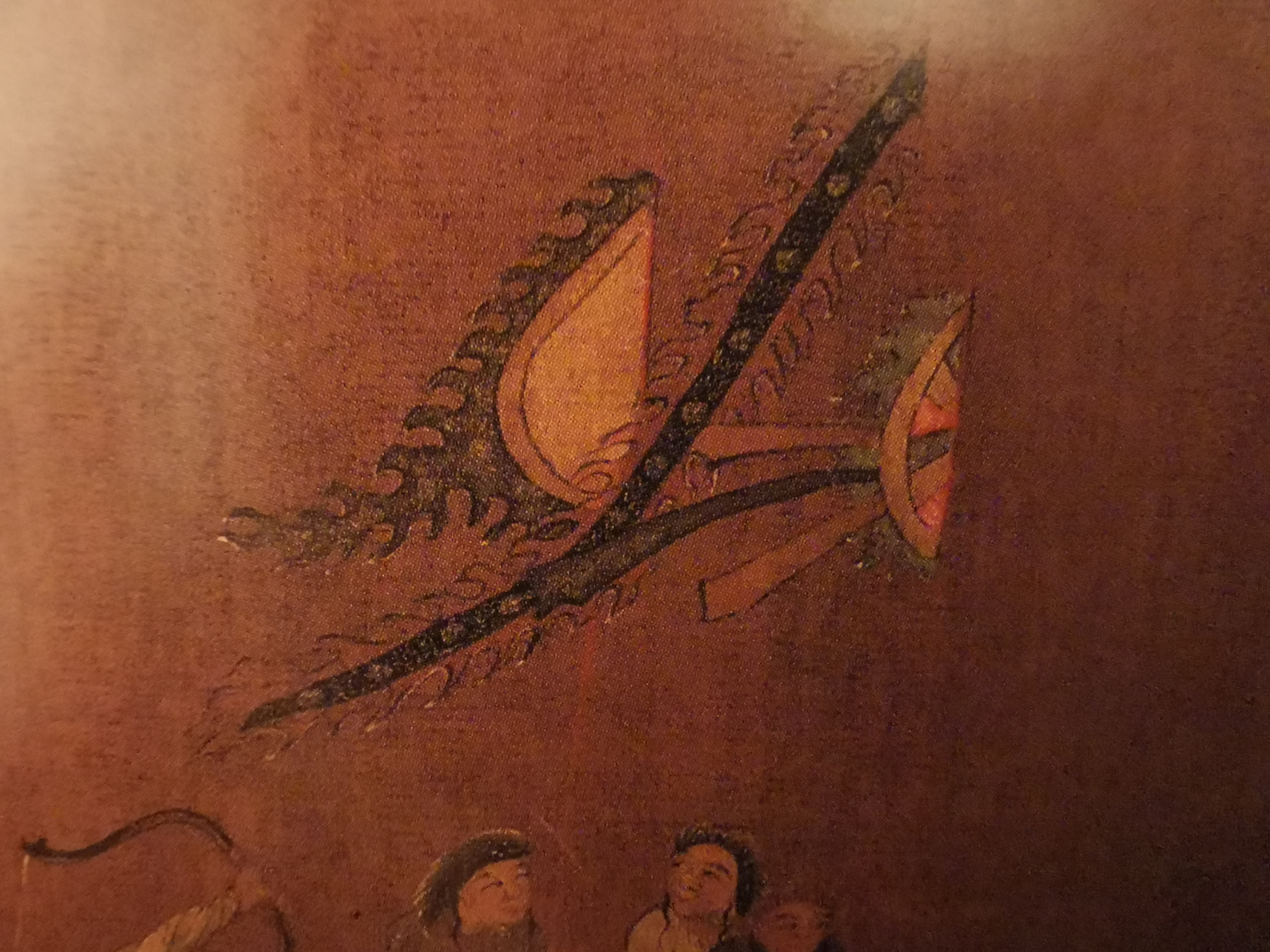
Yuan dynasty

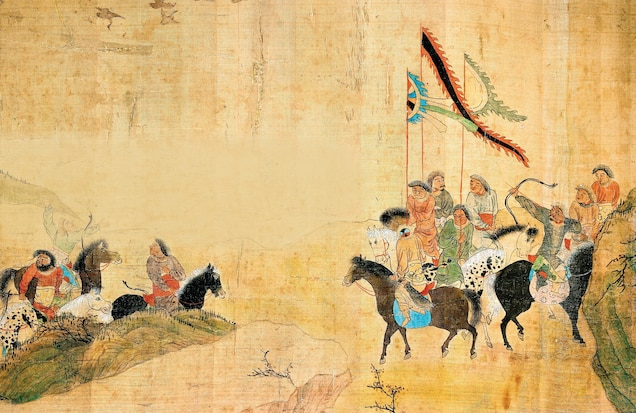
Yuan dynasty

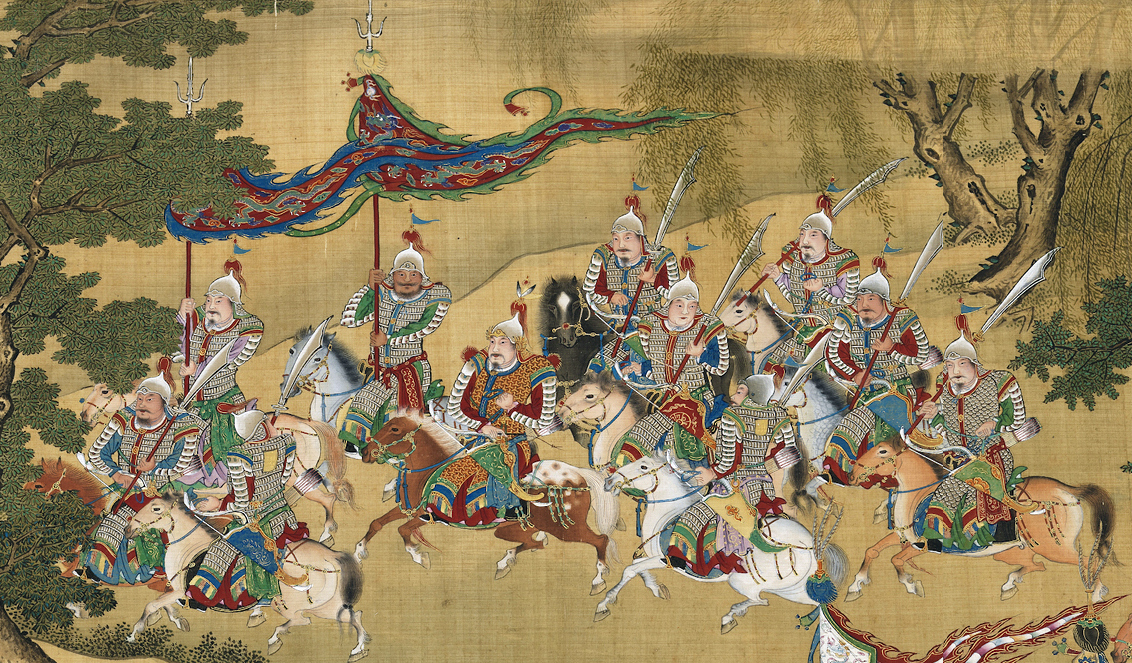
Ming dynasty

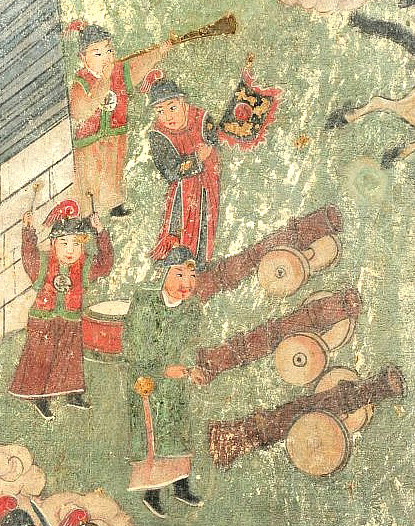
Ming dynasty

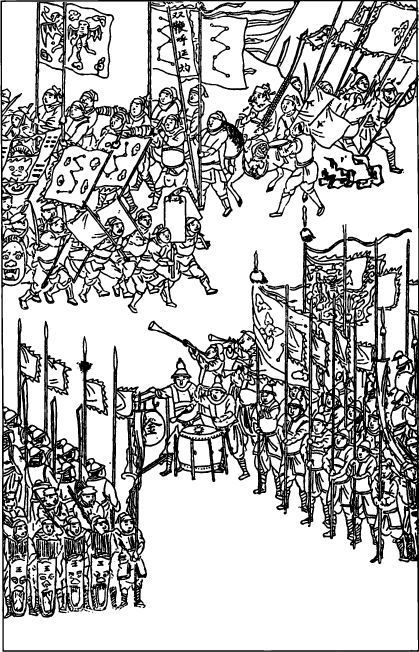
Ming dynasty

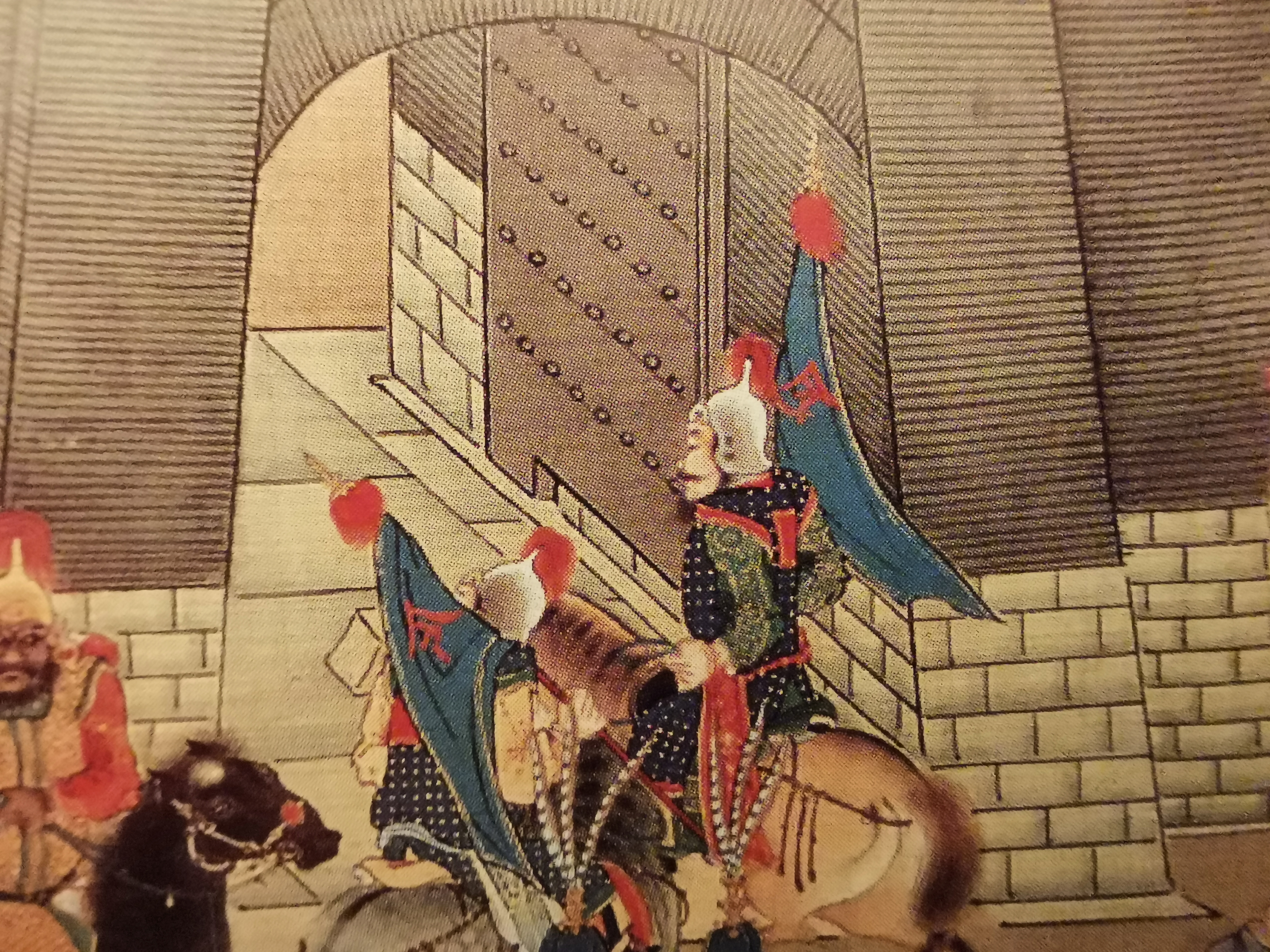
Ming dynasty

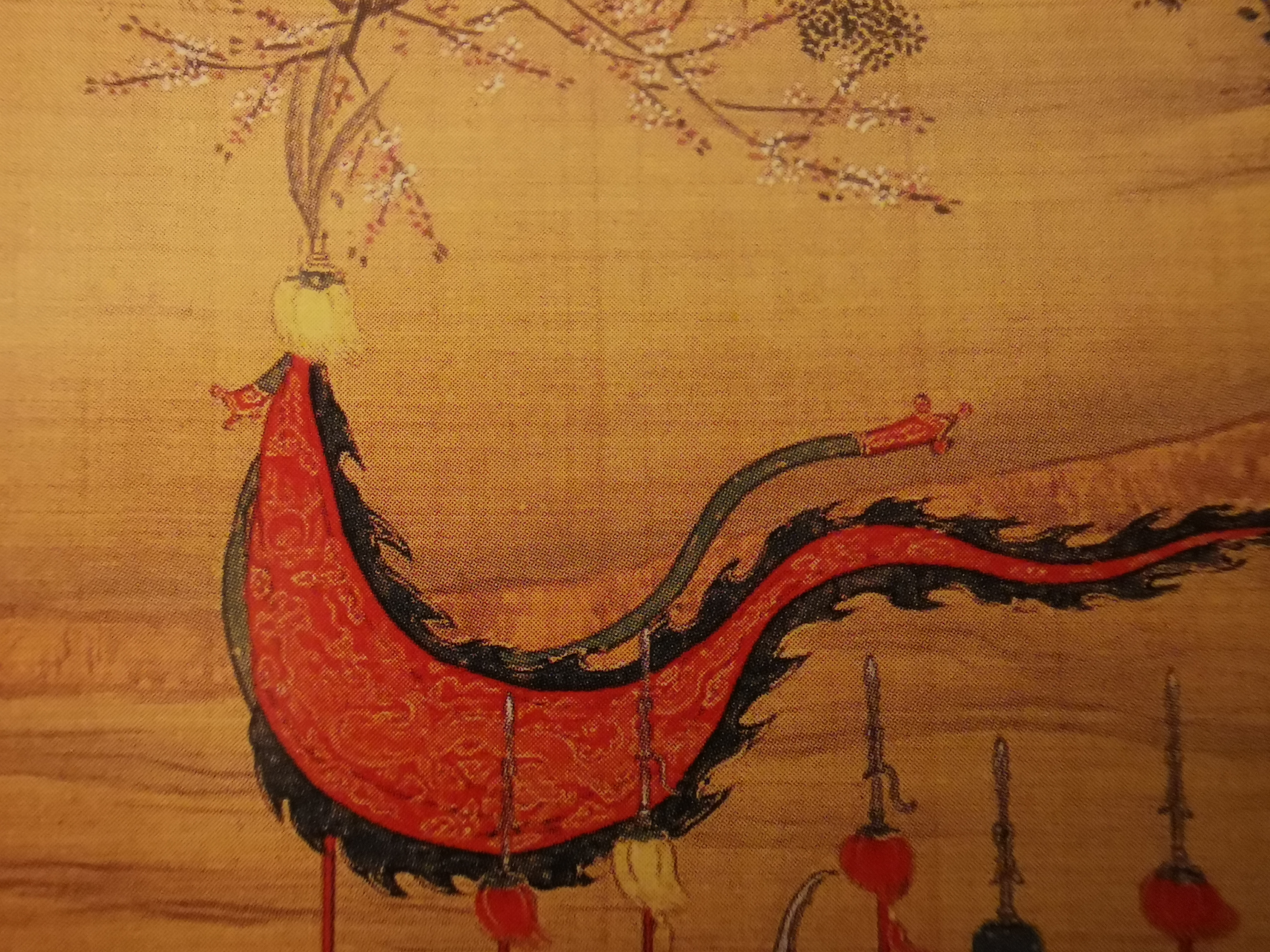
Ming dynasty

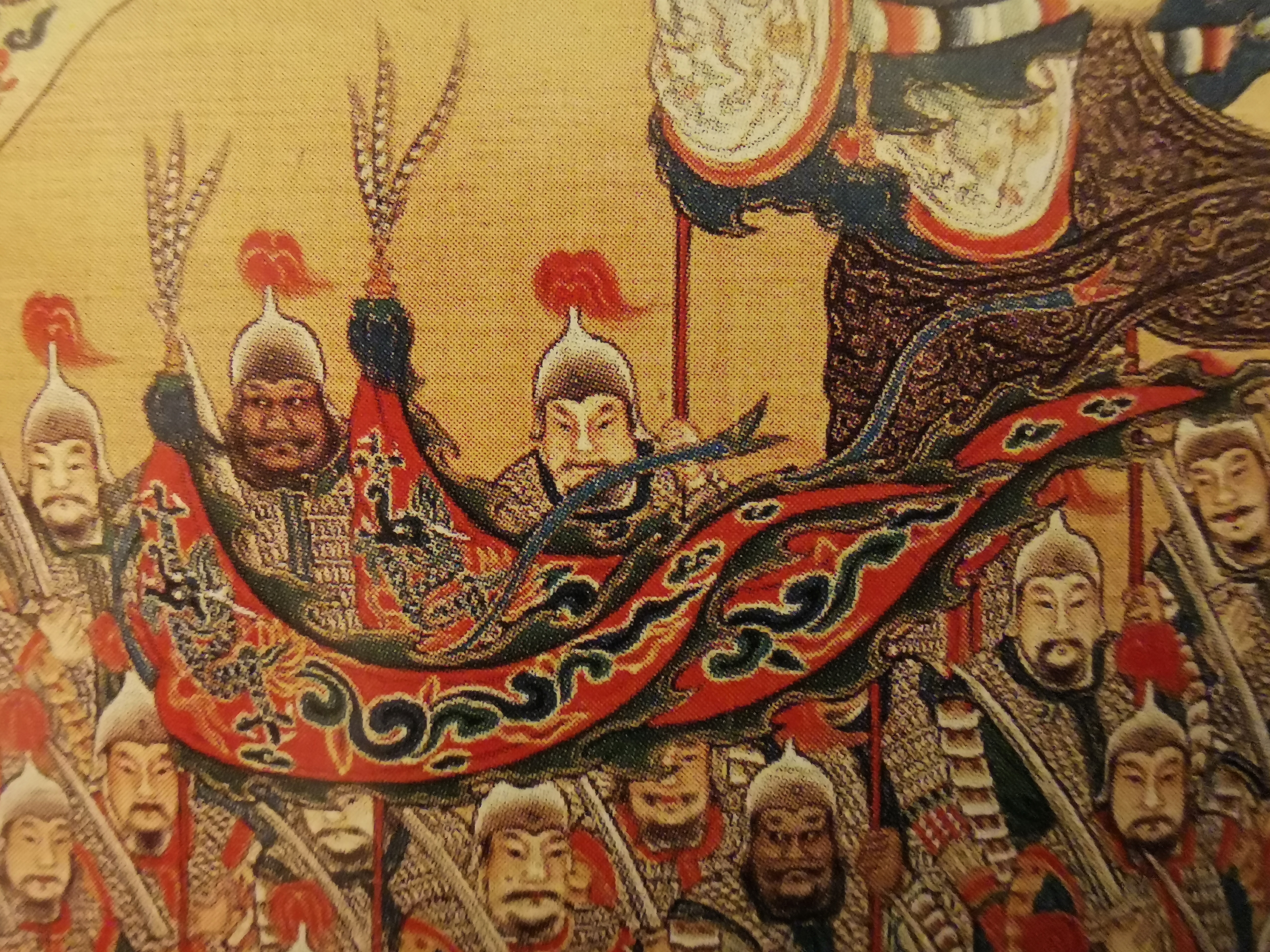
Ming dynasty

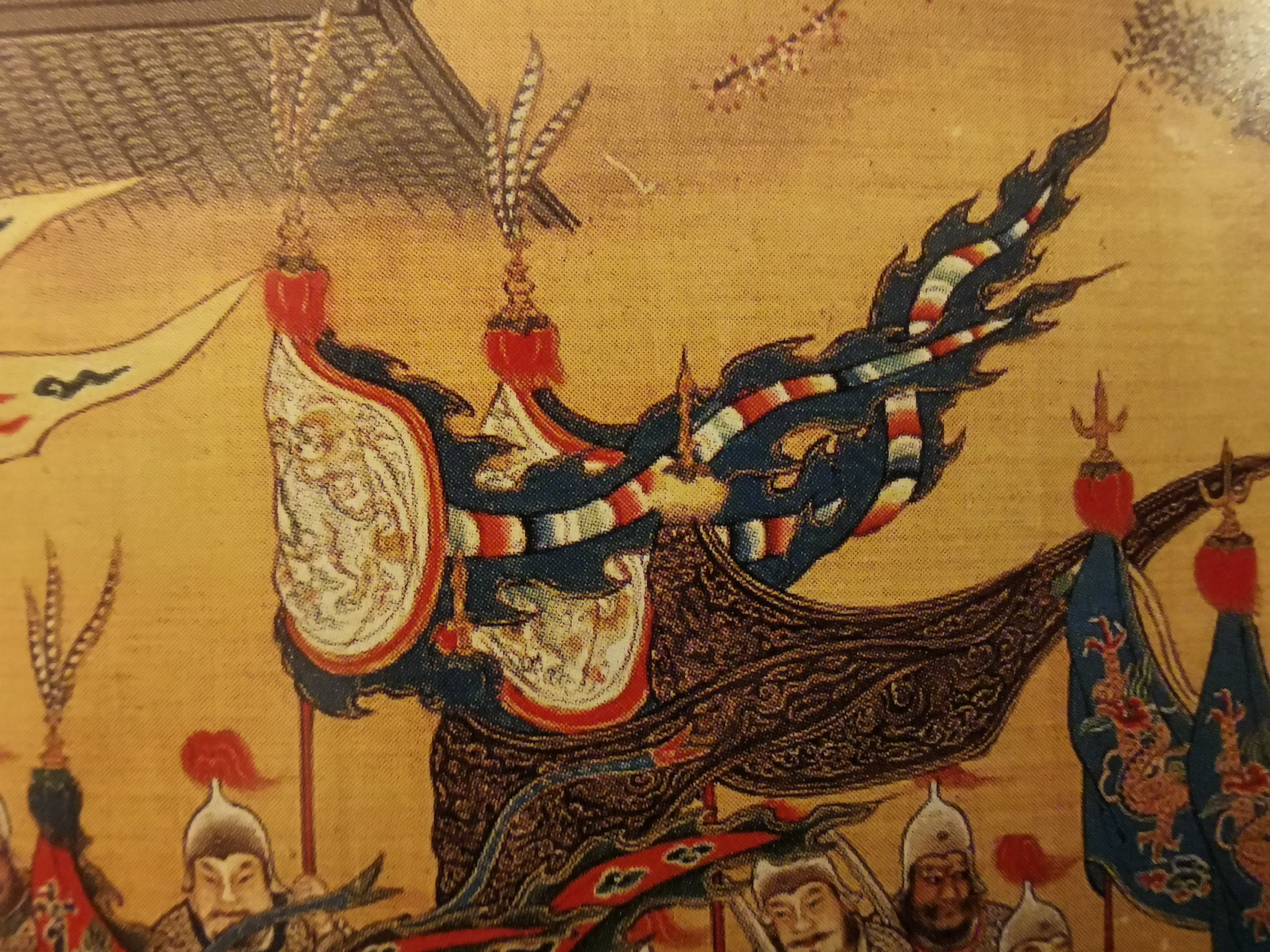
Ming dynasty

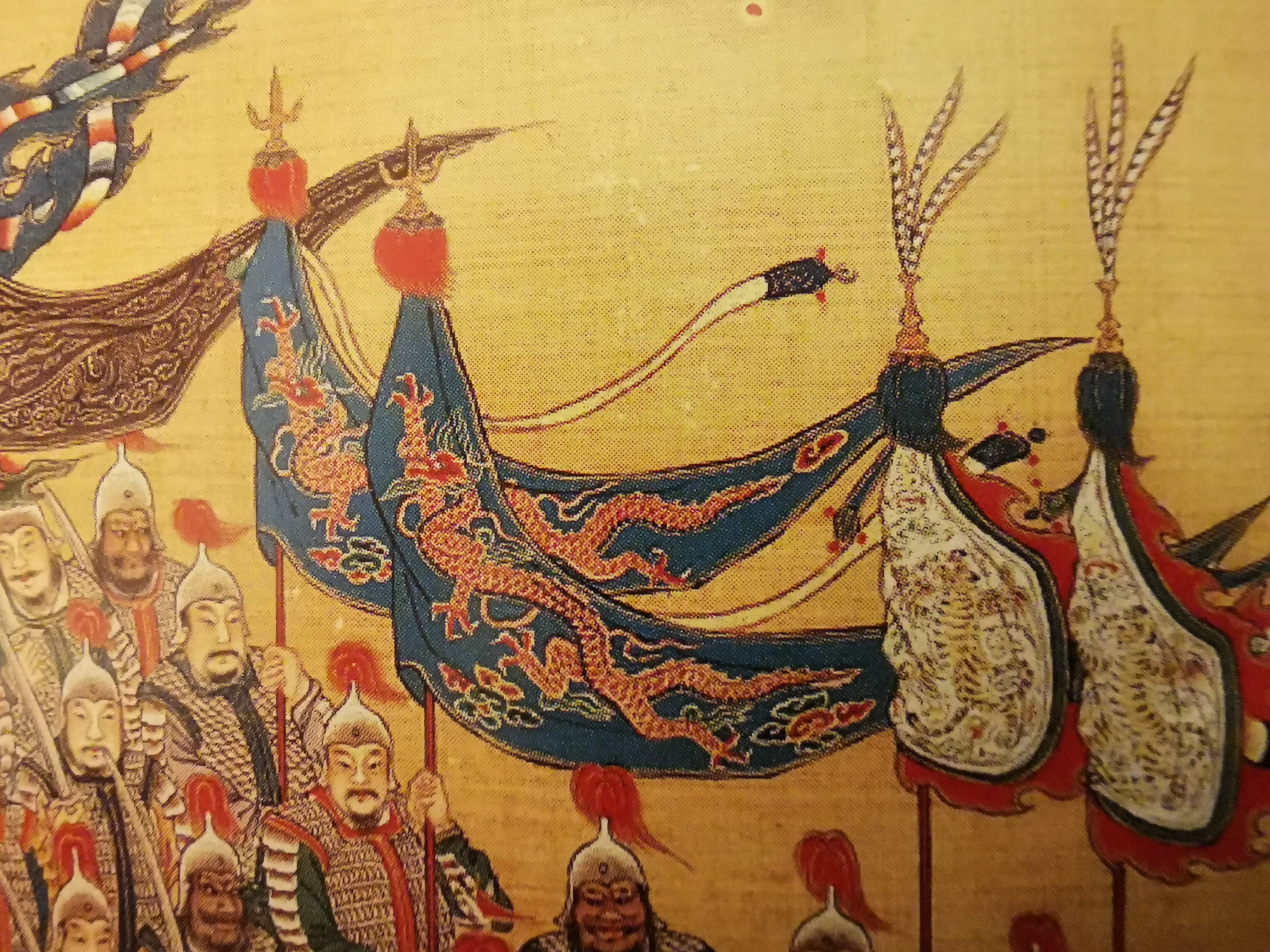
Ming dynasty

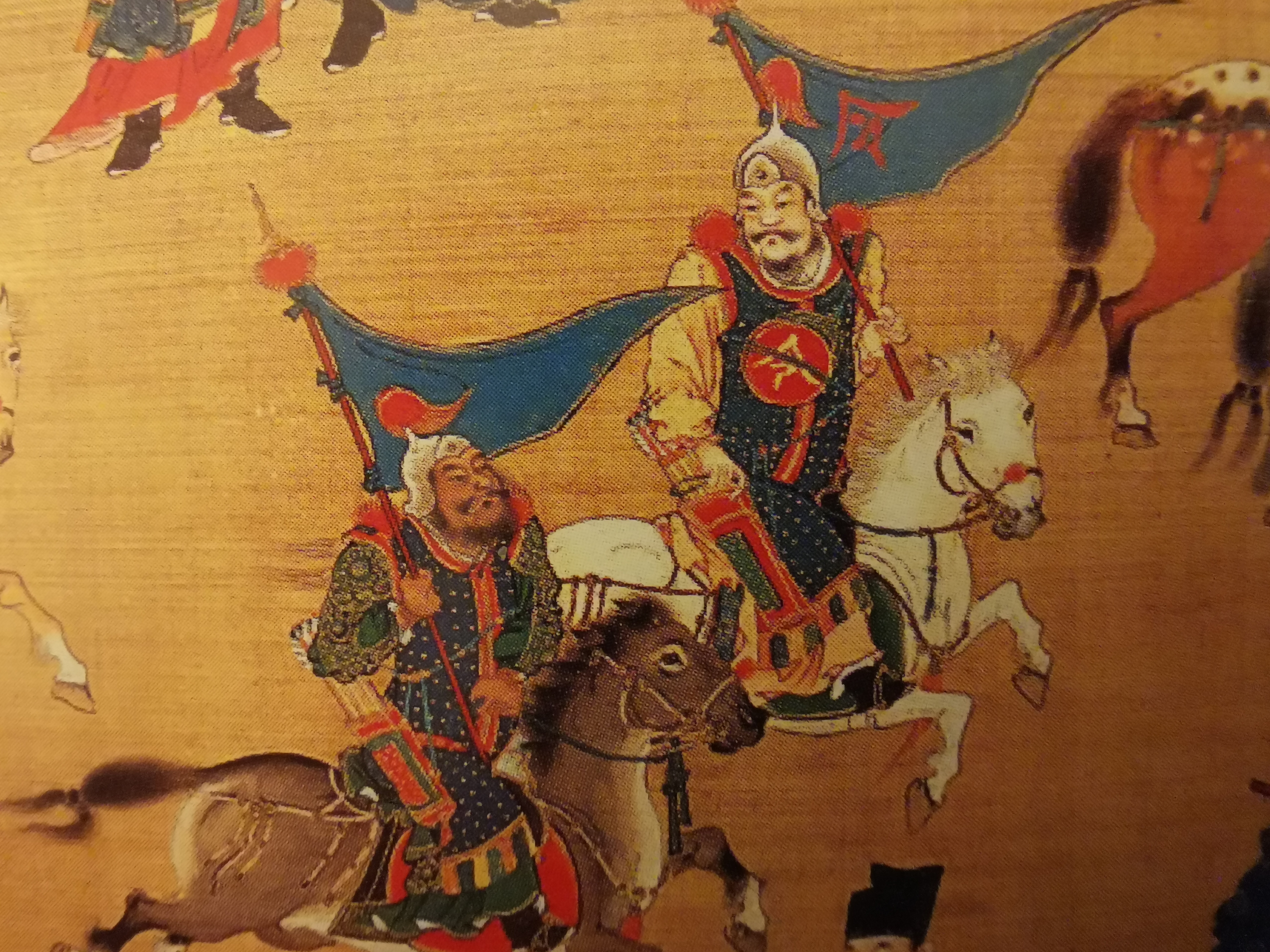
Ming dynasty

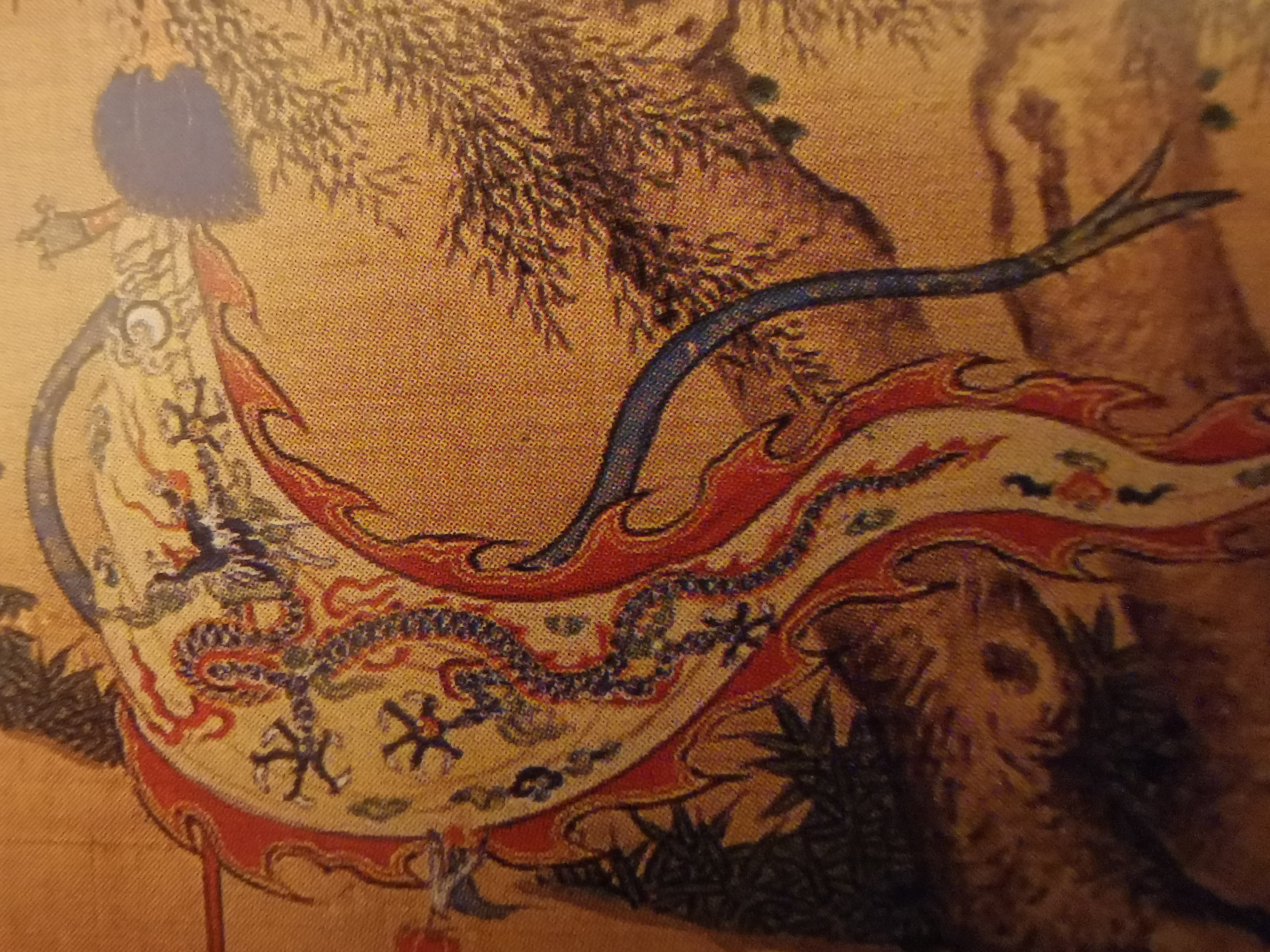
Ming dynasty

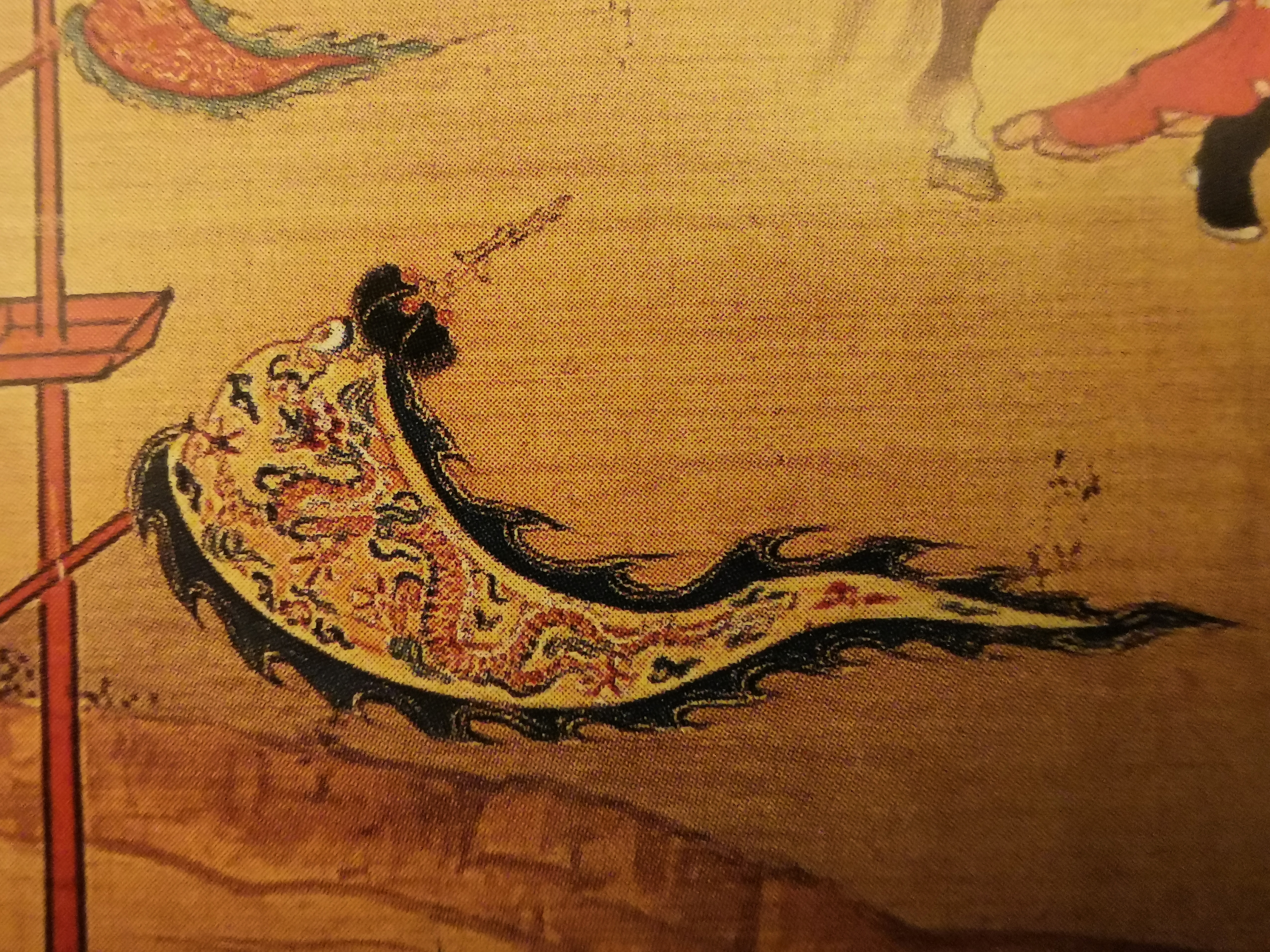
Ming dynasty

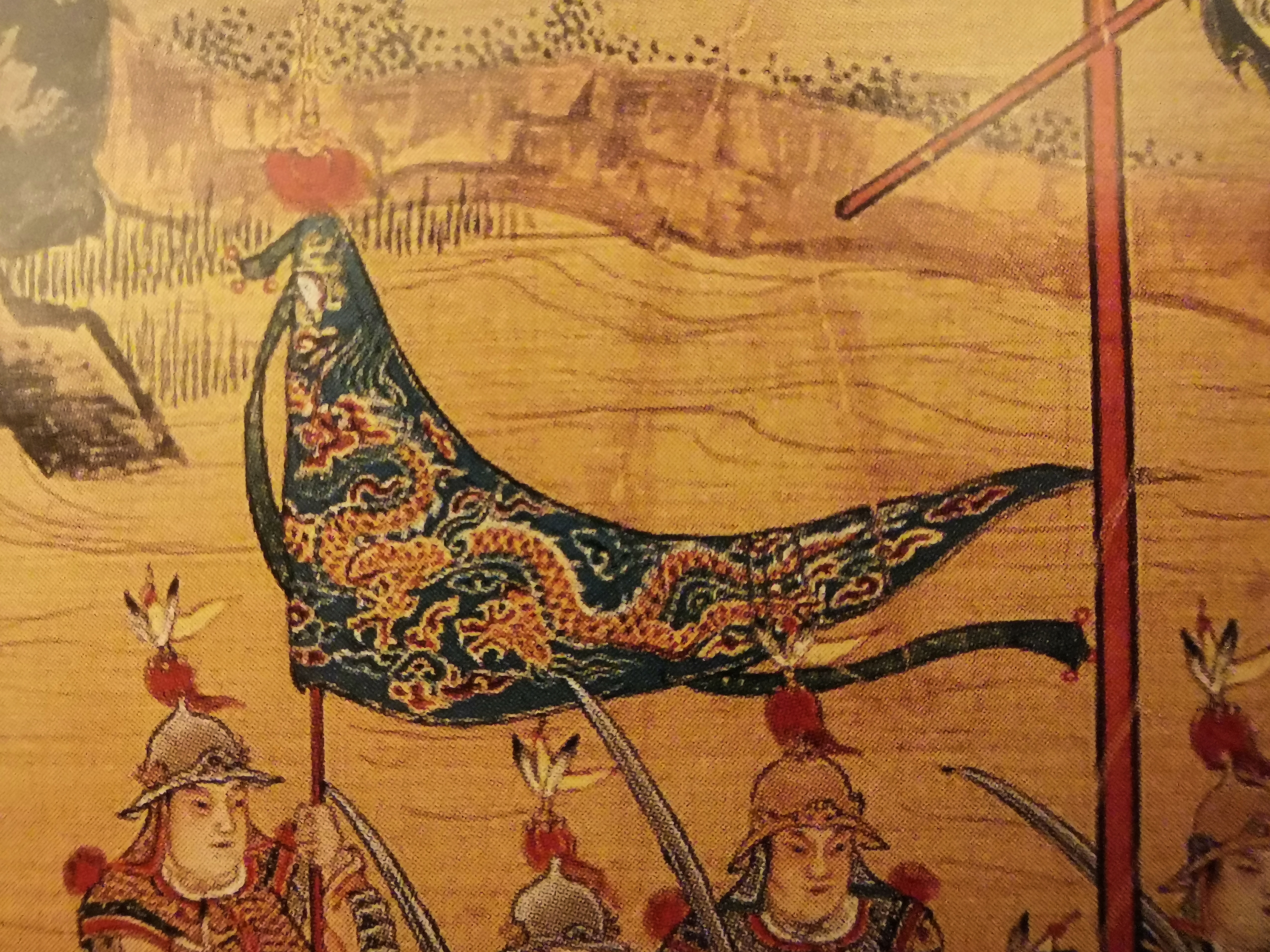
Ming dynasty

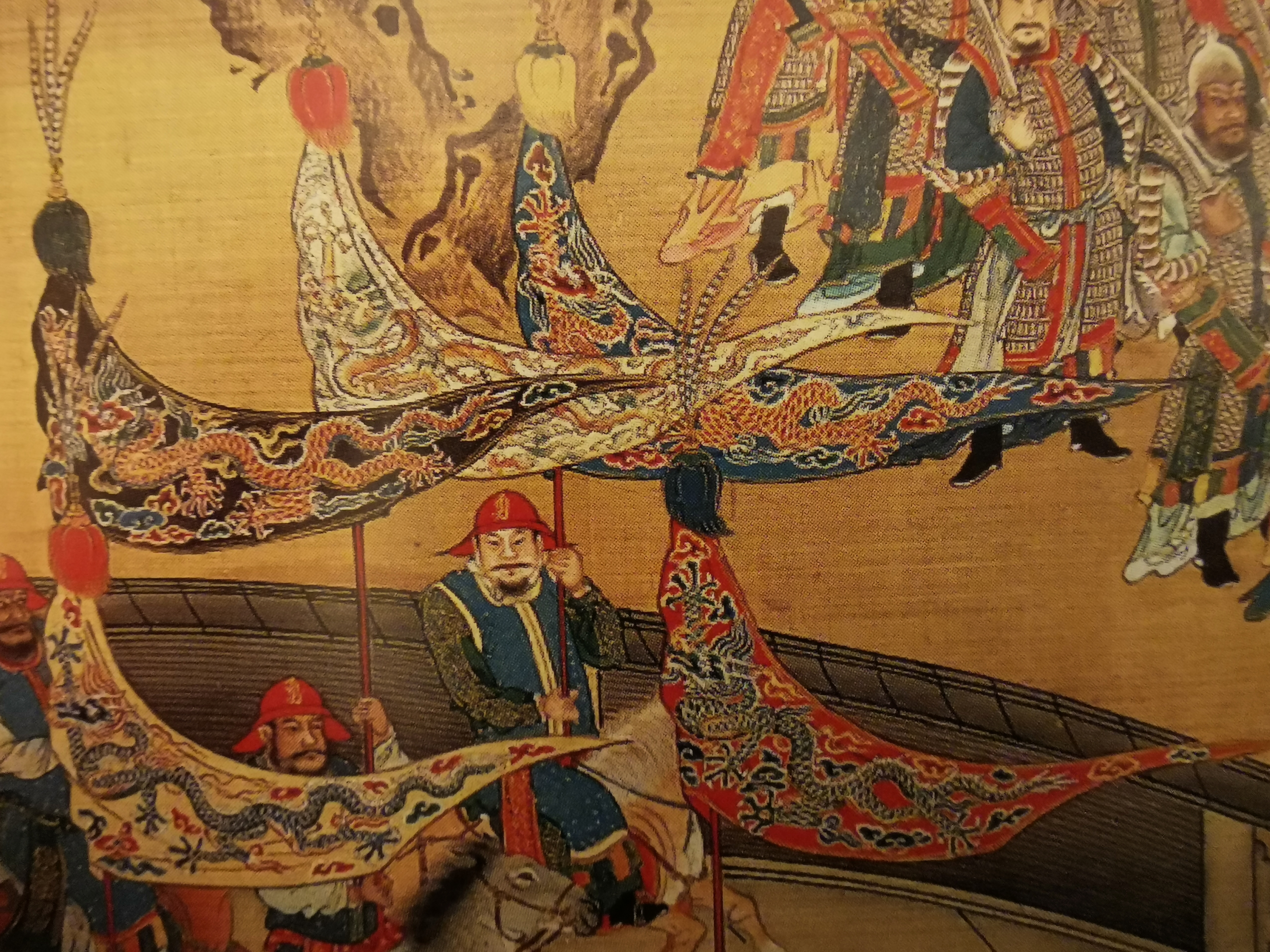
Ming dynasty

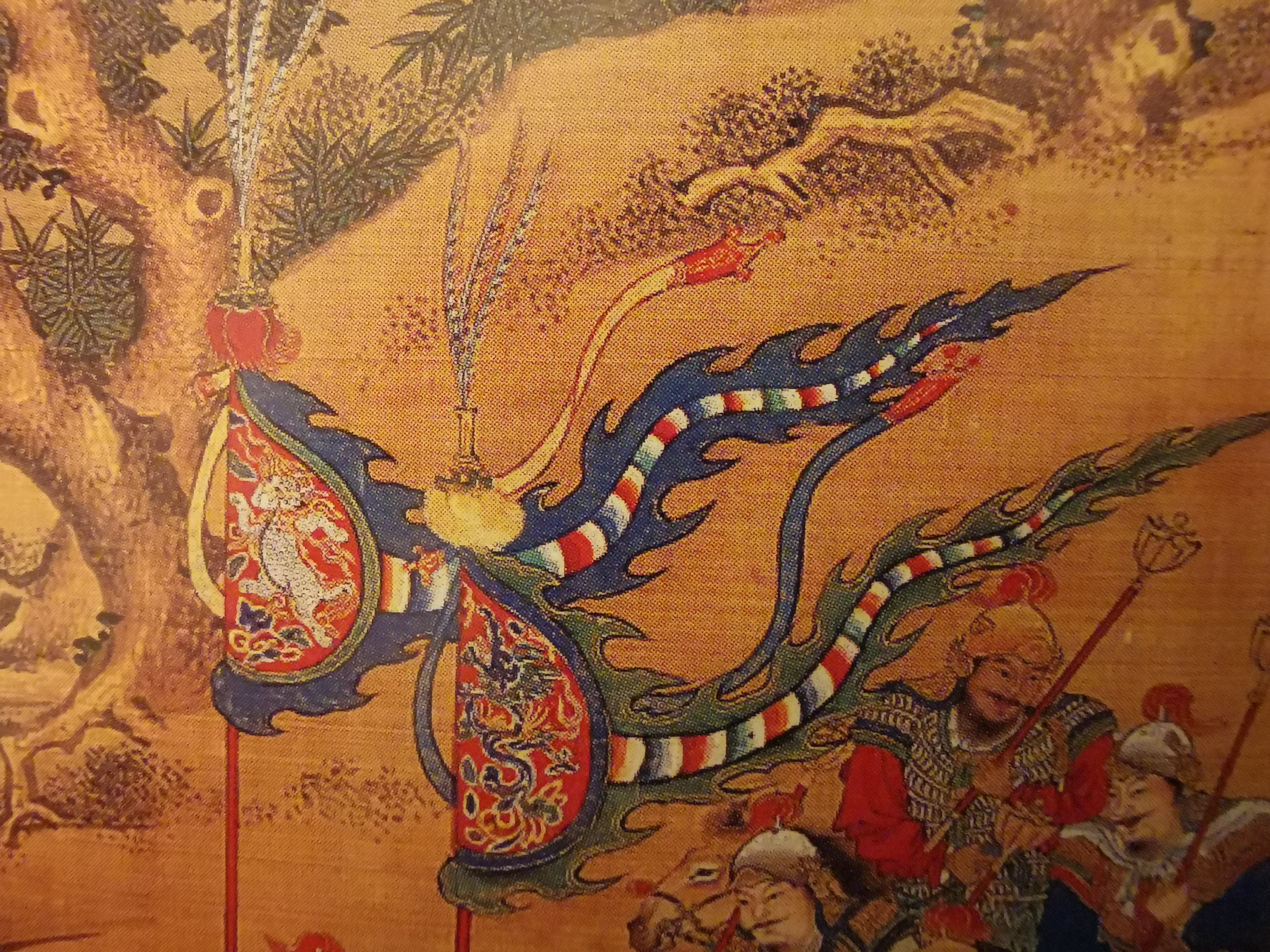
Ming dynasty

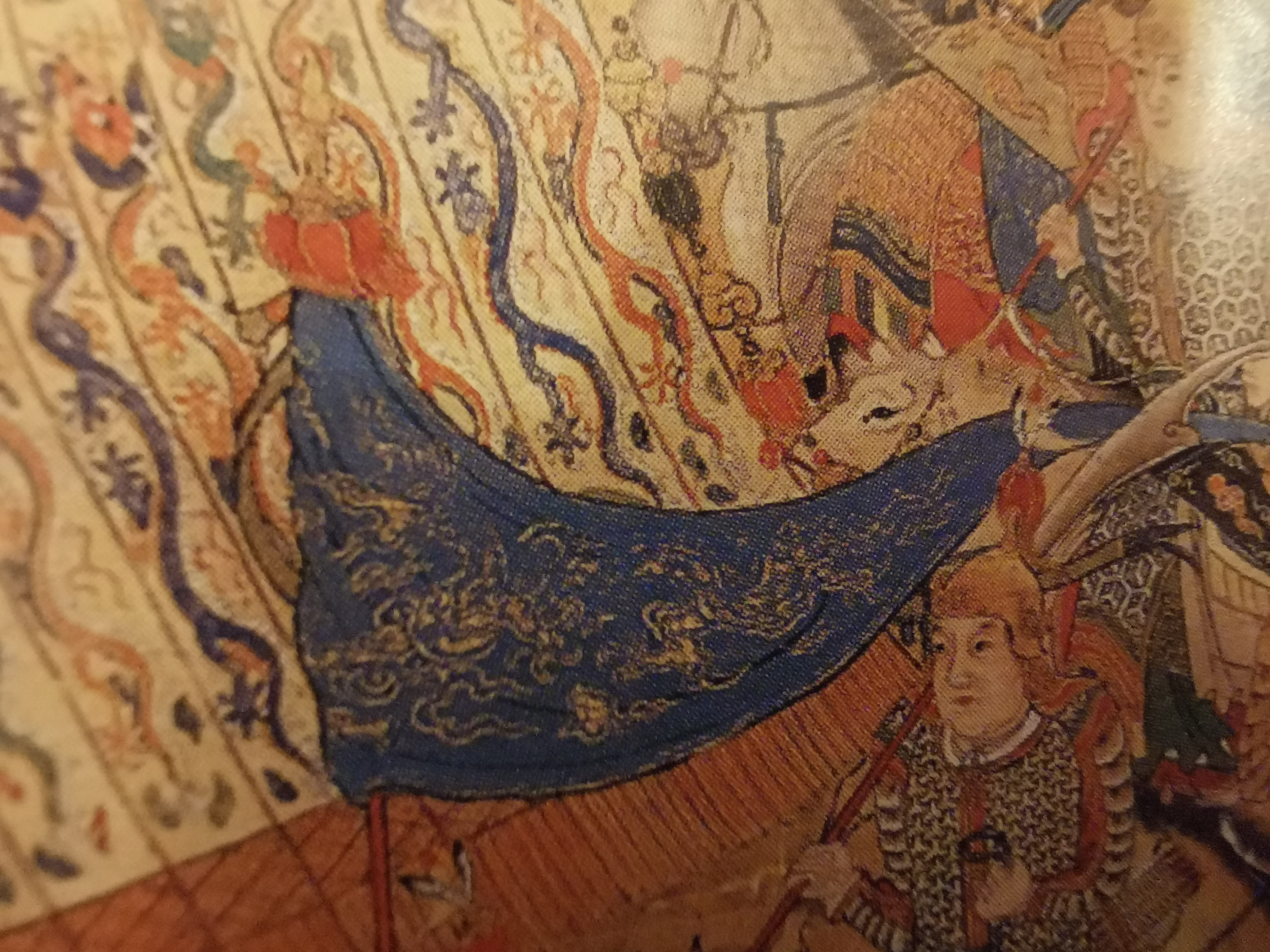
Ming dynasty

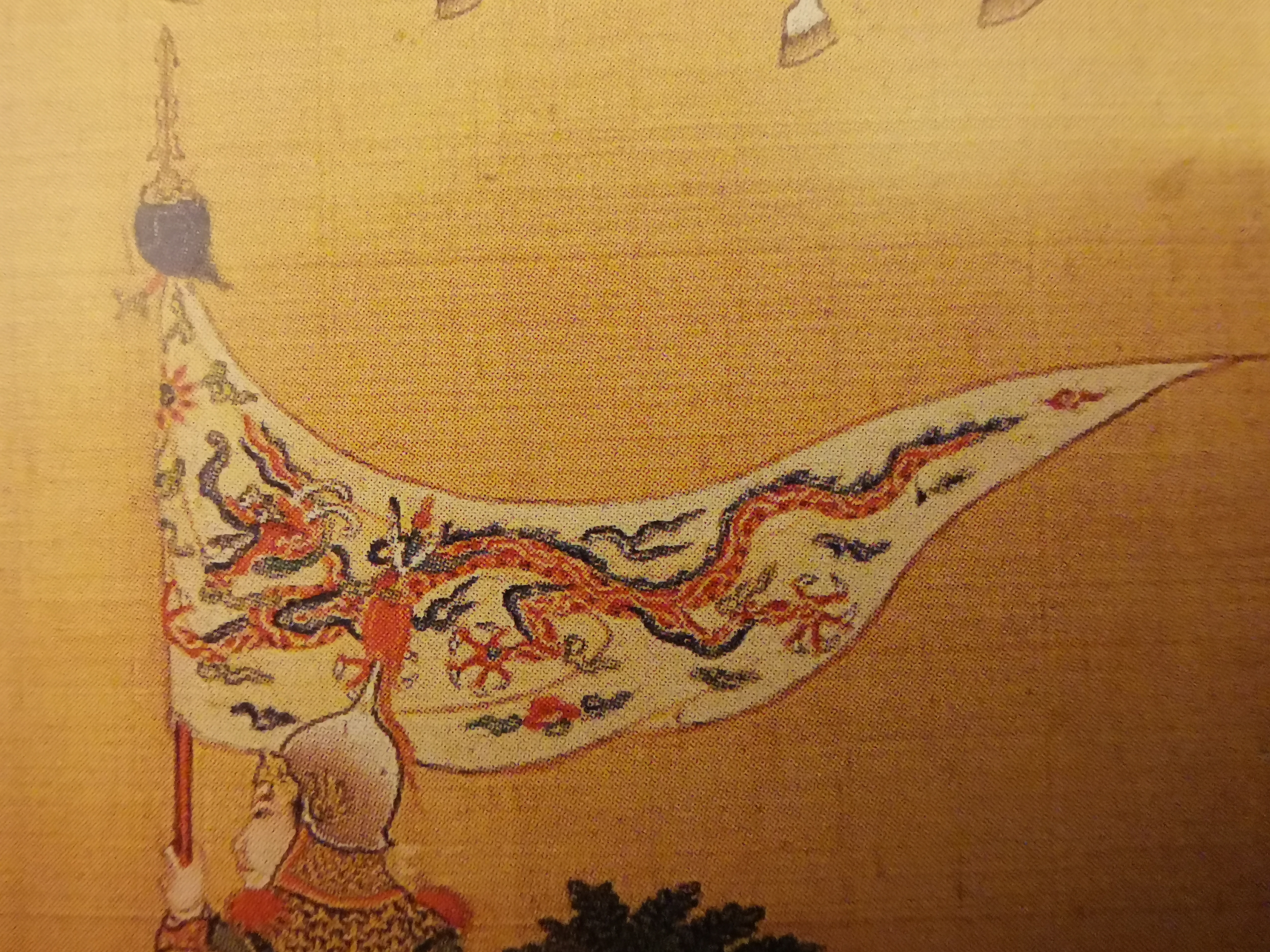
Ming dynasty

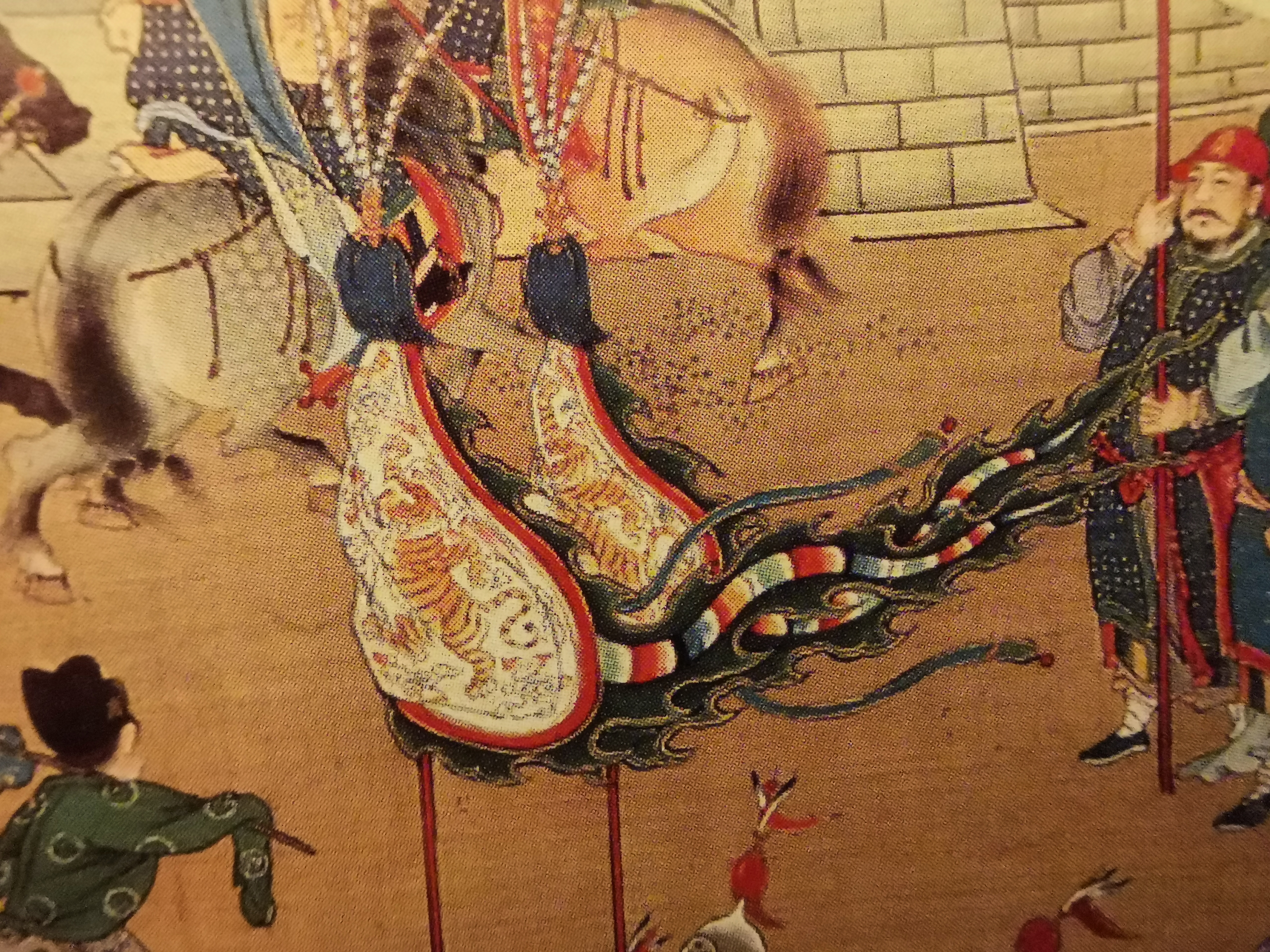
Ming dynasty

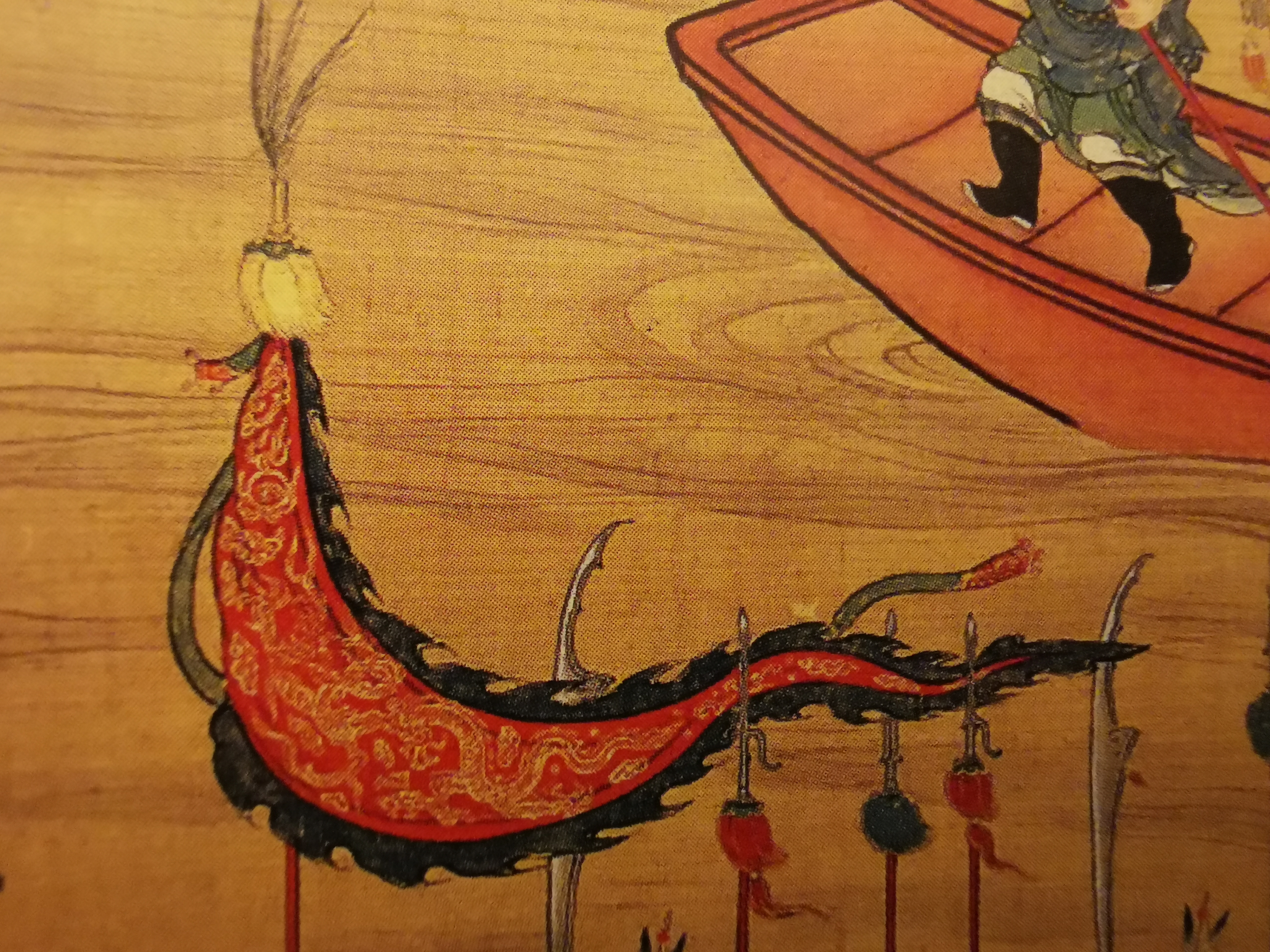
Ming dynasty

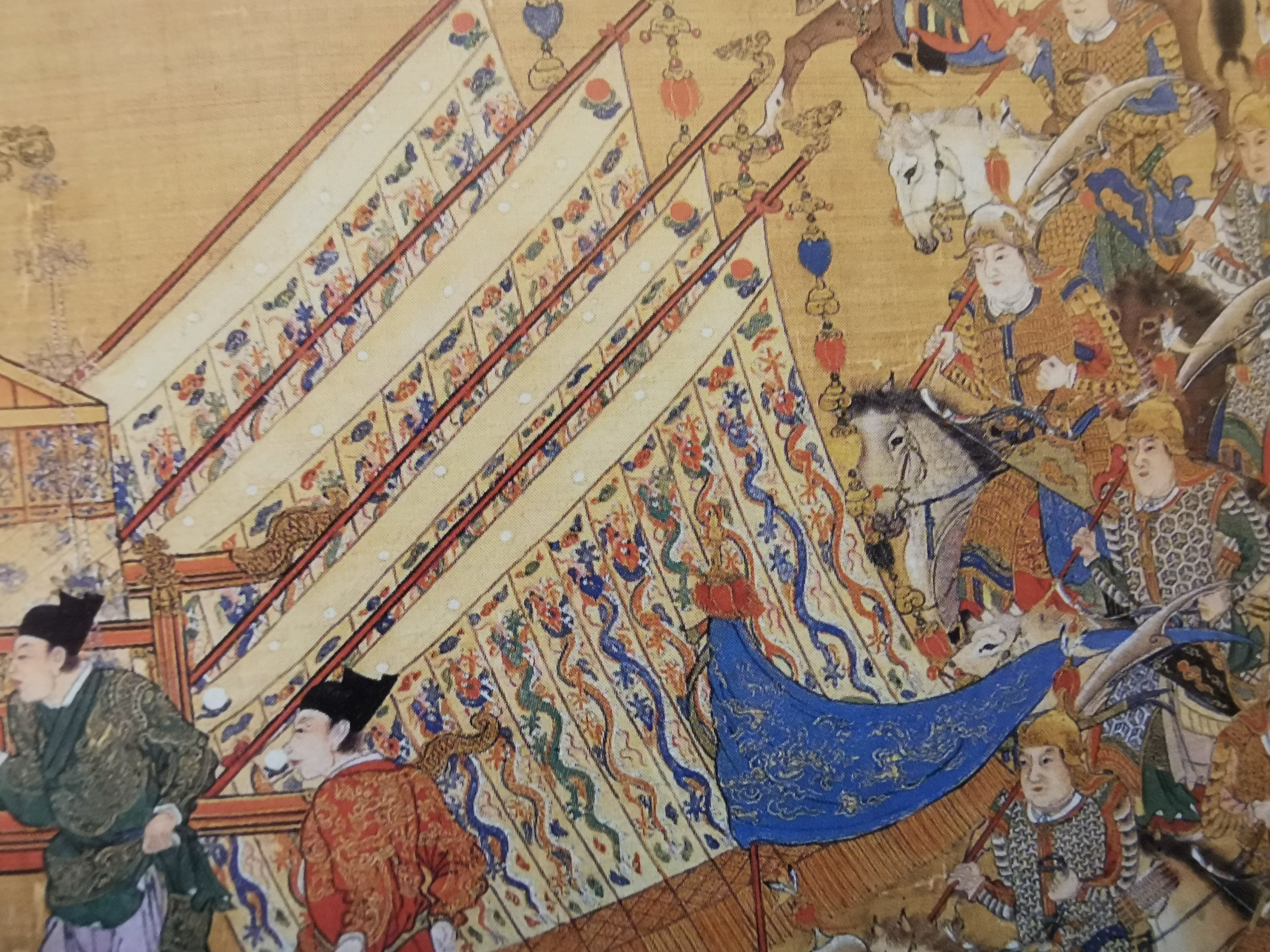
Ming dynasty

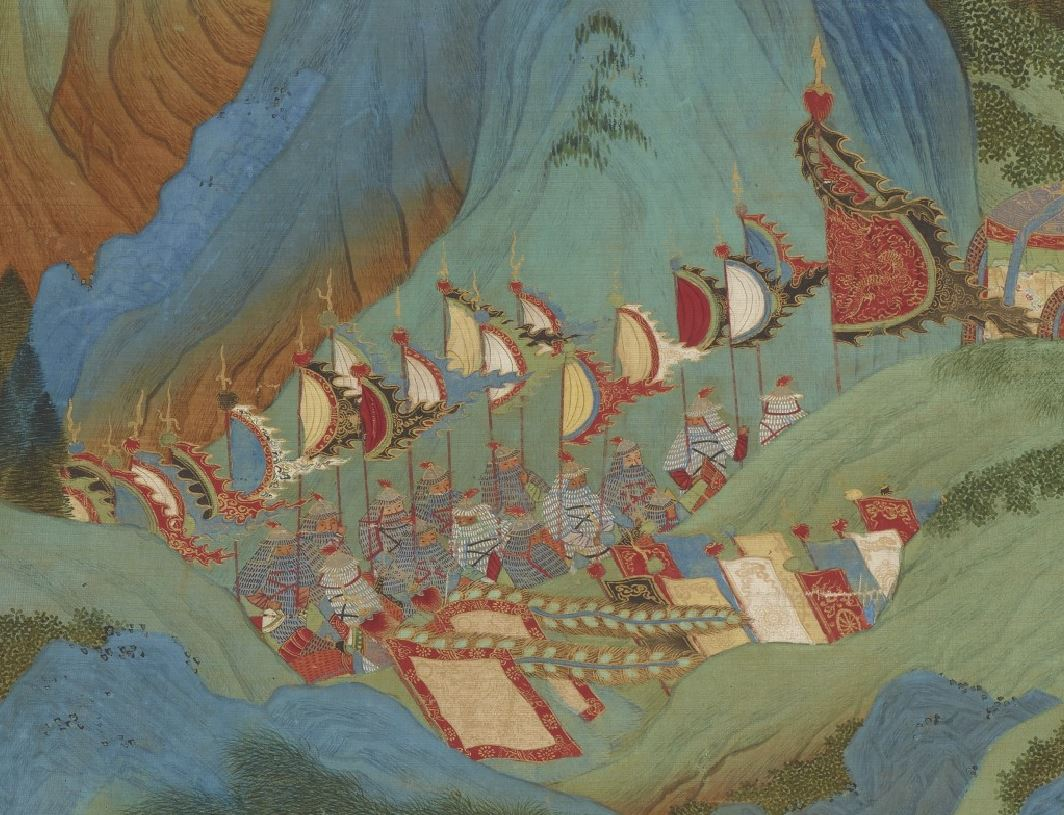
Ming dynasty

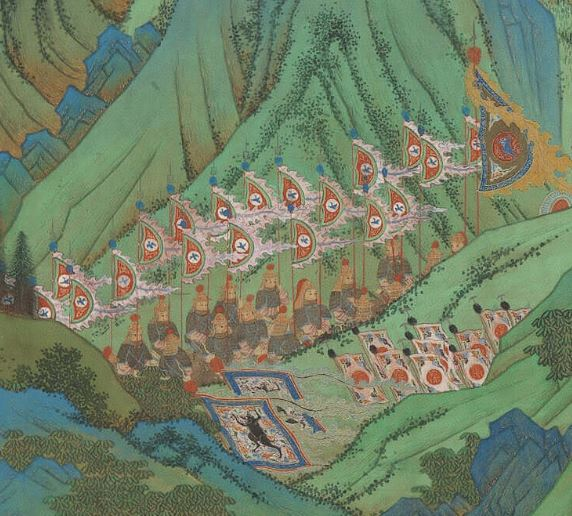
Ming dynasty

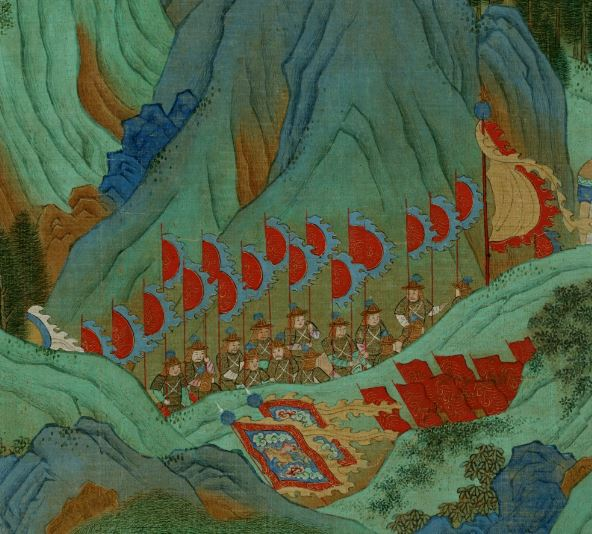
Ming dynasty

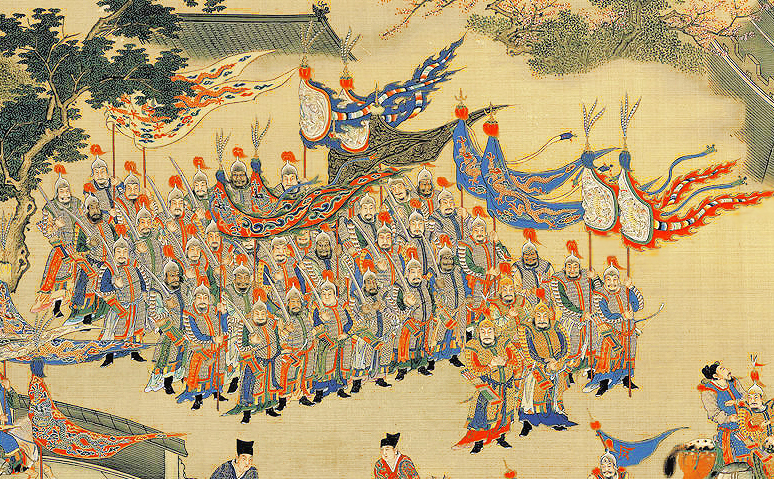
Ming dynasty

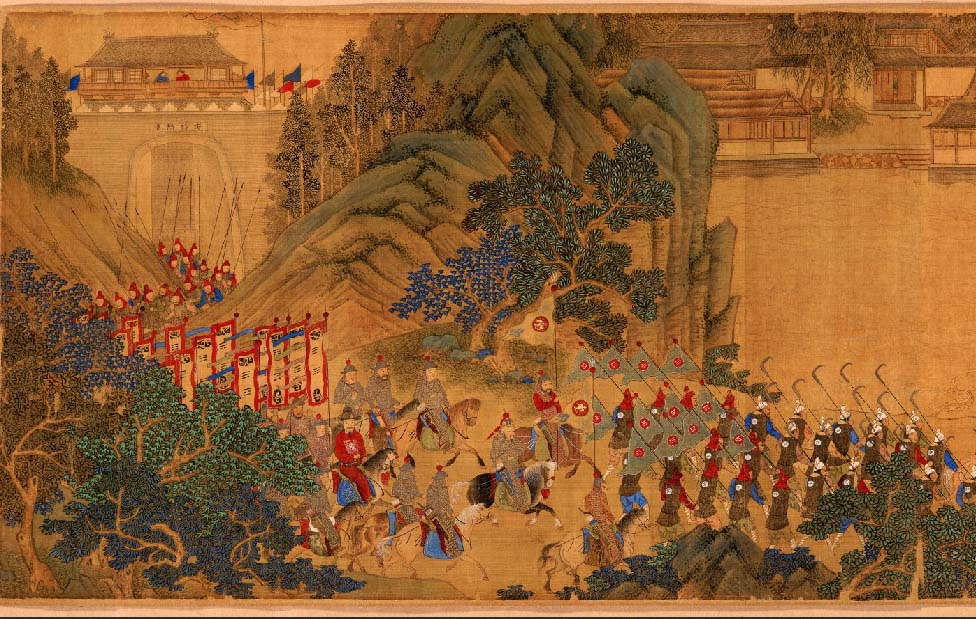
Ming dynasty

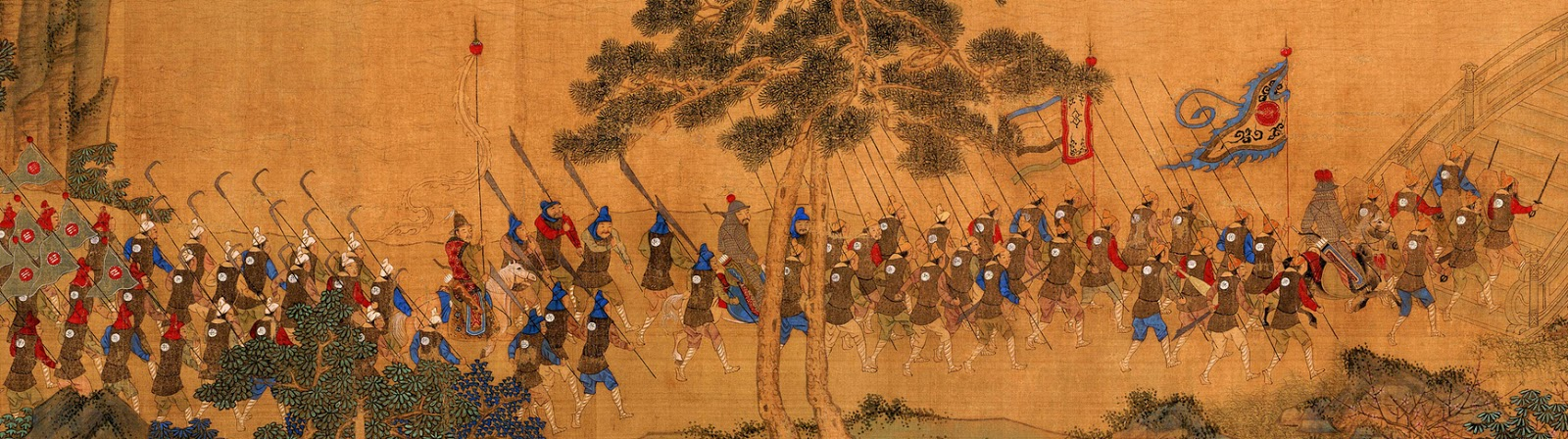
Ming dynasty

== Manchukuo ==
=== National flag ===
Flag	Duration	Use	Description
	1932–1945	Flag of Manchukuo	A yellow field with the red, blue, white, and black stripes of the first flag of the Republic of China (see above) in the canton.

=== Standards ===
Flag	Duration	Use	Description
	1935–1945	Imperial standard of the Emperor of Manchukuo	

=== Manchukuo Imperial Army and Navy ===
Flag	Duration	Use	Description
	1935–1945	War ensign of Manchukuo	Used by the Manchukuo Imperial Army.
	1935–1945	Flag of Navy Minister of Manchukuo	
	1932–1935	Flag of admiral of the Navy	
	1935–1945	Flag of admiral of the Navy	
	1932–1935	Flag of vice admiral of the Navy	
	1935–1945	Flag of vice admiral of the Navy	
	1932–1935	Flag of rear admiral of the Navy	
	1935–1945	Flag of rear admiral of the Navy	
	1932–1935	Flag of 1st class commodore of the Navy	
	1935–1945	Flag of 1st class commodore of the Navy	
	1935–1945	Flag of commander (2nd class commodore) of the Navy	
	1935–1945	Flag of superior commander of the Navy	

=== Government flags ===
Flag	Duration	Use	Description
	1935–1945	Flag of the Manchukuo Shipping Office	
	1935–1945	Flag of the Manchukuo Coast Guard	
	1935–1945	Flag of Manchukuo Marine Transport	

=== Police flags ===
Flag	Duration	Use	Description
	1932–1945	Flag of the Manchukuo Marine Police	
	1932–1945	Flag of the Chief of Civil Administration	
	1932–1945	Flag of the Chief of Police Civil Administration	Used by the Manchukuo Marine Police.
	1932–1945	Flag of the Chief of Marine Police	
	1932–1945	Flag of the Marine Police Senior Officer at Present Afloat	

=== Political flags ===
Flag	Duration	Use	Description
	1931–1945	Flag of the Concordia Association	Contains the Chinese characters 協和.
	1931–1943	Flag of the Russian Fascist Party	Minor Russian émigré movement that was based in Manchukuo.

=== Other ===
Flag	Duration	Use	Description
	1932–1945	Flag of the Manchukuo Post	Postal flag of Manchukuo.
	1932–1945	Flag of the Boy Scouts of Manchukuo	
	1906–1945	Flag of the South Manchuria Railway	

== Other Japanese puppet states ==
Flag	Duration	Use	Description
	1937–1938	Flag of the Great Way Government	
	1943	Flag of the New People's Society	New People's Society (新民會, "Xinminhui"), a collaborationist, quasi-political-party organization in northern China under Japanese occupation.
	1938–1940	Flag of the Reformed Government of the Republic of China	
	1936–1939	Flag of the Mongol Military Government, which became the Flag of the Mongol United Autonomous Government in 1937	A vertical pattern of red, yellow, white as a canton on a blue field.
	1938–1939	Flag of the South Chahar Autonomous Government, also known as Chanan. Later merged with the Mongol United Autonomous Government and Jinbei to create Mengjiang	A vertical pattern of red, white, blue as a canton on a yellow field.
	1938–1939	Flag of the North Shanxi Autonomous Government, also known as Jinbei. Later merged with the Mongol United Autonomous Government and Chanan to create Mengjiang	A vertical pattern of red, blue, white as a canton on a yellow field.
	1939–1945	Flag of Mengjiang	A horizontal pattern of yellow, blue, white, red, white, blue, and yellow again.

== Foreign concessions and colonies ==
=== Dalian ===
Flag	Duration	Use	Description
	1905–1945	Flag of the Kwantung Leased Territory	Flag of Japan
	1898–1905	Flag of Russian Dalian	Flag of Russia

=== Tianjin ===
Flag	Duration	Use	Description
	1901–1917	Flag of the Austro-Hungarian concession of Tianjin	Flag of the Habsburg Monarchy
	1902–1931	Flag of the Belgian concession of Tianjin	Flag of Belgium
	1860–1943	Flag of the British concession of Tianjin	Union Jack
	1901–1943	Flag of the Italian concession of Tianjin	Flag of Italy
	1900–1924	Flag of the Russian concession of Tianjin	Flag of Russia

=== Chinese Eastern Railway ===
Flag	Duration	Use	Description
	1932–1935		A combination of the flag of Manchukuo at the top and the flag of Soviet Union at the bottom.
	1928–1932		A combination of the flag of the Republic of China at the top and the flag of Soviet Union at the bottom.
	1925–1928		A combination of the Five-Colored Flag at the top and the flag of Soviet Union at the bottom.
	1915–1925		A combination of a triangular version of the Five-Colored Flag in the lower hoist half, the flag of Russia in the upper fly quarter, and the text "East Provinces' Railway Company of China" in Chinese in the higher of the white triangles between the two designs.
	1897–1915		A combination of the triangular version of the flag of the Qing dynasty, the flag of Russia in the upper fly quarter, and the text "East Provinces' Railway of Great Qing" in Chinese in the higher of the white triangles between the two designs.

=== Qingdao ===
Flag	Duration	Use	Description
	1898–1914	Flag of the Kiautschou Bay Leased Territory	Flag of Germany (1867–1918)

=== Shanghai ===
Flag	Duration	Use	Description
	c. 1917–1941	Flag of the Shanghai Municipal Council	
	1863–c. 1917	Flag of the Shanghai Municipal Council	
	1849–1943	Flag of the Shanghai French Concession	Flag of France
	1845–1863	Flag of the British Concession in Shanghai	Union Jack
	1848–1863	Flag of the American Concession in Shanghai	Flag of the United States

=== Weihai ===
Flag	Duration	Use	Description
	1903–1930	Flag of British Weihaiwei	A British Blue Ensign with two Mandarin ducks standing on a beach.
	1899–1903	Flag of the Commissioner of Weihaiwei	
	1903–1930	Flag of the Commissioner of Weihaiwei	

=== Zhanjiang ===
Flag	Duration	Use	Description
	1898–1945	Flag of Guangzhouwan	Flag of France

== Former secessionist states ==
=== East Turkestan ===
Flag	Duration	Use	Description
	1945–1946	Flag of Second East Turkestan	

=== Tibet ===
Flag	Duration	Use	Description
		Flag of Chushi Gangdruk	Used by Chushi Gangdruk, a Tibetan guerrilla group, until 1974. The group still exists among the Tibetan exiles and still uses the sword emblem.
	1959–present	Flag of Tibet	Currently used by the Tibetan Government in Exile located in Dharamshala, India
	1916–1951	Flag of Tibet (1912–1951)	
	1951–1959	Flag of the General Derge Se for the Tibetan Army	

== Misattributed flags ==
This is a list of incorrect or fictitious flags which have been reported on as being factual and/or historical flags by contemporary or otherwise reputable sources or popularized on the Internet.

Flag	Date	Use	Description
Mistakes in historical sources
	19th century	Incorrect image of the Qing flag in the Western publication	The dragon bears a resemblance to the one on the Flag of Wales.
	20th century	Alleged pre-1912 Tibetan flag	Fictitious flag appearing on a collector card from a chocolate manufacturer featuring the palace of the Dalai Lama in Lhasa in the early 20th century. Identical to Chinese Merchant Group flag.
	1935–1938	Alleged flag of the East Hebei Autonomous Government	Erroneous flag appearing in a postcard published by Parliamentary Secretary Yin of the Jitong Defense Joint Self-Government in Hebei. The blue and yellow banners are switched due to erroneous coloring. Identical to Provincial Commander-in-Chief of Beiyang Fleet flag.
	1937	Alleged flag of the Mongol United Autonomous Government	Erroneous flag of the Mongol United Autonomous Government based on The Airpost Journal's description. It mentions "a square of horizontal red, yellow, white and black stripes".
Historical fiction
	7th century (de facto 1990s)	Alleged flag of the Tibetan Empire	A modern interpretation of an uncertain standard of the Tibetan Emperor, Songtsen Gampo.
	21st century	Flag allegedly representing the Tang dynasty on the internet. Similar flags are attributed to other dynasties.	
	21st century	Flags allegedly representing the Mongol Empire or Yuan dynasty on the internet.	A white Soyombo on a blue background.
	21st century	The "Sun Moon Flag", attributed to the Ming dynasty	Improperly used both on the internet and in real life.
	Another variant of the Ming dynasty flag		
	1931–1945 (Note: De facto used by Manchurian nationalists in Hong Kong, Japan, Taiwan in 21st century.)	Flag of the Concordia Association	Contains the Manchu text ᠰᡳᡝᡥᠣᡥᡠᡳ. The Manchu version has never been used.
	?	Alleged flag of the pirate Gan Ning	Various flags containing a bell are assigned to a pirate on the Internet.
	?	Alleged flag of the pirate Ching Shih	
Fictional ethnic flags
	2010	Flag of the Han dynasty, Han nationalism (contemporary) and Han Chinese (Note: Created by 华小桶 for the Han dynasty in 2010, and used by Han nationalist netizens from 2014 or 2015. This flag has also been used to represent the Han Dynasty in some historical reenactments.)	The loong symbol is from Qinglong Wadang manufactured in Han dynasty, collected in Xi'an museum.
	around 2010s	Flag of the Han dynasty, Han nationalism (contemporary) and Han Chinese	The loong symbol is from Qinglong Wadang manufactured in Han dynasty, collected in Xi'an museum.
	around 2012	Flag of the Zhuang people (Note: The project was created by Leonardo Piccioni de Almeida and gained some popularity among Internet users criticizing the PRC. PRC law prohibits the use of cultural flags. Some websites use this flag to represent the Zhuang language.)	
	around 2012	Flag of the Yi people (Note: The project was created by Leonardo Piccioni de Almeida and gained some popularity among Internet users criticizing the PRC. PRC law prohibits the use of cultural flags. Some websites use this flag to represent the Yi language.)	
	21st century	Flag of the Salar people (Note: Tamga of the Salur tribe is actually used, but there is no evidence that it is used as a flag. PRC law prohibits the use of cultural flags. Some websites use this flag to represent the Salar language.)	
Other
	?	Proposed tricolour flag for Chaoshan (East Cantonia), China	Used by autonomist activists.
	20th–21st century	Xiang separatist movement flag	Used by the Hunan independence movement.

In 2012, Vietnam mistakenly used a six-star flag for China (one big and five small stars) during the visit of the President of China.

== See also ==
- Flag of China
- Flag of the Republic of China
- Flag of the Qing dynasty
- List of Taiwanese flags
- Flag of East Turkestan
- List of Hong Kong flags
- List of Macanese flags
- Flag of Tibet
- Proposed flags of Taiwan
