= List of sovereign states in the 1930s =

Map of the World in 1931

This is a list of sovereign states in the 1930s, giving an overview of states around the world during the period between 1 January 1930 and 31 December 1939. It contains entries, arranged alphabetically, with information on the status and recognition of their sovereignty. It includes 77 widely recognized sovereign states, entities which were de facto sovereign but which were not widely recognized by other states, and 1 state which was initially unrecognized but then gained full recognition later in the decade.

== Sovereign states ==
Name and capital city	Information on status and recognition of sovereignty
=== A ===
→ Afghanistan – Kingdom of Afghanistan; Capital: Kabul	Widely recognized independent state. LON member state (from 27 September 1934).
→ Albania – Albanian Kingdom (to April 12, 1939); Capital: Tirana	Widely recognized LON member state. Under occupation by Italy from April 12, 1939.
→ Andorra – Principality of Andorra; Capital: Andorra la Vella	Widely recognized independent state.
Argentina – Argentine Republic; Capital: Buenos Aires	Widely recognized LON member state. Argentina was a federation of 15 provinces and 9 federal territories. (Note: 15 Provinces: Buenos Aires, Catamarca, Córdoba, Corrientes, Entre Ríos, Jujuy, La Pampa, La Rioja, Mendoza, Salta, San Juan, San Luis, Santa Fe, Santiago del Estero, Tucumán. 9 Territories: Buenos Aires, Chaco, Chubut, Formosa, Misiones, Neuquén, Río Negro, Santa Cruz, Tierra del Fuego.) It had a claim over Argentine Antarctica. It also claimed the Falkland Islands and South Georgia and the South Sandwich Islands, both of which were British crown colonies.
Aussa – Sultanate of Aussa (to 1936); Capital: Aussa	Widely recognized state. Annexed into Italian East Africa.
Australia – Commonwealth of Australia; Capital: Canberra	Widely-recognized de facto independent state. UN member state. British dominion and Commonwealth realm. Australia was a federation of six states and four territories. (Note: 6 States: New South Wales, Queensland, South Australia, Tasmania, Victoria, Western Australia. 4 Territories: Australian Capital Territory, Central Australia (until June 11, 1931), Jervis Bay Territory, Northern Territory.) It had sovereignty over the following external territories: Australian Antarctic Territory (from 1933); Norfolk Island; Papua; Australia administered two League of Nations mandates: Nauru (Administered by Australia, New Zealand and the United Kingdom); New Guinea
→ Austria (to March 12, 1938); Capital: Vienna: Republic of Austria (to May 1, 1934); Federal State of Austria (from May 1, 1934 to March 12, 1938)	Widely recognized LON member state. Annexed by Nazi Germany on March 12, 1938.
=== B ===
Belgium – Kingdom of Belgium; Capital: Brussels	Widely recognized LON member state. Belgium had sovereignty over one colony and one concession: Belgian Congo (Colony); Tientsin (Concession, to January 15, 1931); Belgium administered one League of Nations mandate: Ruanda-Urundi (Administrative union with the Belgian Congo)
Bolivia – Republic of Bolivia Capital: Sucre (official), La Paz (administrative)	Widely recognized independent state.
Brazil; Capital: Rio de Janeiro: First Brazilian Republic (to 3 November 1930); Vargas Era (from 3 November 1930 to 10 November 1937); Estado Novo (from 10 November 1937)	Widely recognized independent state. Brazil was a federation of 20 states, one territory, and one federal district. (Note: 20 States: Alagoas, Amazonas, Bahia, Ceará, Espírito Santo, Goiás, Maranhão, Mato Grosso, Minas Gerais, Pará, Paraíba, Paraná, Pernambuco, Piauí, Rio Grande do Norte, Rio Grande do Sul, Rio de Janeiro, Santa Catarina, São Paulo, Sergipe. 1 Territory: Acre. 1 federal district: Federal District.)
Bulgaria – Tsardom of Bulgaria; Capital: Sofia	Widely recognized LON member state.
=== C ===
Canada – Dominion of Canada; Capital: Ottawa	Widely recognized de facto independent state. De jure independent from 11 November, 1931 LON member state to 20 April 1946. UN member state from 9 November 1945. British Dominion and Commonwealth realm. Canada was a federation of nine provinces and two territories.
Chile; Capital: Santiago: Republic of Chile (to June 4, 1932); Socialist Republic of Chile (from June 4 to September 13, 1932); Republic of Chile (from September 13, 1932)	Widely recognized LON member state; withdrew on May 14, 1938.
China – Republic of China; Capital: Nanjing	Widely recognized LON member state.
Colombia – Republic of Colombia; Capital: Bogotá	Widely recognized LON member state.
Costa Rica – Republic of Costa Rica; Capital: San José	Widely recognized independent state.
Cuba – Republic of Cuba; Capital: Havana	Widely recognized LON member state.
Czechoslovakia (to 14 March 1939); Capital: Prague: Czechoslovak Republic (to 30 September 1938); Czecho-Slovak Republic (from 30 September 1938 to 14 March 1939)	Widely recognized LON member state. Under occupation by Nazi Germany from 15 May 1939. A government in exile was regarded as the legitimate government by the Allies.
=== D ===
Danzig – Free City of Danzig (to 12 September 1939); Capital: Danzig	Widely recognized independent state. Annexed by Germany from 12 September 1939.
Denmark – Kingdom of Denmark; Capital: Copenhagen	Widely recognized LON member state. Denmark had sovereignty over one possession: Greenland
Dominican Republic – Third Dominican Republic; Capital: Santo Domingo	Widely recognized LON member state.
=== E ===
Ecuador – Republic of Ecuador; Capital: Quito	Widely recognized independent state. LON member state from September 28, 1934.
(Kingdom of Egypt) Egypt – Kingdom of Egypt; Capital: Cairo	Widely recognized independent state. LON member state from May 26, 1937.
El Salvador – Republic of El Salvador; Capital: San Salvador	Widely recognized LON member state; withdrew on August 11, 1937.
Estonia – Republic of Estonia; Capital: Tallinn	Widely recognized LON member state.
Ethiopia – Ethiopian Empire (to 9 May 1936); Capital: Addis Ababa	Widely recognized LON member state. Under occupation by Italy from May 9, 1936, and annexed into Italian East Africa from June 1, 1936.
=== F ===
Finland – Republic of Finland; Capital: Helsinki	Widely recognized LON member state.
France – French Republic; Capital: Paris	Widely recognized LON member state. France administered the foreign affairs of the following colonies and protectorates: French Algeria (de jure Department of Metropolitan France, de facto Colony); French Equatorial Africa (Colony); French Guiana (Colony); French India – French Establishments in India (Colony); French Indochina (Federation of protectorates); French Madagascar (Colony); French Morocco (Protectorate); French Oceania – French Establishments in Oceania (Colony); French Somaliland (Colony); French Tunisia (Protectorate); French West Africa (Colony); Guadeloupe (Colony); Inini (Colony from June 6, 1930); Martinique (Colony); France administered the following League of Nations mandates: Alawite (to December 3, 1936); → Lebanese Republic; State of Syria (to May 14, 1930); → Syrian Republic (from May 14, 1930); Jabal ad-Druze (to September 9, 1936); French Cameroons; French Togoland; Saar Basin (Administered by the United Kingdom and France to March 1, 1935)
=== G ===
→ → Germany – German Reich; Capital: Berlin: Weimar Republic (to 23 March 1933); Nazi Germany (from 23 March 1933)	Widely recognized LON member state; withdrew on October 19, 1933.
→ (Kingdom of Greece) Greece; Capital: Athens: Hellenic Republic (to 3 November 1935); Kingdom of Greece (from 3 November 1935)	Widely recognized LON member state.
Guatemala – Republic of Guatemala; Capital: Guatemala City	Widely recognized LON member state; withdrew on May 26, 1936.
=== H ===
Haiti – Republic of Haiti; Capital: Port-au-Prince	Widely recognized LON member state under United States occupation to August 1, 1934.
→ Honduras – Republic of Honduras; Capital: Tegucigalpa	Widely recognized LON member state; withdrew on July 10, 1936.
Hungary – Kingdom of Hungary; Capital: Budapest	Widely recognized LON member state; withdrew on April 11, 1939.
=== I ===
Persia / Iran; Capital: Tehran: Imperial State of Persia (to 21 March 1935); Imperial State of Iran (from 21 March 1935)	Widely recognized LON member state.
Iraq – Hashemite Kingdom of Iraq (from 3 October 1932); Capital: Baghdad	Widely recognized independent state. LON member state from October 3, 1932.
Ireland; Capital: Dublin: Irish Free State (11 December 1931 to December 29 1937); Ireland (from December 29, 1937)	Widely recognized de facto independent state. De jure independent from December 11, 1931. British dominion, LON member state, Commonwealth realm.
Italy – Kingdom of Italy; Capital: Rome	Widely recognized LON member state under fascism; withdrew on December 11, 1937. Italy had sovereignty over two colonies (four colonies until January 1934 and three colonies until June 1936) and three concessions: (Kingdom of Italy) Amoy (Concession); Italian Cyrenaica (Colony, to 1 January 1934); Italian Tripolitania (Colony, to 1 January 1934); Italian Libya (Colony, from 1 January 1934); Italian Eritrea (Colony, to 1 June 1936); Italian Somaliland (Colony, to 1 June 1936); Italian East Africa (Colony, from 1 June 1936); (Kingdom of Italy) Shanghai (Concession); Tientsin (Concession)
=== J ===
Japan – Empire of Japan; Capital: Tokyo	Widely recognized LON member state; withdrew on March 27, 1933. Japan had sovereignty over the following dependencies and concessions: (Empire of Japan) Chongqing (Concession until 1937); (Empire of Japan) Hangzhou (Concession); (Empire of Japan) Hankou (Concession); Japanese Korea (Chōsen) (Note: Claimed by Provisional Government of the Republic of Korea (partially recognized government-in-exile).) (Dependency); Karafuto (Dependency); Kwantung (Concession); (Empire of Japan) Shashi (Concession); (Empire of Japan) Suzhou (Concession); Taiwan (Dependency); Tientsin (Concession); Japan administered one League of Nations mandate: South Seas Mandate
=== L ===
Latvia – Republic of Latvia; Capital: Riga	Widely recognized LON member state.
Liberia – Republic of Liberia; Capital: Monrovia	Widely recognized LON member state.
→ Liechtenstein – Principality of Liechtenstein; Capital: Vaduz	Widely recognized independent state.
Lithuania – Republic of Lithuania; Capital: Kaunas	Widely recognized LON member state.
Luxembourg – Grand Duchy of Luxembourg; Capital: Luxembourg City	Widely recognized LON member state.
=== M ===
→ Mexico – United Mexican States; Capital: Mexico City	Widely recognized independent state. LON member state from September 12, 1931; declared a member on September 12, 1931. Mexico had sovereignty over one territory: Isla de la Pasión (uninhabited territory, to January 28, 1931)
Monaco – Principality of Monaco; Capital: Monaco	Widely recognized independent state.
=== N ===
Najran – Principality of Najran (to 1934); Capital: Najran	Widely recognized independent state until 1934. Annexed by the Kingdom of Yemen in 1934.
→ → → Nejd and Hejaz – (personal union to 23 September 1932), Saudi Arabia (from September 23, 1932); Capital: Riyadh: Kingdom of Nejd and Hejaz (to September 23, 1932); → → Kingdom of Saudi Arabia (from September 23, 1932)	Widely recognized independent state. Nejd and Hejaz had sovereignty over one protectorate: Asir (to November 20, 1930)
(Nepal) → Nepal – Kingdom of Nepal; Capital: Kathmandu	Widely recognized independent state.
Netherlands – Kingdom of the Netherlands; Capital: Amsterdam	Widely recognized LON member state. The Netherlands had sovereignty over three colonies: Curaçao and Dependencies; Dutch East Indies; Surinam
(Dominion of Newfoundland) → (United Kingdom) Newfoundland – Dominion of Newfoundland (de facto to February 16, 1934); Capital: St. John's	Widely recognized de facto independent state until February 16, 1934. (Note: Following the commission of government in 1934, Newfoundland reverted back to being run like a crown colony, ending its de facto independent status.) British dominion and Commonwealth realm.
New Zealand – Dominion of New Zealand; Capital: Wellington	Widely recognized de facto independent state. LON member state, British dominion and Commonwealth realm. New Zealand had sovereignty over four dependent territories: Cook Islands (Dependent territory); Niue-Fekai (Dependent territory); Union Islands (Dependent territory); Ross Dependency (Uninhabited dependent territory); New Zealand administered one League of Nations mandate: Western Samoa
Nicaragua – Republic of Nicaragua; Capital: Managua	Widely recognized LON member state under United States occupation to 1933; withdrew on June 27, 1936.
Norway – Kingdom of Norway; Capital: Oslo	Widely recognized LON member state. Norway had sovereignty over three uninhabited possessions: Bouvet Island; Peter I Island (from March 6, 1931); Sverdrup Islands (to November 11, 1930)
=== P ===
Panama – Republic of Panama; Capital: Panama City	Widely recognized LON member state.
Paraguay – Republic of Paraguay; Capital: Asunción	Widely recognized LON member state; withdrew on February 23, 1935.
Peru – Peruvian Republic; Capital: Lima	Widely recognized LON member state; withdrew on April 8, 1939.
Poland – Republic of Poland (to 6 October 1939); Capital: Warsaw	Widely recognized LON member state. Under occupation by Nazi Germany from 6 October 1939. A government in exile was regarded as the legitimate government by the Allies.
Portugal – Portuguese Republic; Capital: Lisbon	Widely recognized LON member state. The following were colonies and possession of Portugal: Portuguese Cape Verde (Colony); Portuguese Macau (Colony); Portuguese East Africa (Colony); Portuguese Guinea (Colony); Portuguese India (Colony); Portuguese Timor (Colony); Portuguese West Africa (Colony); Fort of São João Baptista de Ajudá (Possession); Portuguese São Tomé and Príncipe (Colony)
=== R ===
Romania – Kingdom of Romania; Capital: Bucharest	Widely recognized LON member state.
=== S ===
San Marino – Most Serene Republic of San Marino; Capital: San Marino	Widely recognized independent state.
Siam / Thailand; Capital: Bangkok: Kingdom of Siam (to 23 June 1939); Kingdom of Thailand (from 23 June 1939)	Widely recognized LON member state.
South Africa – Union of South Africa; Capital: Pretoria (administrative), Cape Town (legislative), Pietermaritzburg (archival), Bloemfontein (judicial)	Widely recognized de facto independent state. De jure independent from December 11, 1931. LON member state; British dominion and Commonwealth realm. South Africa administered one League of Nations mandate: South West Africa
→ Soviet Union – Union of Soviet Socialist Republics; Capital: Moscow	Widely recognized independent state. LON member state from September 18, 1934; expelled on December 14, 1939. The Soviet Union was a federation of seven (later 11) republics. (Note: Byelorussian SSR, Russian SFSR, Transcaucasian SFSR (to December 5, 1936), Ukrainian SSR, Uzbek SSR, Turkmen SSR, Tajik SSR, Armenian SSR (from December 5, 1936), Azerbaijan SSR (from December 5, 1936), Georgian SSR (from December 5, 1936), Kazakh SSR (from December 5, 1936), Kirghiz SSR (from December 5, 1936).)
→ → (Francoist Spain) Spain; Capital: Madrid (1930–1936), Valencia (1936–1937), Barcelona (1937–1939): Kingdom of Spain (to 14 April 1931); Spanish Republic (from 14 April 1931 to 1 April 1939); Spanish State (from 1 April 1939)	Widely recognized LON member state; withdrew on May 9, 1939. Spain had sovereignty over the following colonies and protectorate: → Ifni (Colony from January 12, 1934); → → Spanish Guinea (Colony); → → Spanish Sahara (Colony); Spanish Morocco (Protectorate)
Sweden – Kingdom of Sweden; Capital: Stockholm	Widely recognized LON member state.
Switzerland; Capital: Bern: Swiss Confederation (to 1 September 1939); Swiss Confederation (from 1 September 1939)	Widely recognized LON member state.
=== T ===
(Ottoman Empire) → Turkey – Republic of Turkey; Capital: Ankara	Widely recognized independent state. LON member state from July 18, 1932.
=== U ===
United Kingdom – United Kingdom of Great Britain and Northern Ireland; Capital: London	Widely recognized LON member state; Commonwealth realm. The United Kingdom was made up of 4 constituent countries, England, Northern Ireland, Scotland and Wales. The United Kingdom had sovereignty over the following colonies, territories and protectorates: Aden – Aden Colony and Protectorate (Crown colony from 1937 and protectorate); (United Kingdom) Amoy (Concession until 1930); Anglo-Egyptian Sudan (Condominium of the United Kingdom and the Kingdom of Egypt); Ashanti (Protectorate); Bahama Islands (Crown colony); → Bahrain – State of Bahrain (Protectorate); Baker Island (Uninhabited possession); Barbados (Crown colony); Basutoland – Territory of Basutoland (Crown colony); Bechuanaland – Bechuanaland Protectorate (Protectorate); Bermuda (Crown colony); Bhutan – Kingdom of Bhutan (Independent state under Treaty of Punakha); British Guiana (Crown colony); British Honduras (Crown colony); British Leeward Islands – Federal Colony of the Leeward Islands (Crown colony); British Somaliland – British Somaliland Protectorate (Protectorate); British Solomon Islands Protectorate; British Windward Islands – Federal Colony of the Windward Islands (Crown colony); Brunei – State of Brunei (Protectorate); (United Kingdom) → (British rule in Burma) Burma (Crown colony from April 1, 1937); Canton and Enderbury Islands (Condominium of the United Kingdom and the United States from April 6, 1939); (Dominion of Ceylon) Ceylon (Crown colony); Cyprus (Crown colony); Enderby Land (Uninhabited possession, from January 13, 1930 to June 13, 1933); Falkland Islands (Crown colony); Federated Malay States (Protectorate); Gambia – Gambia Colony and Protectorate (Crown colony and protectorate); → Gibraltar (Crown colony); Gilbert and Ellice Islands Colony; Gold Coast (Crown colony); Heard Island and McDonald Islands (Uninhabited possession); Hong Kong (Crown colony); India – Indian Empire (Crown colony); Jamaica (Crown colony); Jarvis Island (Uninhabited possession); Johor – State of Johor Darul Ta'zim (Protectorate); Kedah – State of Kedah Darul Aman (Protectorate); Kelantan – State of Kelantan Darul Naim (Protectorate); Kenya – Kenya Colony and Protectorate (Crown colony and protectorate); Kuwait – Sheikhdom of Kuwait (Protectorate); Maldive Islands – Sultanate of the Maldive Islands (Protectorate); Malta (Crown colony); Mauritius (Crown colony); Muscat and Oman – Sultanate of Muscat and Oman (State under the informal protection); Dominion of Newfoundland From 16 February, 1934 (Note: Following the commission of government in 1934, Newfoundland reverted back to being run like a crown colony, ending its de facto independent status.); Nigeria – Colony and Protectorate of Nigeria (Crown colony and protectorate); North Borneo (Protectorate); Northern Rhodesia – Protectorate of Northern Rhodesia (Protectorate); Northern Territories of the Gold Coast (Protectorate); Nyasaland – Nyasaland Protectorate (Protectorate); Perlis – State of Perlis Indera Kayangan (Protectorate); (United Kingdom) Pitcairn Island (Possession); → → Qatar – State of Qatar (Protectorate); (United Kingdom) Redonda (Possession); Saint Helena (Crown colony); Sarawak – Kingdom of Sarawak (Protectorate); Seychelles (Crown colony); Sierra Leone – Sierra Leone Colony and Protectorate (Crown colony and protectorate); Sikkim (Independent state under the Treaty of Tumlong); (United Kingdom) South Orkney Islands (Uninhabited possession); Southern Rhodesia – Colony of Southern Rhodesia (Crown colony); (United Kingdom) South Shetland Islands (Uninhabited possession); Straits Settlements (Crown colony); (United Kingdom) Suez Canal Zone (Crown colony); Swaziland – Swaziland Protectorate (Protectorate); → Terengganu – State of Terengganu Darul Iman (Protectorate); (United Kingdom) Tientsin (Concession); Trinidad and Tobago (Crown colony); Tristan da Cunha (Crown colony); Trucial States (Protectorate); Uganda (Protectorate); Victoria Land (Uninhabited possession); Weihaiwei (Concession, to October 1, 1930); Zanzibar (Protectorate); United Kingdom administered the following League of Nations mandates: British Cameroons; British Togoland; Iraq (to October 3, 1932); Palestine; → Transjordan; Saar Basin (Administered by the United Kingdom and France to March 1, 1935); Tanganyika; The British Crown (but not the UK) had sovereignty over the following crown dependencies: → Guernsey – Bailiwick of Guernsey, with two dependencies: Alderney; → Sark; Jersey – Bailiwick of Jersey; → Isle of Man
United States – United States of America; Capital: Washington, D.C.	Widely recognized independent state. The United States had sovereignty over 21 territories: Alaska – Alaska Territory (Territory); American Samoa – Territory of American Samoa (Territory); Canton and Enderbury Islands (Condominium of the United Kingdom and the United States from April 6, 1939); Corn Islands (Territory); Guam – Territory of Guam (Territory); Hawaii – Territory of Hawaii (Territory); Howland Island (Uninhabited territory); Johnston Atoll (Uninhabited territory); Kingman Reef (Uninhabited territory); Midway Atoll (Uninhabited territory); Navassa Island (Uninhabited territory); Panama Canal Zone (Territory); Petrel Islands (Uninhabited territory); Philippine Islands (Territory to November 15, 1935 to be reorganized as a commonwealth and an unincorporated territory); Puerto Rico (Territory); Quita Sueno Bank (Uninhabited territory); Roncador Bank (Uninhabited territory); Serrana Bank (Uninhabited territory); Serranilla Bank (Uninhabited territory); Swan Islands (Uninhabited territory); United States Virgin Islands (Territory); Wake Island (Uninhabited territory)
Uruguay – Eastern Republic of Uruguay; Capital: Montevideo	Widely recognized LON member state.
=== V ===
Vatican City – Vatican City State; Capital: Vatican City	Widely recognized independent state.
→ Venezuela – United States of Venezuela; Capital: Caracas	Widely recognized LON member state; withdrew on July 12, 1938.
=== Y ===
Yemen – Mutawakkilite Kingdom of Yemen; Capital: Sana'a	Widely recognized independent state.
Yugoslavia – Kingdom of Yugoslavia; Capital: Belgrade	Widely recognized independent state.
== Other entities == Excluded from the list above are the following noteworthy entities which either were not fully sovereign or did not claim to be independent:
Ararat – Republic of Ararat (to September 17, 1930); Capital: Kurdava	Unrecognized state.
Asch – Free City of Asch (from September 22, 1938 to October 1938); Capital: Asch	Unrecognized state.
Asturias and León – Sovereign Council of Asturias and León (from September 6, 1936 to October 21, 1937); Capital: Gijón	Unrecognized state.
Brazil, Socialist Republic of – Socialist Republic of Brazil (November 23 to 27, 1935); Capital: Rio de Janeiro	Unrecognized state. Claimed by Brazil after four days.
Carpatho-Ukraine (from 30 December 1938 to 15 March 1939); Capital: Khust	Unrecognized state. Occupied by Hungary on March 15, 1939.
Catalonia (from 14 to 17 April 1931 and from 6 to 7 October 1934); Capital: Barcelona: Catalan Republic (from 14 to 17 April 1931); Catalan State (from 6 to 7 October 1934)	Self-declared state in 1931; became an autonomous government within the Spanish Republic, named Generalitat of Catalonia, from April 17, 1931. Self-declared revolutionary state in 1934 during the Events of 6 October.
China, Provisional Government of – Provisional Government of the Republic of China (from December 14, 1937); Capital: Beiping	Unrecognized state. Puppet state of Japan.
China, Reformed Government of – Reformed Government of the Republic of China (from March 28, 1938); Capital: Nanjing	Unrecognized state. Puppet state of Japan.
China, Soviet Republic of – Chinese Soviet Republic (from November 7, 1931 to September 22, 1937); Capital: Ruijin (1931–1936), Bao'an (1936–1937), Yan'an (1937)	Unrecognized state.
Democratic Finland – Finnish Democratic Republic (from December 1, 1939); Capital: Helsinki (official), Terijoki (de facto)	Partially recognized socialist republic. Puppet state of the Soviet Union.
East Hebei – East Hebei Autonomous Council (from November 25, 1935 to February 1, 1938); Capital: Tungchow	Unrecognized state. Puppet state of Japan.
East Turkestan – Turkish Islamic Republic of East Turkestan (from November 12, 1933 to February 6, 1934); Capital: Kashgar	De facto unrecognized independent state. De jure regional province of China.
Fujian People's Government (from November 22, 1933 to January 13, 1934); Capital: Fuzhou, Zhangzhou	Unrecognized state. Annexed by China on January 13, 1934.
Hatay – Hatay State (from 7 September 1938 to 7 July 1939); Capital: Antakya	Transitional political state. Annexed by Turkey from 7 July 1939.
Iceland – Kingdom of Iceland; Capital: Reykjavík	Semi-independent associated state in personal union with Denmark.
Jiangxi – Chinese Soviet Republic (from November 7, 1931 to September 22, 1937); Capital: Ruijin (1931–1936), Bao'an (1936–1937), Yan'an (1937)	Unrecognized state.
Korea, Provisional Government of – Provisional Government of the Republic of Korea; Capital-in-exile: Shanghai (to 1932), Hangzhou (1932–1935), Jiaxing (1935), Nanjing (1935–1937), Changsha (1937–1938), Canton (1938–1939), Qijiang (from 1939)	Unrecognized government-in-exile.
Manchukuo (from February 18, 1932); Capital: Xinjing	Puppet state of Japan recognized by several neutral states.
Mengjiang – Mengjiang United Autonomous Government (from September 1, 1939); Capital: Kalgan	Puppet state of Japan.
Mongolia – Mongolian People's Republic; Capital: Ulaanbaatar	Satellite state of the Soviet Union.
Mongol Union (from May 12, 1936 to September 1, 1939); Capital: Hohhot: Mongol Military Government (from May 12, 1936 to October 27, 1937); Mongol United Autonomous Government (from October 27, 1937 to September 1, 1939)	Puppet state of Japan. Became part of Mengjiang from September 1, 1939.
Muscat and Oman – Sultanate of Muscat and Oman; Capital: Muscat	De jure independent state. De facto a British protectorate.
North Shanxi – North Shanxi Autonomous Government (from October 15, 1937 to September 1, 1939); Capital: Datong	Puppet state of Japan. Became part of Mengjiang from September 1, 1939.
Northwest Soviet Federation – Northwestern Federation of the Chinese Soviet Republic (from May 30, 1935 to July 1, 1936); Capital: Mao County (to 1935), Barkam (to 1935), Jinchuan County (to 1935), Garzê County (from 1935 to 1936)	Unrecognized state. A confederation of two ethnic minority governments including the Revolutionary Government of the Republic of Geledesha and the Tibetan People's Republic.
Oman – Imamate State of Oman; Capital: Nizwa	Unrecognized state.
Princesa – Free Territory of Princesa (from 28 February to 11 August 1930); Capital: Princesa Isabel	Unrecognized state from 28 February to 11 August 1930. Annexed by Brazil on 11 August 1930.
Shanghai – Great Way Municipal Government of Shanghai (from December 5, 1937 to May 3, 1938); Capital: Pudong	Puppet government of Japan.
Slovakia – Slovak Republic (from March 14, 1939); Capital: Bratislava	Puppet state of Nazi Germany recognized by several neutral states.
South Chahar – South Chahar Autonomous Government (from September 4, 1937 to September 1, 1939); Capital: Kalgan	Puppet state of Japan. Became part of Mengjiang from September 1, 1939.
→ → → Tannu Tuva – Tuvan People's Republic; Capital: Khem-Beldyr (renamed Kyzyl in 1926)	Partially recognized socialist republic. Satellite state of the Soviet Union.
Tibet; Capital: Lhasa	Laregely unrecognized de facto independent state. Claimed by the Republic of China.
Western Oromia – Western Galla Confederation (to 1936); Capital: Gore	Unrecognized state.Rump Oromo state in western Ethiopia.

== See also ==
- List of sovereign states by year
- List of state leaders in 1930
- List of state leaders in 1931
- List of state leaders in 1932
- List of state leaders in 1933
- List of state leaders in 1934
- List of state leaders in 1935
- List of state leaders in 1936
- List of state leaders in 1937
- List of state leaders in 1938
- List of state leaders in 1939
