= List of territories acquired by the Empire of Japan =

Members of the Greater East Asia Co-Prosperity Sphere; territory controlled at maximum height. Japan and its allies in dark red; Thailand. Occupied territories/client states in lighter red. Korea, Taiwan, and Karafuto (South Sakhalin) were integral parts of Japan.

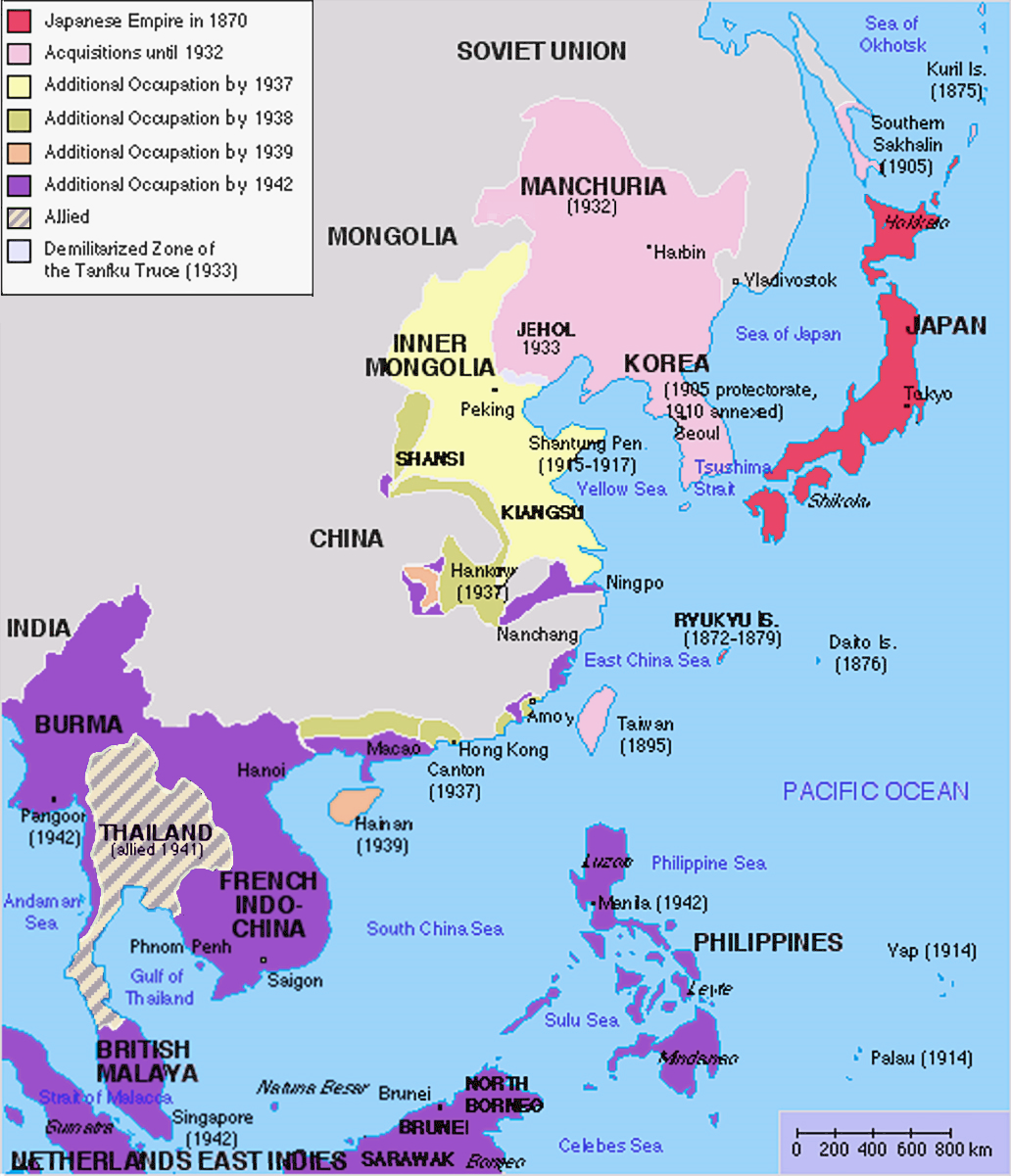
Maximum extent of the Japanese empire

This is a list of regions occupied or annexed by the Empire of Japan until 1945, the year of the end of World War II in Asia, after the surrender of Japan. Control over all territories except most of the Japanese mainland (Hokkaido, Honshu, Kyushu, Shikoku, and some 6,000 small surrounding islands) was renounced by Japan in the unconditional surrender after World War II and the Treaty of San Francisco. A number of territories occupied by the United States after 1945 were returned to Japan, but there are still a number of disputed territories between Japan and Russia (the Kuril Islands dispute), South Korea and North Korea (the Liancourt Rocks dispute), the People's Republic of China and Taiwan (the Senkaku Islands dispute).

== Summary ==
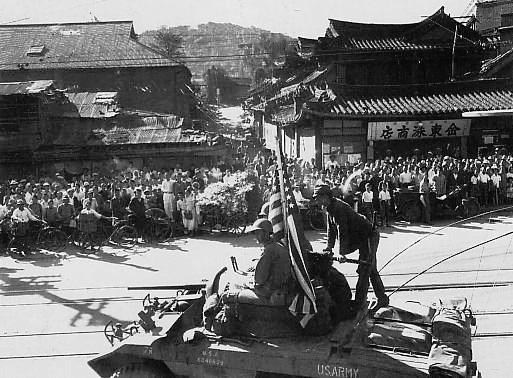
U.S. troops in Korea, September 1945

Before World War I, Japan had gained several substantial colonial possessions in East Asia such as Taiwan (1895) and Korea (1910). Japan joined the allies in World War I, and after the war acquired the South Seas Mandate, the former German colony in Micronesia, as a League of Nations Mandate. Pursuing a colonial policy comparable to those of European powers, Japan settled significant populations of ethnic Japanese in its colonies while simultaneously suppressing Indigenous ethnic populations by enforcing the learning and use of the Japanese language in schools. Other methods such as public interaction, and attempts to eradicate the use of Korean, Hokkien, and Hakka among the Indigenous peoples, were seen to be used. Japan also set up the Imperial Universities in Korea (Keijō Imperial University) and Taiwan (Taihoku Imperial University) to compel education.

In 1931, Japan seized Manchuria from the Republic of China, setting up a puppet state under Puyi, the last Manchu emperor of China. In 1933 Japan seized the Chinese province of Rehe, and incorporated it into its Manchurian possessions. The Second Sino-Japanese War started in 1937, and Japan occupied much of eastern China, including the Republic's capital at Nanjing. An estimated 20 million Chinese died during the 1931–1945 war with Japan.

In December 1941, the empire of Japan joined World War II by invading the European and U.S. colonies in Southeast Asia and the Pacific, including French Indochina, Hong Kong, the Philippines, Burma, Malaya, Indonesia, Portuguese Timor, and others. Following its surrender to the Allies in 1945, Japan was deprived of all its colonies with a number of them being returned to the original colonizing Western powers. The Soviet Union declared war on Japan in August 1945, and shortly after occupied and annexed the southern Kuril Islands, which Japan still claims.

== Meiji era ==
=== Colonies ===
- Ryūkyū Kingdom – 1872
- Taiwan and the Penghu Islands – 1895–1945
- Karafuto – 1905–1943 (incorporated between 1943–1945)
- Kantō – 1905–1945
- Chōsen – 1910–1945

=== Occupied territories ===
- Japanese occupation of Gyeongbokgung – 1894
- Occupation of Peking – 1900

== WWI and the Siberian Intervention ==
=== Colonies ===
- South Seas Mandate 1919–1945

=== Occupied territories ===
- Japanese Occupation of Tsingtao/Qingdao
- All ports and major towns in the Primorsky Krai and Siberia regions of Russia east of the city of Chita, from 1918 until gradually withdrawing in 1922.
- North Sakhalin was occupied by Japan 1920–1925.
- Japanese occupation of German colonial possessions
  - Japanese occupation of Mariana Islands, Marshall Islands, Palau Islands, Caroline Islands
- Occupation of Istanbul 1918–1923.
- Allied occupation of German New Guinea
- Japanese occupation of Vladivostok

== Invasion of Manchuria, Second-Sino Japanese War and World War II ==
=== Occupied territories and puppet regimes ===
- Manchukuo
- East Hebei Autonomous Government
- North Shanxi Autonomous Government
- South Chahar Autonomous Government
- Mengjiang United Autonomous Government
- Shanghai Great Way Government
- Provisional Government of China
- Reformed Government of China
- Reorganized National Government of China
- Kingdom of Thailand
- State of Burma
- Provisional Government of Free India
- Republic of the Philippines
- French Indochina
- Empire of Vietnam
- Kingdom of Kampuchea
- Kingdom of Luang Prabang
- Occupied Dutch East Indies
- Occupied West Sumatra
- Occupied Malaya
- Occupied British Borneo
- Occupied Hong Kong
- Occupied Singapore
- Occupied Guam
- Occupied Nauru
- Occupied Gilbert Islands
- Occupied Solomon Islands
- Occupied New Guinea
- Greater East Asia Co-Prosperity Sphere
- Greater East Asia Conference

=== Post-war successor states ===
- Manchuria (Manchukuo), Northern China (1945/1946)
- Philippines (1945/1946)
- Burma (1945/1948)
- North Korea (1945/1948)
- South Korea (1945/1948)
- Taiwan (1945/1949)
- Malaysia (1963)
- Singapore (1965)
- Indonesia (1945/1949)
- Netherlands New Guinea (1962)

=== Table of occupied territories ===
Japan Territory	Date	Notes
South Sakhalin	1905–1943	Elevated to naichi status in 1943.
Mainland China	1931–1945	Manchukuo 50 million (1940), Rehe, Kwantung Leased Territory, Jiangsu, Shanghai, Shandong, Hebei, Beijing, Tianjin, plus parts of : Guangdong, Guangxi, Hubei, Hunan, Fujian, Guizhou, Inner Mongolia
Japan proper	1868–1945	Present day Japan, South Sakhalin (after 1943), and Kuril Islands
Korea	1910–1945	
Taiwan	1895–1945	
Hong Kong	December 25, 1941 – August 30, 1945	Hong Kong (UK)
:: East Asia (subtotal)	–	
Vietnam	September 1940 – August 1945	As French Indochina (FR)
Cambodia	July 1941 - August 1945	As French Indochina, Japanese occupation of Cambodia
Laos	July 1941 - August 1945	As French Indochina, Japanese occupation of Laos
Thailand	December 8, 1941 – August 15, 1945	Independent state but allied with Japan
Malaysia	December 8, 1941 – September 12, 1945 (Malaya), December 16, 1941 – September 11, 1945 (Sarawak, Brunei, Labuan, North Borneo)	As Malaya (UK), British Borneo (UK), Brunei (UK)
Philippines	May 8, 1942 – September 2, 1945	Philippines (US)
Dutch East Indies	1942 – 1945	Dutch East Indies (NL), West Coast Sumatra (NL)
Singapore	February 15, 1942 – September 12, 1945	Singapore (UK)
Burma (Myanmar)	May 28, 1942–September 13, 1945	Burma (Myanmar) (UK)
East Timor	February 19, 1942 – September 11, 1945	Portuguese Timor (PT)
:: Southeast Asia (subtotal)	–	
Manipur	October 21, 1943 – August 18, 1945	Azad Hind (also independent but Japanese-allied)
:: South Asia (subtotal)	-	
New Guinea	1941 - 1945	As Papua and New Guinea (AU)
Guam	December 10, 1941 – August 10, 1944	from Guam (US)
South Seas Mandate	1919–1945	from German Empire
Nauru	August 26, 1942 – September 13, 1945	Occupied from the United Kingdom, Australia, and New Zealand
Wake Island, US	December 23, 1941 – September 4, 1945	US
Kiribati	December 1941 – 1945	from Gilbert Islands (UK)
:: Pacific Islands (subtotal)	–	

Disclaimer: Not all areas were considered part of Imperial Japan but rather part of puppet states & sphere of influence, allies, included separately for demographic purposes. Sources: POPULSTAT Asia Oceania

=== Other occupied islands during World War II ===
- Andaman Islands (India) – March 1942 - October 7, 1945
- Christmas Island (Australia) – March 1942 – October 1945
- Attu and Kiska (Alaska, United States) – June 3, 1942 – August 15, 1943

=== Areas attacked but not conquered ===
- Kohima (India)
- Dornod (Khalkhin Gol, Mongolia)
- Midway Atoll (United States)

=== Raided without immediate intent of occupation ===
- Air raids
  - Pearl Harbor (Hawaii, United States)
  - Colombo and Trincomalee (Sri Lanka)
  - Calcutta (India)
  - Chittagong (Bangladesh)
  - Air raids on Australia, including:
    - Broome (Western Australia, Australia)
    - Darwin (Northern Territory, Australia)
    - Townsville (Queensland, Australia)
  - Dutch Harbor (Alaska, United States)
  - Lookout Air Raids (Oregon, United States)
- Naval bombardment by submarine
  - British Columbia (Canada)
  - Ellwood (Santa Barbara, California, United States)
  - Fort Stevens (Oregon, United States)
  - Newcastle (New South Wales, Australia)
  - Gregory (Western Australia, Australia)
- Midget sub attack
  - Sydney (New South Wales, Australia)
  - Diego Suarez (Madagascar)

== Puppet regimes ==
The Empire of Japan had been creating puppet states in China since 1932 after the Mukden incident.

A. Puppet states in Asia created before the start of World War II in Europe

=== Northeast Supreme Administrative Council – February 16, 1932 to March 1, 1932 ===
On February 16, 1932, the Imperial Army hosted the "Founding Conference" or the "Big Four Conference" with governor of Liaoning, Zang Shiyi, commander of the Kirin Provincial Army, Xi Qia, Heilongjiang governor, Zhang Jinghui, and general Ma Zhanshan to establish the Northeast Administrative Committee. On its second meeting, the committee appointed the previous four and Tang Yulin, Ling Sheng, and Qimote Semupilei as chairmen. On the 18th, the Council issued a statement announcing that "the Northeast provinces are completely independent", all territories of which were in the hands of the council.

=== State of Manchuria – March 1, 1932 to August 18, 1945 ===
- (Chinese: 滿洲國, Japanese: 満州国)

Manchukuo

Manchuria had long been a location of unrest, and the Mukden Incident was a perfect excuse for Japanese occupation. In the Mukden incident, the Kwantung Army set off a bomb along the South Manchuria Railway and used the explosion as an excuse to occupy Manchuria, blaming Chinese forces. Manchukuo was created in March 1932. Although the Japanese controlled the area, they could not annex Manchuria into Japan because they had signed the Nine-Power Treaty. Japan and Manchukuo signed several treaties allowing Japan to mobilize Manchuria's people and resources as it liked. It was disestablished after the Soviet invasion of Manchuria.

=== East Hebei Autonomous Government – November 25, 1935 to February 1, 1938 ===
- (Japanese: 冀東防共自治政府)

East Hebei

The East Hebei Autonomous Council, also sometimes called the East Ji Autonomous Council or the East Hopei Autonomous Anti-Communist Council, was headed by Yin Ju-keng in 1935 to help protect economic interests in north China. East Hebei protected Japan's economic interests by prohibiting the export of silver and the circulation of the notes of the Central Bank of China. They also set up their own Central Bank and began to issue notes which were supported by several banks and were widely circulated in Tianjin, against the orders of the Chinese central government. Under Japan's control of East Hebei, the region broke into reported "lawlessness", with the puppet state purportedly selling drugs to raise money. On February 1, 1938, East Hebei was merged with the Provisional Government of the Republic of China.

=== Mengjiang United Autonomous Government – September 1, 1939 to August 19, 1945 ===
- (Chinese: 蒙疆聯合自治政府, Japanese: 蒙疆聯合自治政府)

Mengjiang

On 22 December 1935, part of Inner Mongolia split from China, and became an independent state. The Mongol Military Government was formed on 12 May 1936. The military government operated under Chinese sovereignty, but Japanese control. In 1937, its name was changed to the Mongol United Autonomous Government. In 1939, the United Mongolian Autonomous Government, the Northern Shanxi Autonomous Government, and the South Chahar Autonomous Government merged to become Mengjiang. Mengjiang was later merged with other puppet states to create the Provisional Government of the Republic of China.

=== Great Way Government – December 5, 1937 to May 3, 1938 ===
- (Chinese: 上海市大道政府, Japanese: 上海市大道政府)

Shanghai

The Great Way Municipal Government (GWMG) was created to help administer the occupied suburbs of Shanghai in December 1937. The GWMG was very small, headquartered in an office building in Pudong. Because of its association with the Japanese government, the GWMG found it hard to attract any politicians of reputation. It had difficulty creating an administration for Shanghai, and after just under five months merged with a new occupation regime in Nanjing.

=== Provisional Government of the Republic of China – December 14, 1937 to March 30, 1940 ===
- (Chinese: 中華民國臨時政府, Japanese: 中華民国臨時政府)

Provisional Government of ROC

The Provisional Government was set up just over six months after the Marco Polo Bridge incident, on the day after the fall of Nanking. Before the country was even created, in October 1937, Japan created the North China Development Company to exploit China's resource-rich north. On 30 March 1940, the Provisional Government was merged with other puppet states to form the Reorganized National Government of China.

=== Reformed Government of the Republic of China – March 28, 1938 to March 30, 1940 ===
- (Chinese: 中華民國維新政府, Japanese: 中華民国維新政府)

Reformed Government of ROC

The Reformed Government of the Republic of China (RGRC) was created in Nanking, after the Battle of Nanking on 28 March 1938. The RGRC was intended to appear legitimate. Wang Jingwei was the first Chairman of the RGRC. Despite this, the government was filled with "nonentities who posed no threat to the Japanese exercise of real power." It was merged into the Reorganized National Government of China in 1940.

B. Puppet states created after September 1939

=== Reorganized National Government of China – March 30, 1940 to August 16, 1945 ===
- (Chinese: 中華民國, Japanese: 中華民国)

Wang Jingwei's ROC

Japan wanted to make Wang Jingwei, the former leader of the Provisional Government of China, the leader of a new puppet government. He set up a new Nationalist government and requested that the Three Principles be reinstated, among other things. The Japanese initially denied this request, viewing the Three Principles as "Western ideas," but eventually accepted, with some exceptions: the requested five-branch system was replaced with a one-party system. The Nationalist Government retained independence in financial matters and the economy, but Japan controlled its politics. Despite this, the country had no real power, and was mainly used as a propaganda tool. The country was disestablished in August 1945.

=== State of Burma – August 1, 1943 to August 19, 1945 ===
- (Burmese: ဗမာ, Japanese: ビルマ国)

Burma

Initially, Burma was invaded with the sole objectives of cutting off the Burma Road, a route through which the United States and Great Britain supplied Chiang Kai-shek, and gaining the resources of Burma, mainly rice and gas. After Japan's successful conquest of Burma, which was completed in May 1942, they began driving the British out, using the Burmese Independence Army. Once the British were entirely out of Burma, Burma was granted nominal independence, which essentially meant that Burma was called independent, but was really under Japanese control, as part of the Greater East Asia Co-Prosperity Sphere. After several years, growing dissent in the country led to growing popularity of Thakins and other anti-government groups like it. By 1944, they had organized an underground anti-fascist organization, and on 27 March 1945, Aung San led these and other forces to rise up against the Japanese. The uprising is remembered as a struggle against "imperialist British" and "fascist Japanese."

=== Second Philippine Republic – October 14, 1943 to August 17, 1945 ===
- (Filipino: Repúbliká ng Pilipinas, Japanese: フィリピン第二共和国)

[Second] Republic of the Philippines

Following Japan's invasion of the Philippines in 1941, the Japanese tried to present themselves as liberators of the Philippines from their "colonial repression." In 1942, a group of influential Filipino politicians tried to negotiate with the Japanese for the creation of a new national government, but this led to nothing more than the creation of the puppet state. A second factor in the creation of the puppet state was the turning tide of the war: the Japanese believed that the creation of a government that appeared free would boost civilian morale. On 20 October 1944, US forces began the liberation of the Philippines. The Philippines were effectively under United States control by July 1945, and the Philippines was granted full independence in July 1946.

=== Provisional Government of Free India – October 21, 1943 to September 06, 1945 ===
- (Hindi: आर्ज़ी हुक़ूमत-ए-आजा़द हिन्द, Urdu: عارضی حکومت‌ِ آزاد ہند, Japanese: 自由インド仮政府, Bengali: আজাদ হিন্দ অস্থায়ী সরকার)

India

The Provisional Government of India, sometimes also called the Provisional Government of Azad Hind, was created by Indian nationalists-in-exile in October 1943. According to Subhas Chandra Bose in a proclamation issued on 4 April 1944, the government was formed in Syonan-to (formerly Singapore) after an invasion of Singapore. This invasion was wanted "by the unanimous will of the three million Indians in East Asia." Additionally, he stated that the Provisional Government had but one mission: "to expel the Anglo-American armies from the sacred soil of India by armed force and then to bring about the establishment of a Permanent Government of Azad Hind, in accordance with the will of the Indian people." He also claimed that "the Indian people will co-operate wholeheartedly with our Ally, the Nippon Army, who are giving us unstinted and unconditional assistance in defeating our enemies." Bose was also "fully convinced [of] Nippon's sincerity towards India." He also claimed that, given the Government's rapid advance into India, "the circumstances have... rendered it necessary... to borrow from the Nipponese Government the currency... already in its possession and to use that money as a temporary measure." The Provisional Government ended shortly after Subhas Bose died in a plane crash on the way to Taiwan, in August 1945. With his death, much of the Indian National Army surrendered. They got control of the Nicobar islands from them and manipur on the mainland

=== Empire of Vietnam – March 11, 1945 to August 25, 1945 ===
- (Vietnamese: Đế quốc Việt Nam, Japanese: ベトナム帝国)

Vietnam

On 10 May 1940, Germany began its invasion of France. Following victory over France on 22 June 1940, Philippe Pétain was given control of Vichy France. Japan had been placing pressure for facilities and bases in Vietnam before France fell, and the fall of France made Japan even more eager. Japan occupied Vietnam for much of World War II, and this set up a climate favorable to more radical ideas and revolutionary nationalism. Starting in the spring of 1945, the Viet Minh began carving out a small "liberated zone" along the borderlands of Vietnam. In an effort to save downed American pilots lost in Vietnam, the US agreed to aid the Viet Minh army, and train their technicians. After the first revolution, on 9 March 1945, the French governor of Indochina Jean Decoux was arrested, and replaced (by the Japanese government) with Bảo Đại. Despite its local backing, the government had no military power of its own. Bảo Đại later wrote that, while working there, he "felt isolated in a dead capital city." In August 1945, the August Revolution brought freedom to Vietnam, just days before the Japanese surrendered.

=== Kingdom of Cambodia – March 13, 1945 to October 16, 1945 ===
- (Khmer: ព្រះរាជាណាចក្រកម្ពុជា, Japanese: カンボジア王国)

Cambodia

In October 1940, the Franco-Thai War broke out between Vichy France and Thailand. The Japanese, using their power in the area (gained after the Japanese invasion of French Indochina), mediated the ceasefire, and got Vichy France to cede disputed territories to Thailand. On 8 December 1941, Japanese forces invaded Thailand, using bases in Cambodia. By July 1942, nationalists were growing more upset with the French rule in the area, and were planning a march against the French, when, on 17 July, their leader, Hem Chieu, was arrested after mentioning his ideas of a march to a Cambodian militiaman. This outraged the nationalists, and they staged a Japanese-backed rally on 20 July. The French reacted harshly, tracking down as many people as possible who attended the protest, then trying them. After the allied invasion of France, Japan began to grow fearful that the Free French Forces would align Cambodia with the allied cause. On 9 March 1945, Japan seized control of Cambodia in a coup d'état in French Indochina. On 13 March, Norodom Sihanouk agreed with Japanese wishes, and declared that Cambodia was now the independent Kingdom of Kampuchea, and nullified all Franco-Cambodian agreements. Within a day of the surrender of Japan, Cambodia was returned to French hands.

=== Kingdom of Luang Prabang – April 8, 1945 to October 12, 1945 ===
- (Lao: ອານາຈັກຫຼວງພະບາງ, Japanese: ルアンプラバン王国)

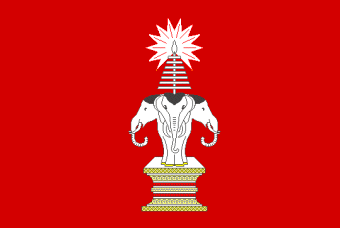
Laos

In March 1945, large numbers of French officials in Laos were then imprisoned or executed by the Japanese. The staunchly pro-French King Sisavang Vong was also imprisoned and forced by the Japanese, and at much urging from Prince Phetsarath, into declaring the French protectorate over his kingdom ended, while entering the nation into the Greater East Asia Co-Prosperity Sphere on 8 April 1945. Prince Phetsarath remained as Prime Minister in the newly independent puppet state.

== See also ==
- Japanese colonial empire
- Greater East Asia Co-Prosperity Sphere
- Tanaka Memorial
- Jewish settlement in the Japanese Empire
- List of wars involving Japan
- Sangokujin – 'third country person'
- Japanese Occupation
