= Flag of Mengjiang =

Mengjiang
- Flag of the Mengjiang United Autonomous Government
- Use: National flag
- Proportion: 2:3
- Adopted: 1 September 1939
- Design: A horizontal red bar in the middle, with two thin white bars surrounding it, within a blue bar, on a yellow field.

The flag used by the Mengjiang United Autonomous Government consists of a horizontal colour pattern of yellow, blue, white, red, white, blue and again yellow.

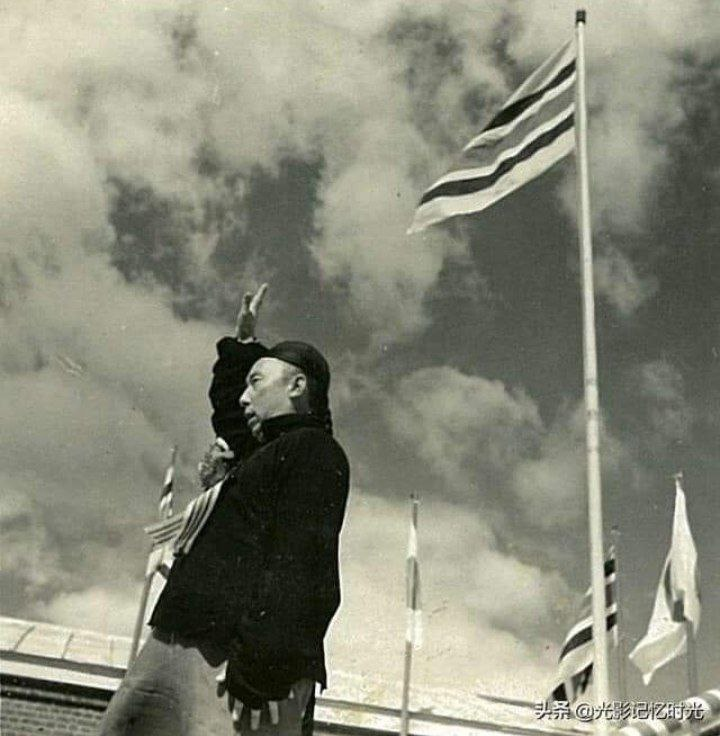
Demchugdongrub in front of the flags of Mengjiang and Japan.

The colors on the flag were used to represent major ethnic groups in Mengjiang: blue for the Mongols; red for the Japanese; yellow for the Han and white for the "Hui" (the name given to the Muslims at that time).

South Chahar, North Shanxi and the Mongol Military Government each had their respective flags before merged with the Mengjiang United Autonomous Government.

Flag of the Mongol Military Government and Mongol United Autonomous Government

Flag of the South Chahar Autonomous Government (1938-1939)

Flag of the North Shanxi Autonomous Government (1938-1939)

The colors on the flag of Mengjiang is similar to the Five Races Under One Union flag formerly used by the Republic of China. The flag is also similar in both colour and pattern to the flag used by the Young China Party.

== See also ==
- List of Chinese flags
- Flag of the People's Republic of China
- Flag of the Republic of China
- Flags of the Republic of China-Nanjing
- Flag of Manchukuo
