= Mengjiang yuan =

Chinese currency (1937–1945)

蒙疆銀行圓 (Chinese)
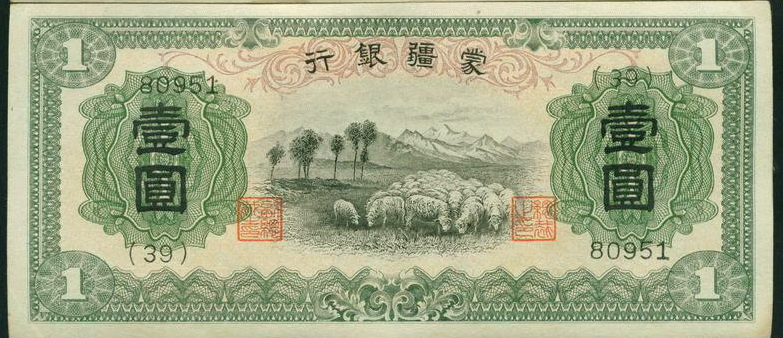
- Central Bank of Mengjiang 1 yuan

Denominations
- Subunit
- 1/10: Chiao/jiǎo
- 1/100: fēn
- Banknotes: 5 fēn, 1, 5 Chiao/jiǎo, 1, 5, 10, 100 yuan 1, 5, 10, 100, 1000 yuan
- Coins: 5 jiǎo

Demographics
- Date of introduction: 1937
- Date of withdrawal: 1951
- Replaced by: People's Bank of China banknotes
- User(s): Mongol Military Government (1936-1937); Mongol United Autonomous Government (1937-1939); Mengjiang United Autonomous Government (1939-1945) Inner Mongolian People's Republic; Inner Mongolia Autonomous Region

Issuance
- Central bank: Southern Chahar bank Bank of Mengchiang
- This infobox shows the latest status before this currency was rendered obsolete.

The Mengjiang yuan is the monetary unit that was issued in 1937–1945 by several governments of Mengjiang (Mengkiang).

== History ==
In April 1934, the Chinese government recognized the autonomy of Inner Mongolia. Japan, which controlled part of the territory of Inner Mongolia at that time, provoked separatist speeches in 1935–1936. On December 22, 1935 (according to other sources - May 27, 1936) the independence of Inner Mongolia was proclaimed. On May 12, 1936, with the help of the Japanese, the Mongolian military government was created.

On October 28, 1937, the government was merged with the provincial governments of Southern Chahar and Northern Shanxi, forming the "Mengjiang Joint Committee". On November 27 of the same year, complete independence from China was proclaimed, the military government was transformed into a formally civilian autonomous government of the United Mongolian aimags. On September 1, 1939, the United Autonomous Government of Menjiang was created. On August 4, 1941, the name of the state was changed, the Mongolian Autonomous Federation was proclaimed.

In August 1945, with the beginning of the Soviet–Japanese War, the troops of Inner Mongolia took part in the battles on the side of Japan. On October 10, 1945, the People’s Republic of Inner Mongolia was proclaimed in the territory liberated from the Japanese and their allies. With the departure of the Soviet troops in 1946, the republic lost control over most of its territory. In parallel with it, the People’s Autonomous Government of Eastern Mongolia (ru) was established in the east of the region. The authorities of both republics succeeded in uniting their states, and on May 1, 1947, the Autonomous Government of Inner Mongolia was created in most of Mengjiang in the provinces of Suiyuan, Rehe and Chakhar.

== Emission in the territory of Inner Mongolia ==
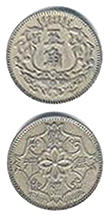
5 chiao/jiao of 1938 года

At the beginning of 1937, the South Chakhar Bank (Cha-Nan Bank) was created in Kalgan, for its issue it used banknotes of the “Provincial Bank of Three Eastern Provinces”, sample 1929, in 1, 5, 10 and 100 yuan, which were overprinted. Soon, this bank was replaced by the newly created Bank of Menjiang, which began issuing new banknotes. The Bank of Mengjiang issued banknotes of 5 fyn, 1, 5 jiao, 5 jiao - 50 fyn, 1, 5, 10, 100 yuan. In 1938, a 5-jiao copper-nickel coin was issued.

After the liquidation of the Mongolian Autonomous Federation in 1945 and the proclamation of the People’s Republic of Inner Mongolia, the Mengjiang Banknotes continued to be used in circulation. In 1945–1946, the Yuan of the Red Army Command (ru) was issued to provide Soviet military units, in parallel with the previously issued banknotes.

In August 1948, monetary reform began in China, and on December 1 of the same year, the People's Bank of China was established through the merger of three banks. However, the unification of monetary circulation in China required considerable time and was completed only by the beginning of 1952. The exchange rate for the single currency was set separately for each local issue of money. The exchange of the yuan of Inner Mongolia into the bank notes of the People’s Bank of China was made in 1951 at a ratio of 91/2: 1.

=== Banknotes of Mengjiang Bank ===
| Image | | Face value | Dimensions (mm) |
| Front side | Downside | Face value | Dimensions (mm) |
|---|---|---|---|
| | | 5 fen | |
| | | 1 Chiao/jiao | |
| | | 1 yuan | |
| | | 5 yuan | |
| | | 10 yuan | |

== See also ==
- Manchukuo yuan
- Tuvan akşa

== Bibliography ==
- Сенилов Б.В. (1991). Военные деньги Второй мировой войны. М.: Финансы и статистика.
- Cuhaj G., Michael T., Miller H. (2011). Standard Catalog of World Coins 1901-2000 (39-е изд ed.). Iola: Krause Publications. ISBN 978-1-4402-1160-7.
- Cuhaj G.S. (2008). Standard Catalog of World Paper Money. General Issues 1368—1960 (12-е изд ed.). Iola: Krause Publications. ISBN 978-0-89689-730-4.
