= Cui Xiaoqian =

Director of the Department of Finance
- In office October 15, 1937 – September 1, 1939
- Head of state: Xia Gong (as representing North Shanxi in the Mengjiang United Committee)
- Head of government: Maejima Masu
- Preceded by: Position established
- Succeeded by: Ma Yongkui

Mengjiang Bank Committee
- In office November 23, 1937 – January 16, 1938
- Director-general: Booyüweijiyuu (Baoyuejiao)
- Succeeded by: Chen Wenbing

Personal details
- Profession: Government official
- Cabinet: Xia Gong Government

Cui Xiaoqian (simplified Chinese: 崔效骞; traditional Chinese: 崔效騫; pinyin: Cuī Xiàoqiān; Wade–Giles: Ts'ui^{1} Hsiao^{4}-ch'ien^{1}) was a government figure in both Mengjiang and North Shanxi during the Second Sino-Japanese War when these regions were under Japanese occupation. Little information is known about Cui himself, though his position inside the North Shanxi Autonomous Government is apparent.

Under the leadership of Cui Xiaoqian, Japanese efforts to extend their control of occupation were enacted, such as with the creation of the Labor Control Committee of North Shanxi.

== Career ==
On October 15, 1937, Cui was appointed to the position of director within the Department of Finance of the North Shanxi Autonomous Government during the "Bring the Shanxi Province to Autonomy" conference held in Datong. It is unknown if Cui served any role in the interim administration of Chen Yuming while the region was still under direct Japanese army control before October 15, 1937, though this may have occurred. After this date however, Cui was given an official role within the new collaborationist government of North Shanxi along with Hashimoto Otoji, who served as his consultant.

On November 23, 1937, a month after being appointed into the government of North Shanxi, Cui was appointed into the Mengjiang Bank Committee, a part of the Xingya Association. This position allowed Cui to maintain an important role in maintaining the region's economics, despite not being Japanese, or part of the Japanese government in a more direct manner.

In mid-1939, the Labor Control Committee of North Shanxi (Chinese: 晋北勞働統制委員會; pinyin: Jìnběi láodòng tǒngzhì wěiyuánhuì; Wade–Giles: Chin^{4}-pei^{3} lao^{2}-tung^{4} t'ung^{3}-chih^{4} wei^{3}-yüan^{2}-hui^{4}) was created. This organization, which was under the control of the North Shanxi Department of Finance, pressed 8,000 Chinese laborers into coal mining operations in and around Datong until the group's dissolution in 1943.

Some of Cui's economic decisions have been criticized, such as the lack of economic cohesion in North Shanxi at this time. Despite being an integral member of the so-called "economic unification" of Mengjiang, North Shanxi, and South Chahar, over 17 different currencies were used within the state. This led to, as described by Zhang Fo of Hebei University, a "chaotic" situation. Under Cui, bank-made and company-made currencies were banned however, showing at least a basic effort towards economic centralization within the state.

In 1938, Cui was replaced in his position by Chen Wenbing within the Mengjiang Bank Committee, though he was still part of the larger Xingya Association. The following year, however, Cui Xiaoqian lost his position within the North Shanxi Autonomous Government when it became a semi-autonomous province of Mengjiang, lessening the autonomy of the state to a point where the sub-national administration was not needed.
