= Xia Gong =

Chinese politician and Axis collaborator (1872–?)

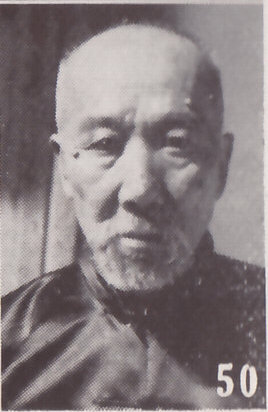
Xia Gong as pictured in The Most Recent Biographies of Chinese Dignitaries

Xia Gong (Chinese: 夏恭; pinyin: Xià Gōng; Wade–Giles: Hsia Kung; 1872–?) was a politician of the Republic of China. He was the Head of the Japanese puppet government known as the North Shanxi Autonomous Government. Later he was appointed vice-chairman of the Mengjiang United Autonomous Government. He was born in Datong County, Shanxi province.

== Biography ==
In the end of Qing dynasty, he became a Juren. Later he successively held the positions of teacher of junior high school and governor of county.

In 1937, the Imperial Japanese Army occupied Datong. Xia Gong was invited by the Japanese to organize the Peace Preservation Council in Northern Shanxi. In October the North Shanxi Autonomous Government was established, and he was appointed its Supreme Member.

In November 1937, the Mongol United Autonomous Government, the South Chahar Autonomous Government and the Northern Shanxi Autonomous Government held a representative assembly in Zhangjiakou. Then the Mengjiang United Committee was established, Xia Gong and Ma Yongkui was appointed a General Member.

In September 1939, the three autonomous governments merged into the Mengjiang United Autonomous Government, Xia Gong was appointed its vice-chairman. The following January, he resigned his post, and became an executive head of the Datong Colliery Co., Ltd.

According to Xu (2007), p. 1132, Xia Gong died in 1941. But according to the articles of Asahi Shimbun, he had been still alive in 1943. After 1944, the whereabouts of Xia Gong remained unknown.

== Footnotes ==
- Xu Youchun (徐友春) (main ed.) (2007). Unabridged Biographical Dictionary of the Republic, Revised and Enlarged Version (民国人物大辞典 增订版). Hebei People's Press (Hebei Renmin Chubanshe; 河北人民出版社). ISBN 978-7-202-03014-1.
- Liu Shoulin (刘寿林) (etc.ed.) (1995). The Chronological Table of the Republic's Officer (民国职官年表). Zhonghua Book Company. ISBN 7-101-01320-1.
- Committee for Problems of East Asia (東亜問題調査会） (1941). The Biographies of Most Recent Chinese Important People (最新支那要人伝). Asahi Shimbun.
