= Yu Pinqing =

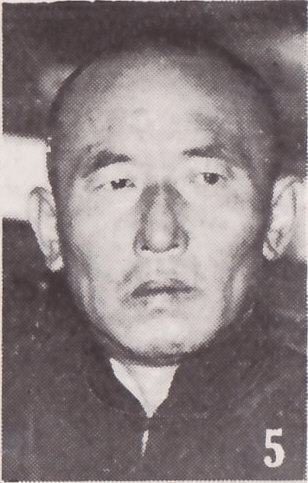
Yu Pinqing as pictured in The Most Recent Biographies of Chinese Dignitaries

Yu Pinqing (simplified Chinese: 于品卿; traditional Chinese: 於品卿; pinyin: Yú Pǐnqīng; Wade–Giles: Yü P'in-ch'ing) (1886 – December 24, 1945) was a politician and industrialist in the Republic of China. He was Supreme Member of the Southern Chahar Autonomous Government (察南自治政府; Chánán Zìzhì Zhèngfǔ), later he was also appointed vice-chairman of the Mongolian United Autonomous Government (蒙古联合自治政府; 蒙古聯合自治政府; Ménggǔ liánhé zìzhì zhèngfǔ) and the Mongolian Autonomous Federation (蒙古自治邦; Ménggǔ zìzhì bāng). He was born in Nangong, Zhili (Hebei).

== Biography ==
Yu Pinqing was an industrialist in Zhangjiakou. In 1924 he became an executive member of the chamber of commerce in Zhangjiakou.

In August 1937 Japanese Army occupied Zhangjiakou. Yu Pinqing was invited by Japanese, and he was appointed a member of the Peace Preservation Council in Chahar. In next month, Southern Chahar Autonomous Government was established, he was appointed Supreme Member of it. In November, the Mongolian United League Autonomous Government (蒙古联盟自治政府; 蒙古聯盟自治政府; Ménggǔ liánméng zìzhì zhèngfǔ), the Southern Chahar Autonomous Government and the Northern Shanxi Autonomous Government (晋北自治政府; 晉北自治政府; Jìn běi zìzhì zhèngfǔ) held a representative assembly at Zhangjiakou. Then the Mengjiang United Committee (蒙疆联合委员会; 蒙疆聯合委員會; Méng jiāng liánhé wěiyuánhuì) was established, Yu was appointed a member of it.

In September 1939 three autonomous governments merged into the Mongolian United Autonomous Government, Yu Pinqing was appointed vice-chairman of it. In 1941 Mongolian United Autonomous Government was renamed and reformed to the Mongolian Autonomous Federation, while he also stayed on vice-chairman of it.

In August 1945 Mongolian Autonomous Federation had collapsed, then the Eighth Route Army occupied Zhangjiakou, and Yu Pinqing was arrested by it. In December 23 this year because of the charge of treason and surrender to enemy (namely Hanjian), he was sentenced to death on special tribunal, and executed by firing squad in the next day.
