= Inner Mongolian People's Republic =

Historical state

Inner Mongolian People's Republic 內蒙古人民共和國ᠪᠦᠭᠦᠳᠡ ᠨᠠᠶᠢᠷᠠᠮᠳᠠᠬᠤ ᠥᠪᠥᠷ ᠮᠣᠩᠭᠣᠯ ᠠᠷᠠᠳ ᠤᠯᠤᠰ Бүгд Найрамдах Өвөр Монгол Ард Улс
- 1945
- Flag according to constitution

- Inner Mongolian People's Republic in green (note the exclusion of Jining District, a Han-majority county created in 1922) Modern-day Inner Mongolia in light green
- Capital: Sonid Right Banner
- Common languages: Mongolian, Chinese
- Government: Socialist republic
- Historical era: Chinese Civil War
  - Established: 9 September 1945
  - Disestablished: 6 November 1945
| Preceded by | Succeeded by |
| Soviet occupation of Manchuria | Communist-controlled China (1927–1949) |
- Today part of: China

The Inner Mongolian People's Republic was a state in Inner Mongolia founded shortly after the Second World War. It existed from 9 September 1945 until 6 November 1945.

== History ==
During the Second Sino-Japanese War, the Japanese established a puppet state in Inner Mongolia called Mengjiang. Mengjiang was disbanded by the invasion of Soviet and Mongolian troops in August 1945. On 9 September 1945, a congress of "People's Representatives" was held in what is now the Sonid Right Banner. The congress was attended by representatives, 80 of whom were from the Chahar, Xilingol, and Siziwang areas. The congress proclaimed the Inner Mongolian People's Republic, and a provisional government of 27 members was elected, of whom 11 were in the Standing Committee.

The Chinese Communist Party took notice of the government, fearing separatism. The CCP sent Ulanhu to take control of the situation, and he ordered the Inner Mongolian government to be dissolved. The region was later organised as the Inner Mongolian Autonomous Region.

== See also ==
- Mongolian People's Republic in Outer Mongolia
