= Mongol United Autonomous Government =

Japanese puppet regime in Inner Mongolia (1937–39

Mongol United Autonomous Government 蒙古聯盟自治政府 (Japanese, Chinese) Ménggǔ Liánméng Zìzhì Zhèngfǔ Mōngōru Renmei Jichi Seifu ᠮᠣᠩᠭᠣᠯᠤᠨ ᠥᠪᠡᠷᠲᠡᠭᠡᠨ ᠵᠠᠰᠠᠬᠤ ᠨᠢᠭᠡᠳᠦᠭᠰᠡᠨ ᠵᠠᠰᠠᠭᠤᠨ ᠣᠷᠳᠣᠨ Монголын Өөртөө Засах Нэгдсэн Засгийн Ордон (Mongolian)
- 1937–1939
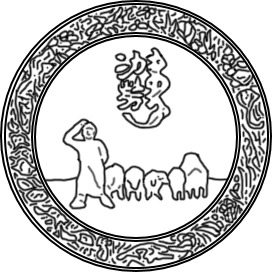
- Flag Coat of arms

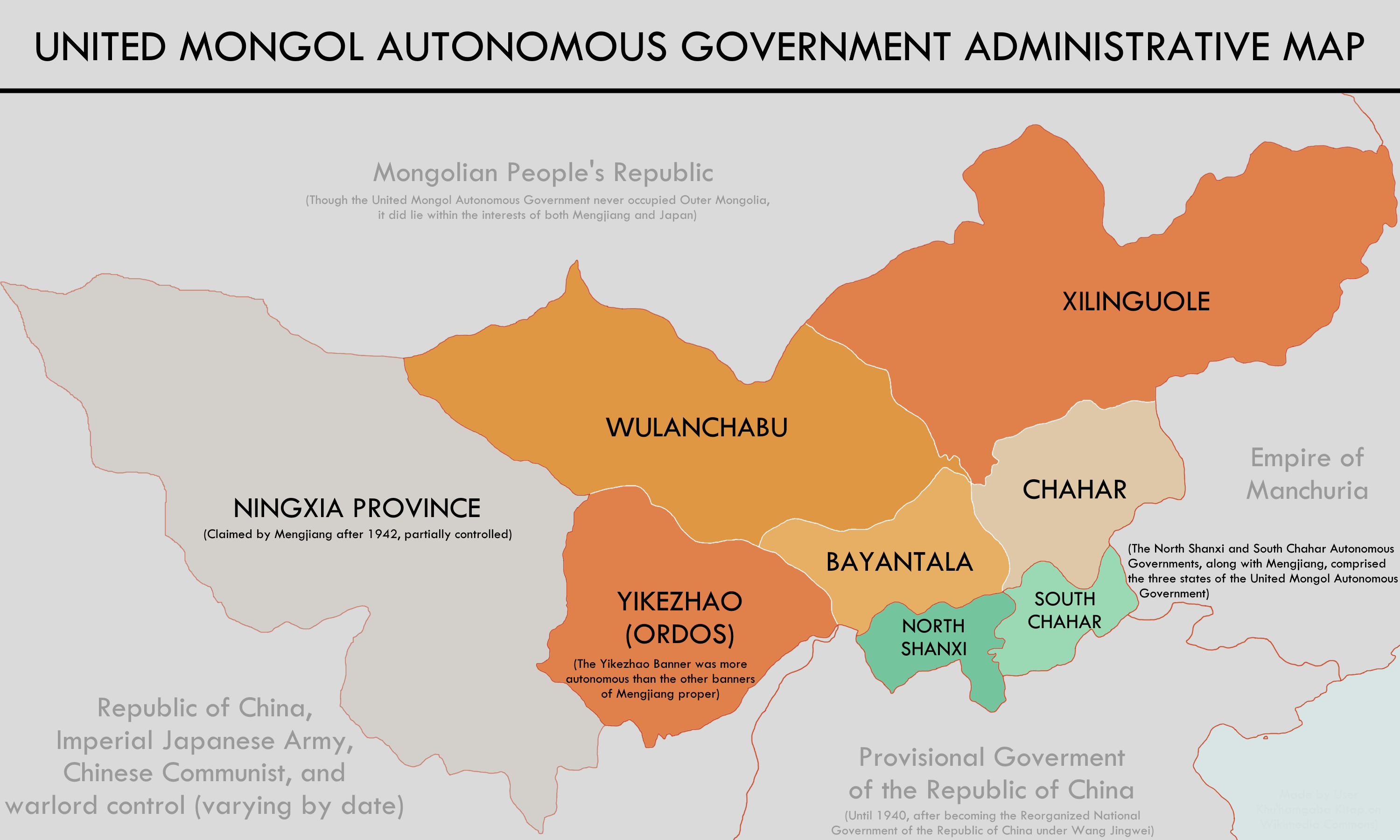
- Map of the United Mongol Autonomous Government
- Status: Administratively autonomous component of Mengjiang
- Capital: Hohhot
- Common languages: Mongolian; Chinese; Japanese
- Government: Civil administration
- Historical era: Second Sino-Japanese War; World War II
  - Capture of Hohhot and Baotou: 27 October 1937
  - Merger into the Mongol United Autonomous Government: 1 September 1939
- Currency: Mengjiang yuan
| Preceded by | Succeeded by |
| Mengjiang | Mengjiang |
- Today part of: China

The Mongol United Autonomous Government was a Japanese puppet regime in Inner Mongolia from 1937 to 1939.

== History ==
Following the Marco Polo Bridge Incident, Japan was eager to send troops into Inner Mongolia, and on October 14, 1937, the Japanese captured Hohhot and October 17th, Baotou. On October 27, the 2nd Mongol Conference was held in Hohhot with the assistance of Japan, and the Mongol United Autonomous Government was established on the 28th along with the Inner Mongolian Interim Law, the Inner Mongolian Autonomous Government Referendum, and the election of Yondonwangchug as chairman of the government.

Along with other puppet governments in Mongolia, like the autonomous governments of South Chahar and North Shanxi, established the Mongolian-Jiangsu Joint Committee to administer general affairs within Inner Mongolia and Shanxi. On September 1, 1939, the governments went a step further by establishing the Mengjiang government.

== Organization ==
The Mongol United Autonomous Government was established in Hohhot with a chairman and vice chairman; "the chairman is the sovereign of the Mongol United Autonomous Government; in case of an incident, the chairman will act on his behalf". There was also the Governmental Council responsible for all administrations. The State Council included the Ministry of General Affairs, the Ministry of Finance, and the Ministry of Security, each with several smaller departments.

The subdivisions of the Mongol United Autonomous Government, under the jurisdiction of the Council of State Affairs, were the Ulan Chabu League, the Yikezhao League, the Chahar League, Bayantala League (established later on), and the Xilin Gol League, along with the municipal offices of Hohhot and Baotou. Each league office had one league leader, one deputy leader, and one Japanese participating official.

== See also ==
- Mengjiang
- North Shanxi Autonomous Government
- South Chahar Autonomous Government
