= Mengjiang =

Wang Jingwei regime autonomous zone

Coordinates: 40°49′N 114°53′E

Mengjiang United Autonomous Government (1939–1941) 蒙疆聯合自治政府 (Japanese, Chinese) Měngjiāng Liánhé Zìzhì Zhèngfǔ Mōkyō Rengō Jichi Seifu ᠮᠣᠩᠭᠣᠯ ‍ᠤᠨ ᠥᠪᠡᠷᠲᠡᠭᠡᠨ ᠵᠠᠰᠠᠬᠤ ᠬᠣᠯᠪᠣᠭᠠᠲᠤ ᠵᠠᠰᠠᠭ ‍ᠤᠨ ᠣᠷᠳᠣᠨ Монголын Өөртөө Засах Холбоот Засгийн Ордон (Mongolian) Mongolian Autonomous Union (1941–1945) 蒙古自治邦 (Japanese, Chinese) Ménggǔ Zìzhì Bāng Mōko Jichi Hō ᠮᠣᠩᠭᠣᠯ ‍ᠤᠨ ᠥᠪᠡᠷᠲᠡᠭᠡᠨ ᠵᠠᠰᠠᠬᠤ ᠤᠯᠣᠰ Монголын Өөртөө Засах Yлс (Mongolian)
- 1939–1945
- Flag

- Mengjiang (dark green) alongside the Wang Jingwei regime (light green) at its furthest extent
- Status: Puppet state of the Empire of Japan (1939–40); Autonomous region of the Reorganized National Government of the Republic of China (1940–45)
- Capital: Kalgan
- Common languages: Chinese; Mongolian; Japanese
- Religion: Buddhism (Chinese Buddhism, Tibetan Buddhism and Japanese Buddhism); Chinese folk religion; Taoism; Confucianism; Mongolian folk religion
- Government: De jure: Provisional government; De facto: Absolute monarchy (Note: Although officially, there was no monarch of Mengjiang, Demchugdongrub was of noble heritage and the Japanese used his status to add some legitimacy to the state.); under a military dictatorship
- Chairman
  - 1939–1945: Demchugdongrub
- Historical era: Second Sino-Japanese War; World War II
  - Established: 1 September 1939
  - Incorporated into the Reorganized National Government as an autonomous region: 24 March 1940
  - Disestablished: 19 August 1945
- Currency: Mengjiang yuan
Preceded by
Republic of China
Mongol United Autonomous Government
South Chahar Autonomous Government
North Shanxi Autonomous Government
Succeeded by
Reorganized National Government of China
Soviet occupation of Manchuria
Mongolian Autonomous Republic
- Today part of: China

Mengjiang

Chinese name
- Chinese: 蒙疆
- Literal meaning: Mongolian Frontier
Transcriptions
Standard Mandarin
- Hanyu Pinyin: Měngjiāng
- Wade–Giles: Meng^{3}-chiang^{1}

Mongolian name
- Mongolian Cyrillic: Мэнжян
- Mongolian script: ᠮᠡᠩᠵᠢᠩ

Japanese name
- Kanji: 蒙疆
Transcriptions
- Revised Hepburn: Mōkyō

Mengjiang, also known as Mengkiang, officially the Mengjiang United Autonomous Government, was an autonomous zone of the Wang Jingwei regime in Inner Mongolia. It was formed in 1939 as its own puppet state of the Empire of Japan, and from 1940 was placed under the sovereignty of the Wang Jingwei regime, which was itself a puppet government. It consisted of the previously Chinese provinces of Chahar and Suiyuan, corresponding to the central part of modern Inner Mongolia. It has also been called Mongukuo or Mengguguo (or Mengkukuo; Chinese: 蒙古國; in analogy to Manchukuo, another Japanese puppet state in Manchuria). The capital was Kalgan, from where it was under the nominal rule of Mongol nobleman Demchugdongrub. The territory returned to Chinese control after the defeat of the Japanese Empire in 1945.

== Background ==
Following Japan's occupation of Manchuria in 1931 and the establishment of the puppet state of Manchukuo, Japan sought to expand its influence in Mongolia and North China. In a series of actions, starting in 1933, the armies of Manchukuo and Japan occupied Chahar and in 1936 proclaimed itself the independent Mongol Military Government, allied with Japan under Prince Demchugdongrub.

In 1936 and 1937, similar operations in Suiyuan saw the occupation and absorption of that province, too.

== History ==
Formed on May 12, 1936, the Mongol Military Government (蒙古軍政府) had Prince Yondonwangchug of Ulanqab as its first chairman. It was renamed in October 1937 as the Mongol United Autonomous Government (蒙古聯盟自治政府). On September 1, 1939, the predominantly Han Chinese governments of South Chahar and North Shanxi were merged with the Mongol United Autonomous Government, creating the new Mengjiang United Autonomous Government (蒙疆聯合自治政府). The capital was established at Zhangbei (Changpei), near Kalgan (Zhangjiakou), with the government's control extending around Hohhot. On August 4, 1941, it was again renamed: the Mongolian Autonomous State (蒙古自治邦). The term "state" (邦) was specifically chosen to appease both the Chinese and Mengjiang governments, as both "state" and "country" translated to ulus (улс) in Mongolian, which means "country". Thus, the name in Chinese implied Mengjiang to be an autonomous region of China, whereas in Mongolian the name implied it to be an independent state.

In 1939, Wang Jingwei reorganized the remnants of the occupied Chinese government for a Japanese puppet state, commonly referred to as the Wang Jingwei Regime, or the Reorganized National Government, with its capital in Nanjing. Mengjiang was nominally incorporated into the regime in 1940, though it remained autonomous from Nanjing.

Mengjiang capitulated in 1945 when it was invaded by the Soviet Red Army and Mongol Red Army as part of the Manchurian Strategic Offensive Operation. Most of the area, with the notable exception of Kalgan, is now part of Inner Mongolia in the People's Republic of China.

Inner Mongolia in 1911

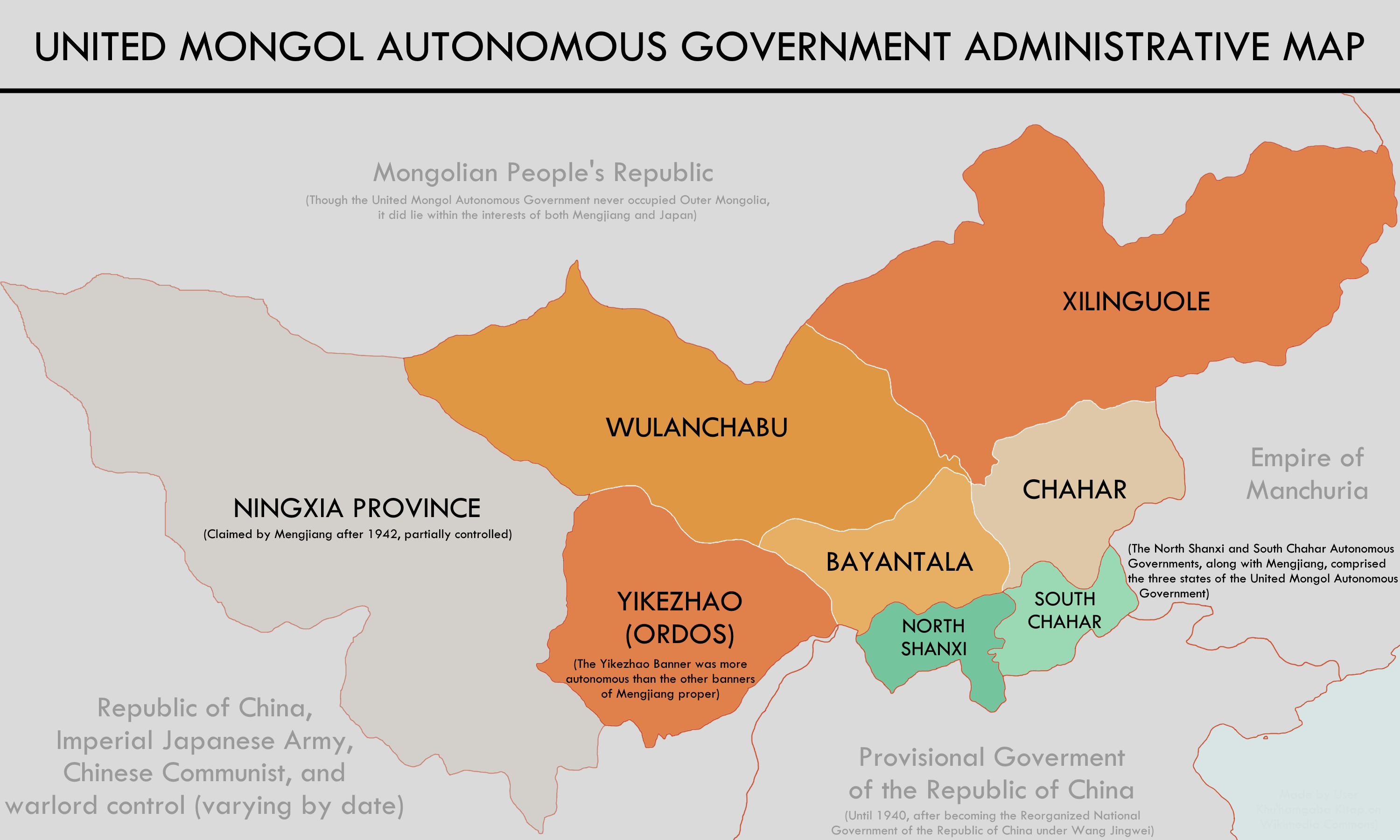
A map of the Mengjiang United Autonomous Government

The Reformed Government's territory in central China from 1937 until 1940 when all three states, Mengjiang, the Provisional Government of the ROC (not to be confused with the 1912 government of the same name and flag) and the Reformed Government of the ROC, merged into the Reorganized National Government of the ROC.

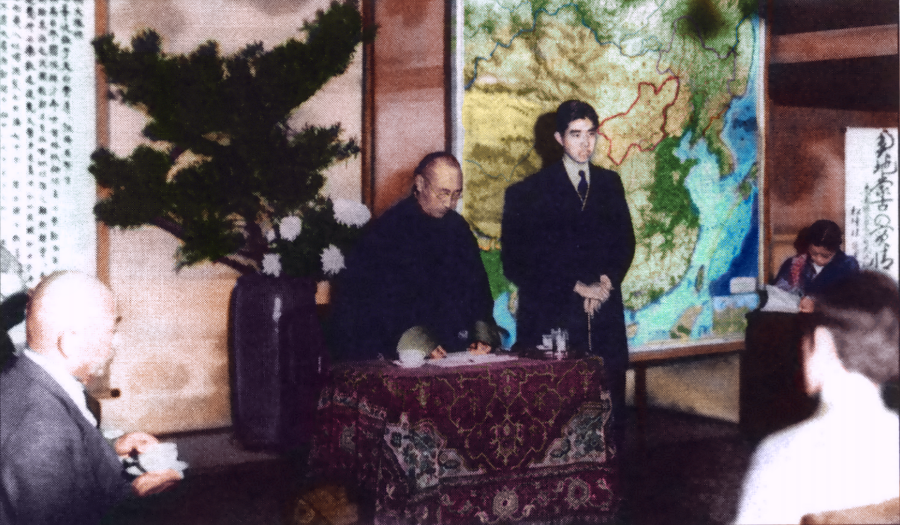
A lecture held in Japan in 1940 discussing Inner Mongolia and Mengjiang, note the map in the background featuring the state

Flag of the Mongol Military Government (1936–1937) and the Mongol United Autonomous Government (1937–1939)

Flag of the South Chahar Autonomous Government (1937–1939)

Flag of the North Shanxi Autonomous Government (1937–1939)

=== Legacy ===
Tens of thousands to hundreds of thousands of Mongols were massacred in the Inner Mongolia incident in 1967–1969, one of the reasons is that they were accused of being collaborator remnants from the Mengjiang army.

== Politics ==
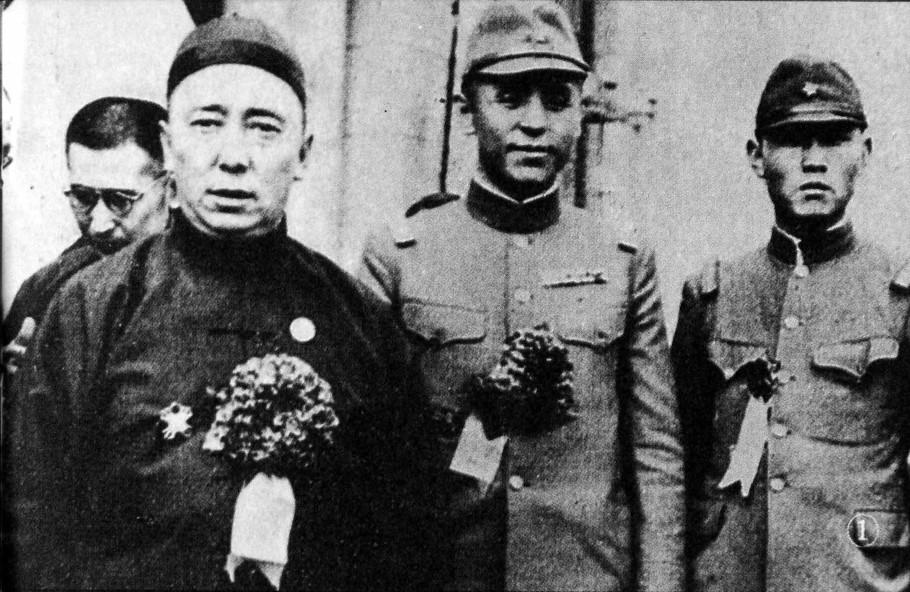
Prince Demchugdongrub (left) with the commander of the Inner Mongolian Army, General Li Shouxin (center)

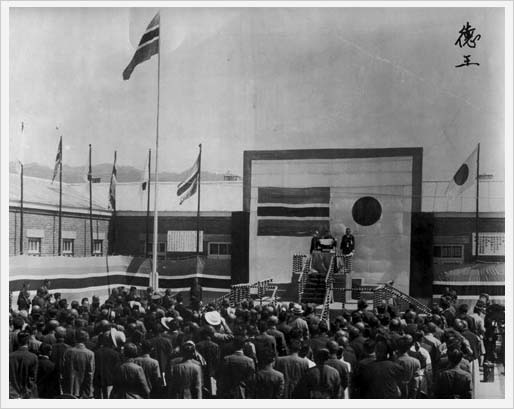
Foundation ceremony of Mengjiang's government

=== Institutions ===
- Directorate General of Communications
- Bank of Mengjiang
- Mongolian Military Command Headquarters
- Inner Mongolian Army
- North Shanxi Autonomous Government
- South Chahar Autonomous Government
- United Autonomous Government of Mengjiang
- Government Mongol administrative uls
- People's Autonomous Government of Eastern Mongolia
- Pailingmiao Autonomous Political Council (Mongolian political movement)

=== People ===
- Demchugdongrub: Khungtayji Head of State; Commander of the Mongolian Military Command Headquarters
- Li Shouxin: Chahar warlord, Chief of Staff of the Inner Mongolian Army (1937–1945)
- Yondonwangchug: First Chairman of Mengjiang (1936–1938)
- Altanochir: Minister of Communications, Head of the Mongolian Cultural Centre, Rector of the Mongolian Academy
- Altanochir (1882-1949): Deputy Head of Ordos City, General commander of the Ordos army
- Wu Heling: Director of the Counseling Bureau and Sub-General, Chairman of the House, President of the Preparatory School for Studying in Japan
- Jodbajab: Commander of the Mongol Militia, Deputy commander of the Pao An Tui
- Xia Gong: Supreme Member of the Northern Shanxi Autonomous Government, Vice-chairman of the Mongolian United Autonomous Government
- Cui Xiaoqian: Director of the Department of Finance (1937–1939), Member of the Mengjiang Bank Committee
- Yu Pinqing: Supreme Member of the Southern Chahar Autonomous Government, Vice-chairman of the Mongolian Autonomous Federation
- Wang Ying (ROC): Commander of the Grand Han Righteous Army, Chinese bandit and Warlord
- Gen Sugiyama: Commanding General of the Mongolia Garrison Army
- Sadamu Shimomura: Commander of Mongolia Garrison Army
- Hideki Tōjō: Commander of the 1st Independent Mixed Brigade, Chahar Expeditionary Force
- Kitsuju Ayabe: Colonel, engaged in Chahar area operation as Staff Officer, Kwantung Army, North China Detachment
- Torashirō Kawabe: Military advisor

== Name ==
Mengjiang, meaning "Mongol Territories", came from the acceptance speech of chairmanship by Demchugdongrub:

To recover the territories originally owned by the Mongols
(收復蒙古固有疆土)

== Economy ==
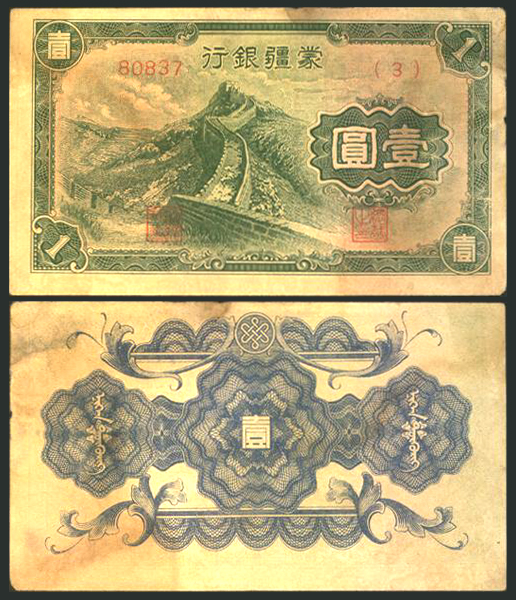
One-yuan banknote issued by the Bank of Mengjiang, 1940

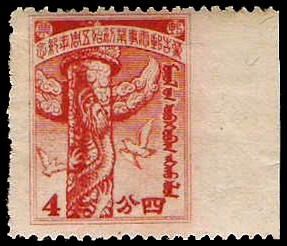
A 1943 postage stamp of Mengjiang

The Japanese established the Bank of Mengjiang that printed its own currency without years on it. Some traditional local money shops also made currency with the Chinese year numbering system, such as the Jiachen Year (甲辰年), on it.

The Japanese had mineral interests in their created state of Mengjiang. In one example the Japanese put the iron mine in Xuanhua Longyan into production, with a reserve of 91,645,000 tonnes in 1941; and analyzed the reserves of coal in land, one was 504 tonnes, and another with a potential production of 202,000 of tonnes (1934).

The Mengjiang iron deposits were exported directly to Japan. At the same time, the Japanese sought the coal reserves of Suiyuan (another Mengjiang occupied sector), including one of 417 million tonnes, and one with a potential extraction of 58,000 tonnes in 1940.

== Military ==
Mengjiang emblem used on the mastheads of some documents

The Inner Mongolian Army, or the Mengjiang National Army was the Japanese-created native army organized in Mengjiang; not to be confused with the Mongol Army. It was a Kwantung Army special force group under direct command, having native commanders alongside Japanese commanding officers, as in other auxiliary outer sections of the Kwantung Army.

The purpose of the army was to support any eventual Japanese operations against Outer Mongolia (Mongolian People's Republic), or the north China areas, and to act as a local security force, with the local police forces. It also had the duty of protecting Prince De Wang, the head of state, and the Mengjiang native establishment and local government properties.

The army was equipped with rifles, pistols, light and medium machine guns, mortars and some artillery and anti-aircraft guns. It was organised as a mobile cavalry and light infantry force with little artillery support, and did not have tanks or aircraft. The commander of the army, for most of its existence, was a pro-Japanese general of Mongol descent, Li Shouxin.

=== History ===
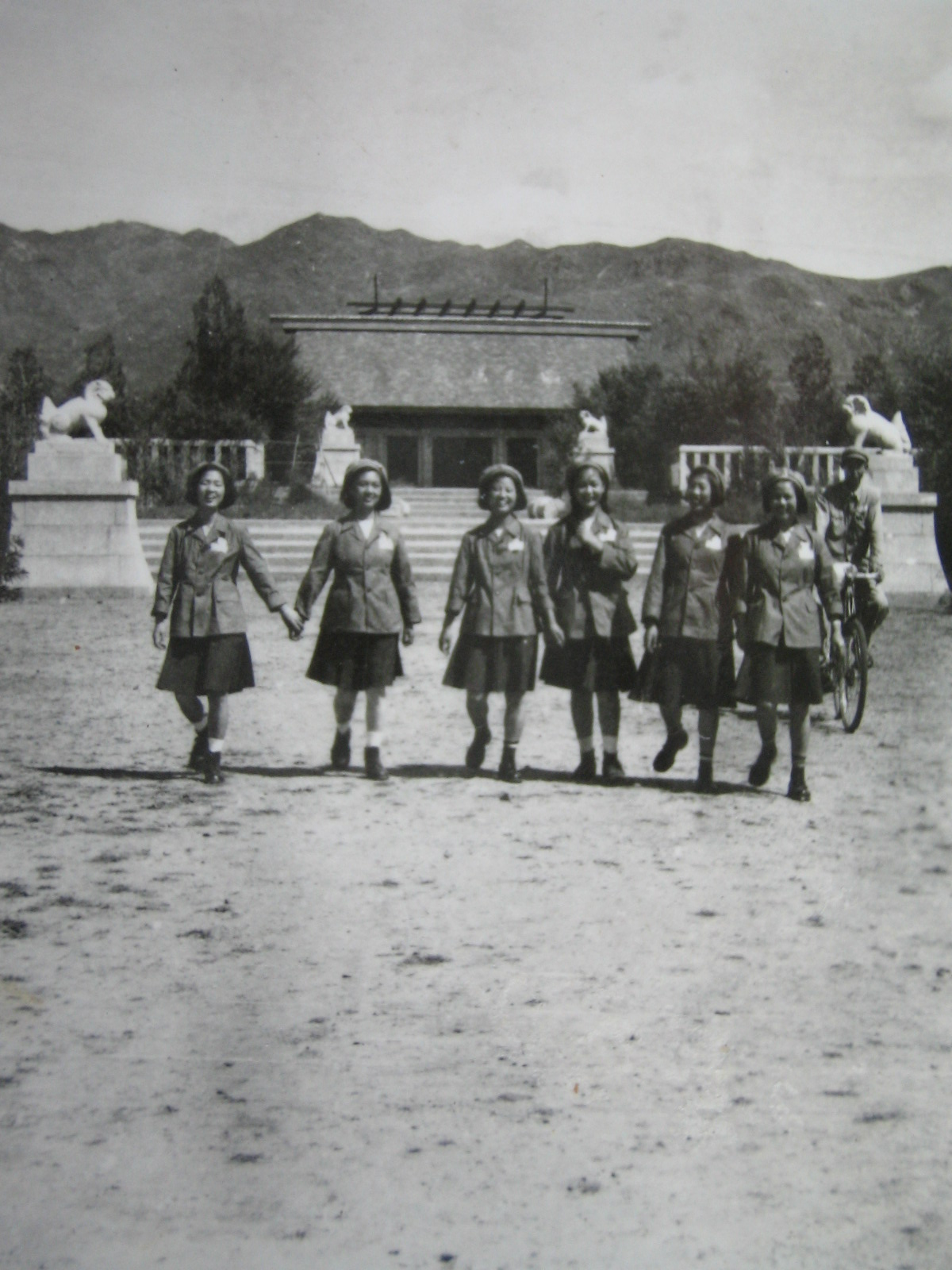
Mengjiang shrine in Zhangjiakou, Hebei, in the 1950s

In 1936, the Inner Mongolian Army was armed with Mauser rifles and they had 200 machine guns: mostly the Czechoslovak ZB-26 and a few Swiss Sig. Model 1930 submachine gun for Teh Wang's 1,000 bodyguard troops. They had 70 artillery pieces, mostly mortars and a few captured Chinese mountain and field guns of a variety of types (making ammo and spare parts a problem). The few tanks and armored cars were captured Chinese vehicles crewed by Japanese.

After the Suiyuan Campaign, the Mengjiang National Army was rebuilt from the defeated remnants of the Inner Mongolian Army, the new eight Mongol cavalry Divisions were 1,500 men strong, in three regiments of 500 men. Each regiment were to have three Saber companies and a machine gun company of 120 men. However these divisions actually ranged in size from 1,000 men to 2,000 men (8th Division).

In 1939, the ethnic Chinese troops in the Mongol Divisions were brigaded together in the 1st, 2nd and 3rd Divisions and turned into the 1st, 2nd and 3rd Ch'ing An Tui Brigades of the "Mongolian Pacification Force" and used against various guerrilla groups.

In 1943, the Mongol 4th and 5th Divisions were combined to form a new 8th Division and the old 7th and 8th Divisions formed the new 9th Division. Strength of the army was between 4,000 and 10,000 men, all cavalry at this time and had little heavy equipment.

The Mengjiang state also had 5 Defense Divisions in 1943, made up of local militia and other security forces, nominally of three regiments. Apparently only one of these regiments in each division was capable of operations. In 1944, the Japanese reorganized them along with the Chahar garrisons into four Divisions of 2,000 men each.

At the end of the war, a total of six divisions (two Cavalry and four Infantry), three Independent Ch'ing An Tui Brigades and a "Pao An Tui" Security Force Regiment made up the Army.

The sole secondary language which could be taught in schools was Japanese while students were forced to pay respect to the Emperor of Japan and Shinto. The government and army of Mengjiang were complete puppets of the Japanese.

== See also ==
- Inner Mongolian Army
- Japanese imperialism
- List of East Asian leaders in the Japanese sphere of influence (1931-1945)
- Wang Jingwei Government

== General sources ==
- Jowett, Phillip S. Rays of the Rising Sun: Armed Forces of Japan's Asian Allies 1931–45. Volume I: China & Manchuria. Solihull: Helion, 2004.
- Lattimore, Owen (December 1937). "The Phantom of Mengkukuo". Pacific Affairs. 10 (4): 420–27. doi:10.2307/2750626. JSTOR 2750626.
