= Great Way Government =

1937–1938 puppet government in Japanese-occupied Shanghai

Great Way Municipal Government of Shanghai 上海市大道政府; 上海市大道政府 Pinyin: Shànghǎi Shì Dàdào Zhèngfǔ Japanese: Shanhai Shi Daidō Seifu
- 1937–1938
- Flag

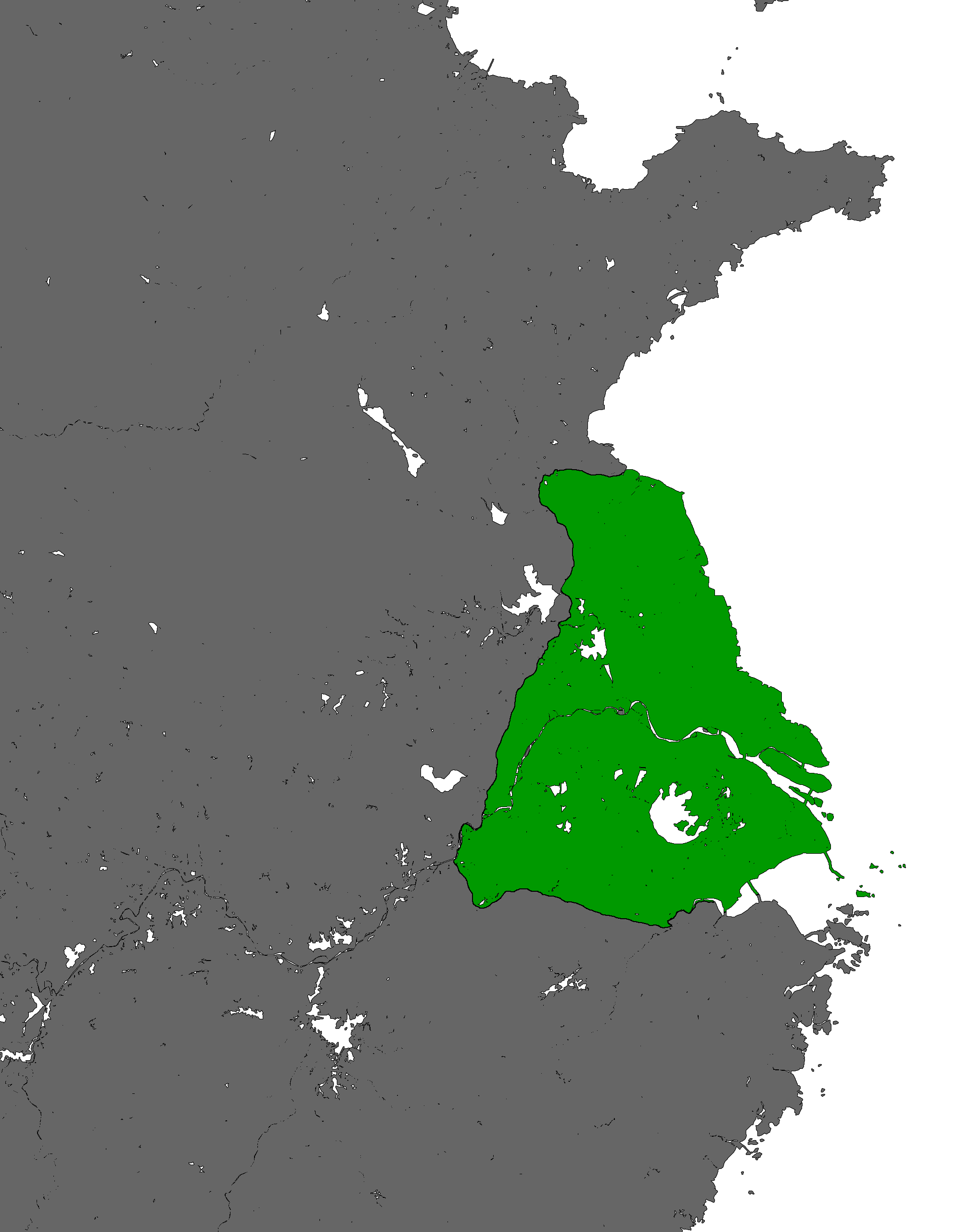
- Status: Puppet regime of the Empire of Japan
- Capital: Pudong
- Common languages: Mandarin Chinese; Japanese
- Chairman
  - 1937–1938: Su Xiwen
- Historical era: Second Sino-Japanese War
  - Established: 5 December 1937
  - Disestablished: 3 May 1938
Preceded by	Succeeded by
Republic of China	Reformed Government of the Republic of China

Great Way Government

Chinese name
- Chinese: 上海市大道政府
- Literal meaning: Shanghai Municipality Great Way Government
Transcriptions
Standard Mandarin
- Hanyu Pinyin: Shànghǎi Shì Dàdào Zhèngfǔ
- Wade–Giles: Shang^{4}-hai^{3} Shih^{4} Ta^{4}-tao^{4} Cheng^{4}-fu^{3}

Japanese name
- Kanji: 上海市大道政府
Transcriptions
- Romanization: Shanhai Shi Daidō Seifu

The Great Way or Dadao Government, formally the Great Way Municipal Government of Shanghai, was a short-lived puppet state proclaimed in Pudong on December 5, 1937, to administer Japanese-occupied Shanghai in the early stages of the Second Sino-Japanese War.

== Background ==
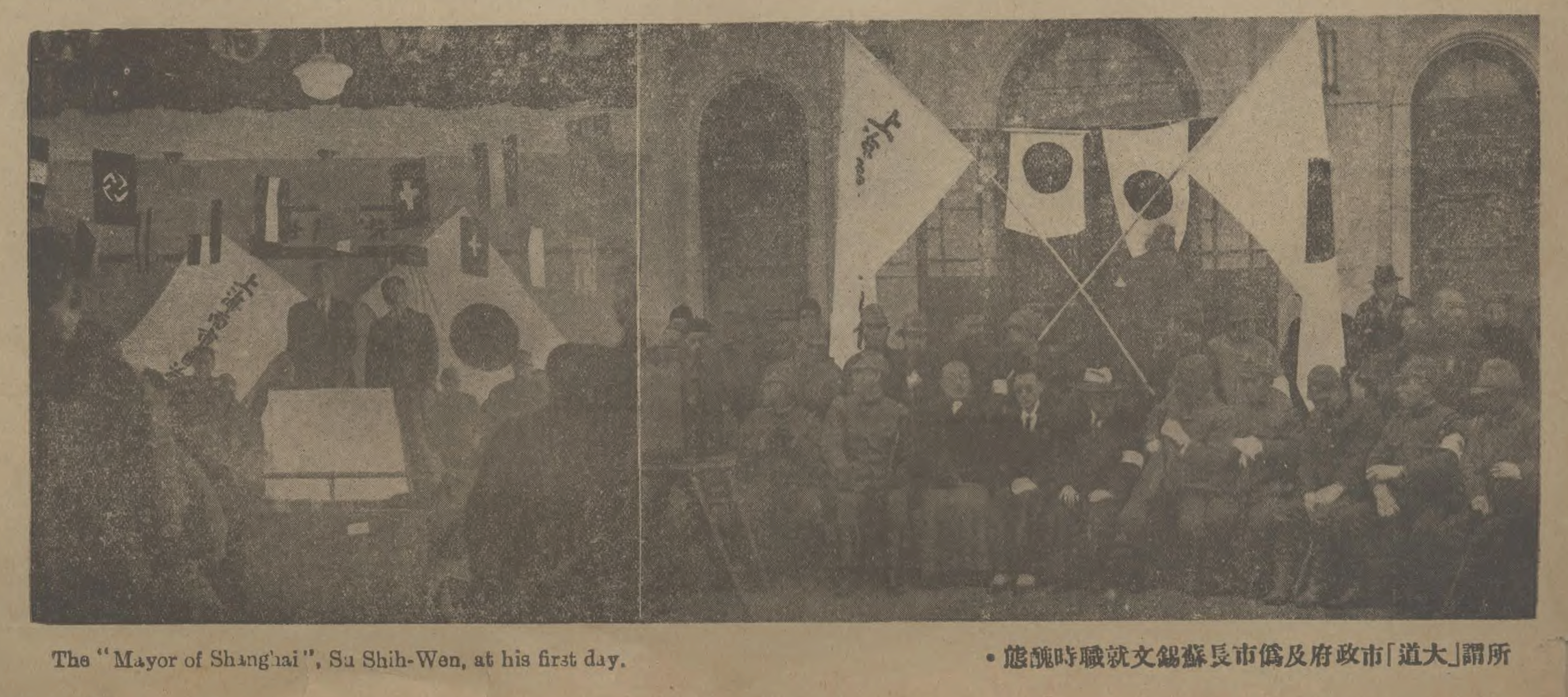
Ceremony of the establishment of the Great Way Government

Following the Battle of Shanghai of 1937, the cabinet of Japanese Prime Minister Fumimaro Konoe pushed for a quick and diplomatic settlement to the war in China, and not an expensive and long-term occupation (see Trautmann mediation). Furthermore, the Japanese Imperial General Headquarters was not keen to permit a repeat of the political experimentation undertaken by the Kwantung Army in the establishment of Manchukuo, and pressured the Japanese Central China Area Army to establish a collaborationist local government to handle the details of local administration for the Shanghai metropolitan area.

In November 1937, a number of well-known residents were approached to take over provisional civilian administration of the city. Eventually, the Japanese were able to secure the assistance of Fu Xiao'an (傅筱庵), the wealthy director of the Chinese Bank of Commerce and head of the Shanghai General Chamber of Commerce. Fu was a personal and political enemy of Nationalist general and de facto leader Chiang Kai-shek and had been imprisoned by the Kuomintang in 1927 for refusing to lend Chiang money. After his release from prison, he fled to Kwantung Leased Territory (modern Lüshunkou, Dalian), and lived several years under Japanese protection, nursing his hatred for Chiang.

However, Fu was unwilling to head the new government himself, and recommended Su Xiwen (苏锡文), a professor of religious philosophy and political science at the Chizhi University in Jiangwan. Su was a graduate of Waseda University in Tokyo and was known for his conservative political views. Su was also known for his views on Buddhist-Daoist syncretism, which influenced the name of the new administration—the "Great Way" referring to Eastern philosophy's concept of the Tao—and its flag: the yin-yang symbol of Daoism on a yellow background. (The colors yellow, gold, and saffron are often associated with Buddhism.)

== History ==
The new government quickly made efforts to restore the city's public services and established a police force under the command of Zhang Songlin, former commander of the Jiangsu provincial police, to maintain public order. Funding was provided by a tax levied on all imports and exports through the Japanese front lines into and out of Shanghai, and Su was assisted by a number of experts provided by the South Manchurian Railroad Company. Su promised to purge the city of both communist and Kuomintang elements. However, neither Su nor his Great Way Government were regarded seriously by Japanese political agents, who looked with dismay and contempt at the assortment of criminals, religious cultists, and narcotics dealers who gravitated to leading positions in the new administration. The promised public works failed to materialize as Su's cronies siphoned off funds, and the propaganda value of the new administration quickly deteriorated. In December 1937, the Japanese brought in a tough northern Chinese collaborator named Wang Zihui to oversee operations as a temporary measure.

After Liang Hongzhi established the Reformed Government of the Republic of China in Nanjing, the occupied Nationalist capital, in March 1938, the Japanese Central China Area Army organized a number of public rallies and ceremonies in support. In less than a month, the Reformed Government asserted its authority over the Great Way Government by establishing a Supervisory Yamen to take over the functions of the Shanghai municipal administration. Su Xiwen formally recognized the Reformed Government and adopting its flag on May 3, 1938.

Under the Reformed Government, Su Xiwen continued as head of the Supervisory Yamen until he was replaced by Fu Xiao'an as mayor on October 16, 1938.
