= South Chahar Autonomous Government =

Former autonomous area in Mongolia

Coordinates: 40°49′N 114°53′E

South Chahar Autonomous Government 察南自治政府(Japanese, Chinese) Chá Nán Zìzhì Zhèngfǔ Samminami Jichi Seifu ᠡᠮᠦᠨᠡᠲᠦ ᠴᠢᠬᠠᠷ ᠤᠨ ᠬᠣᠯᠪᠣᠭᠠᠲᠤ ᠵᠠᠰᠠᠭ ᠤᠨ ᠣᠷᠳᠣᠨ Өмнөд Чахарын Холбоот Засгийн Ордон (Mongolian)
- 1937–1939
- Flag
- Motto: 日察如一、剷除共黨、民族協和、民生向上 Japanese-Chahar Unity, Eradication of Communist Forces, Ethnic Coordination, Improvement of People's Lives
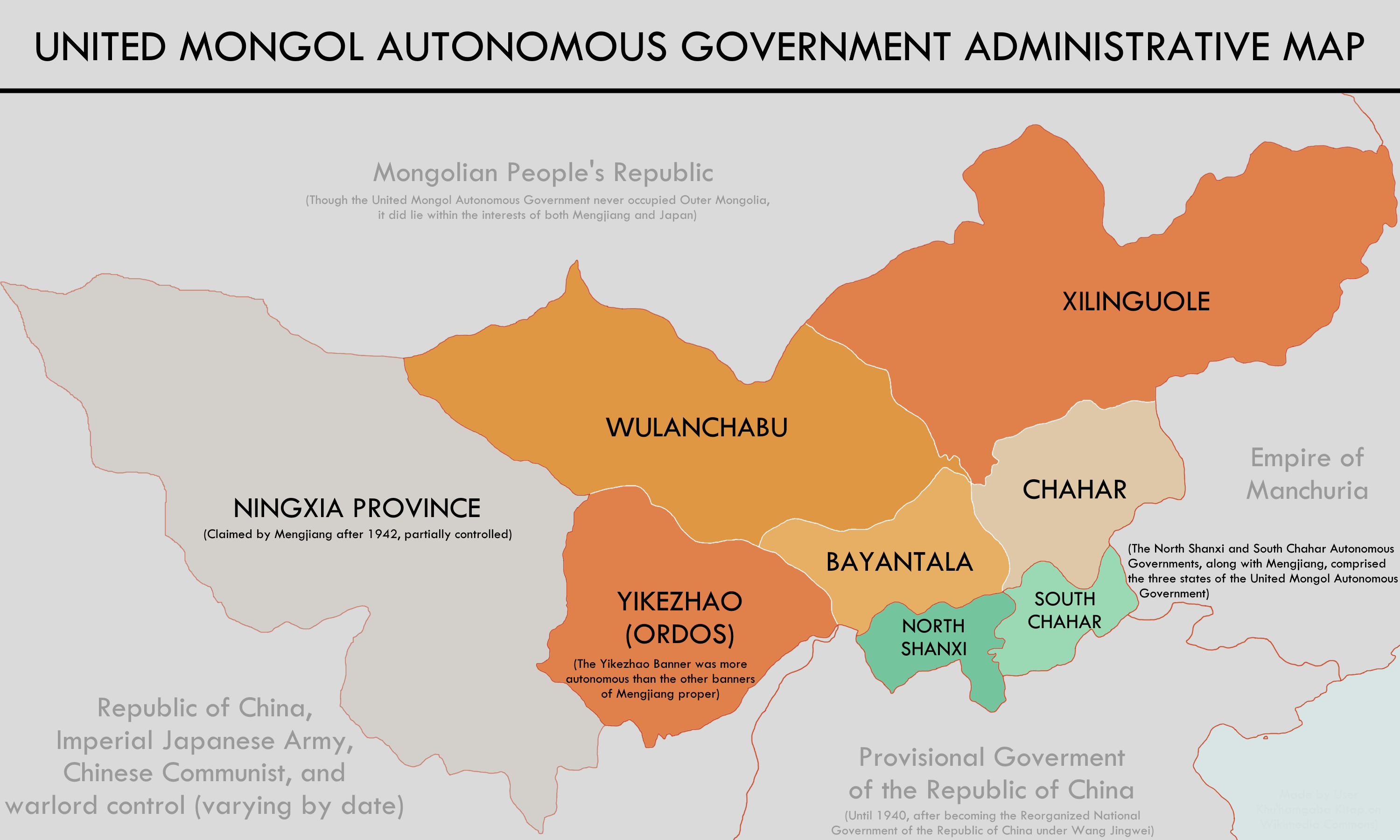
- A map of the United Mongol Autonomous Government featuring the state
- Status: administratively autonomous component of Mengjiang
- Capital: Kalgan
- Common languages: Chinese; Mongolian; Japanese
- Government: Military dictatorship
- Supreme Committee members
  - 1937–1939: Yu Pinqing and Du Yunyu
- Chief Adviser
  - 1937–1939: Motohei Takuchi
- Historical era: Second Sino-Japanese War; World War II
  - Kalgan captured: 27 August 1937
  - Established: 4 September 1937
  - Part of Mengjiang: 1 September 1939

Population
- 2,000,000
- Currency: Mengjiang yuan
Preceded by	Succeeded by
Republic of China	Mengjiang
- Today part of: China

South Chahar Autonomous Government
- Chinese: 察南自治政府
Transcriptions
Standard Mandarin
- Hanyu Pinyin: Chá nán zìzhì zhèngfǔ
- Wade–Giles: ch'a nan tzu chih cheng fu

The South Chahar Autonomous Government was an administratively autonomous component of Mengjiang from its creation in 1937 to its complete merger in 1939. Following the Japanese invasion of China in July 1937, regional governments were established in Japanese-occupied territories. After Operation Chahar in September 1937, which extended Japanese control to northern Shanxi region, more formal control of the area was established through the creation of the North Shanxi Autonomous Government, as well as the South Chahar Autonomous Government to the east of Shanxi.

== History ==
On August 27, 1937, the Kwantung Army occupied Kalgan, the capital of the Chahar Province of the Republic of China. Sir Yu Pinqing, who was an executive member of the Zhangjiakou Shokai, was invited by the Japanese Army and appointed as a member of the Zhangjiaguchi Security Maintenance Committee based there. On September 4, the South Chahar Autonomous Government was established by the Zhangjiakou Security Maintenance Association. Kalgan was chosen as the capital (since it already functioned as a provisional one), and 10 prefectures in the southern part of Chahar Province (Xuanhua County, Wanquan County, Huai'an County, Zhuolu County, Yu County, Yangyuan County, Chicheng County, Ryuseki County, Enkei County, Huailai County) were absorbed into it.

In addition to the South Chahar Autonomous Government, the Mongol United Autonomous Government and the North Shanxi Autonomous Government were established in the Mengjiang area at the same time. These three autonomous governments established the Mongolian Union Committee to facilitate each other's integration. However, this committee did not function well. Therefore, in September 1939, the three governments were merged into the newly established Mengjiang United Autonomous Government. At the same time, the South Chahar Autonomous Government was reorganized as the South Chahar Government Office and incorporated into the administrative divisions of the new government, and the South Chahar's Government Office was renamed to the Ministry of Xuanhua in 1943.

== Politics ==
In the South Chahar Autonomous Government, two supreme members elected from the political affairs committee played the role of administrative leaders. In addition, there were departments of the General Affairs Office, the Civil Affairs Agency, the Finance Agency, the National Safety Agency, and the Civil Affairs Agency, and the director was appointed as the head of each department. In addition, Japanese people were dispatched to each department of the autonomous government as advisors so that they could interfere with the country's administration, further solidifying the country's status as a Japanese puppet state.

=== People ===
The key people in the Chahar government were as follows:

- Chief Advisor: Motohei Takuchi
- Supreme Committee members: Yu Pinqing, Du Yunyu
- Committee members: Yu Pinqing, Du Yunyu, Ruan Zinan, Bai Kuixiang, Shi Yuanzhi, Han Yun, Zheng Renzhai, Han Yufeng
- Manager of General Affairs: Chen Yuming
- Director of the Agency of Civil Affairs: Chen Yuming or Lu Jingru
- Director of the Finance Agency: Yang Jinsheng
- Director of the National Safety Agency: Kazuya Takaki

== See also ==
- Mengjiang
- Japanese imperialism
- North Shanxi Autonomous Government
