= Wajin =

Wajin may refer to:

- Wajin (和人): Yamato people
- Wajin (倭人): Wajin (ancient people)
