= Flag of China (disambiguation) =

The flag of China is a red field charged in the canton (upper corner nearest the flagpole) with five golden stars.

Flag of China may also refer to:

- Flag of the Qing dynasty
- Flag of the Republic of China
- Flags of the Reorganized National Government of China

== See also ==
- Chinese Taipei Olympic flag
- List of Chinese flags
- Flag of Hong Kong
- Flag of Macau
