= Hui nationality =

The Hui nationality refers to two different ethnic classifications used in China's history

- One of the Five Races Under One Union under which all Muslims by religion were grouped, regardless of race, under the Republic of China, no longer in use
- Hui people, the current designation for Chinese language speaking people descended from foreign Muslims, who may or may not be practicing the religion of Islam, as recognized by the People's Republic of China
