= Flag of Wang Jingwei regime =

National Flag of the Reorganized National Government of China
- Use: Civil and state flag
- Proportion: 2:3
- Adopted: 1940
- Relinquished: 1943
- Design: Flag of Republic of China with yellow pennant writing "Peace, Anti-Communism, National Construction" (和平反共建國)
- Use: Civil and state flag
- Proportion: 2:3
- Adopted: 1943
- Design: Flag of Republic of China without yellow pennant

During the Second Sino-Japanese War, the invading Empire of Japan established a variety of puppet governments such as the Provisional Government of China and the Reformed Government of China which used the flag of Five Races Under One Union even though the legitimate Chinese Government had switched to the current day modern flag of the Republic of China.

When the Wang Jingwei regime was established on 30 March 1940 in Nanjing, Wang Jingwei was slated to take over the previous Japanese-installed governments and centralize the Chinese nationalists under what they claimed to be the legitimate successor to the Republic of China. He demanded to use the modern flag as a means to challenge the authority of the Chongqing government under Chiang Kai-shek and position himself as the rightful successor to Sun Yat-sen.

The Japanese, however, preferred the five-colored Five Races Under One Union flag. As a compromise, the Japanese suggested adding a triangular yellow pennant on top with the slogan "Peace, National Construction" (和平建國, Hépíng jiàn guó) in black, but this was initially rejected by Wang and Zhou Fohai, the latter calling it a "pig's tail". Because of this deadlock, Chinese collaborator-run institutions sometimes refused to fly the pennant while Japanese-run institutions sometimes flew the five-barred flag. In the end, Wang and the Japanese agreed to use the white sun flag, with the yellow banner to be used outdoors only. The slogan was also later expanded to "Peace, Anti-Communism, National Construction" (和平反共建國, Hépíng fǎn'gòng jiàn guó) until 1943 when the banner was abandoned, leaving two rival governments with the same flag and each claiming to be the legitimate government of China.

== Variants of the state flag ==
The Chinese characters read: Peace and Anticommunism (和平反共).

The Chinese characters read: Peace and National construction (和平建國).

There were multiple variants of the pendent used by the Wang Jingwei Government, these variants were based on regional choice.

== Naval jack and naval ensign ==
Naval jack from 1940 until 1945.

Naval ensign from 1 May 1942 until 1945.

The war ensign was adopted in commemoration of the second anniversary that the capital was relocated on the 1 May 1942.

== Gallery ==
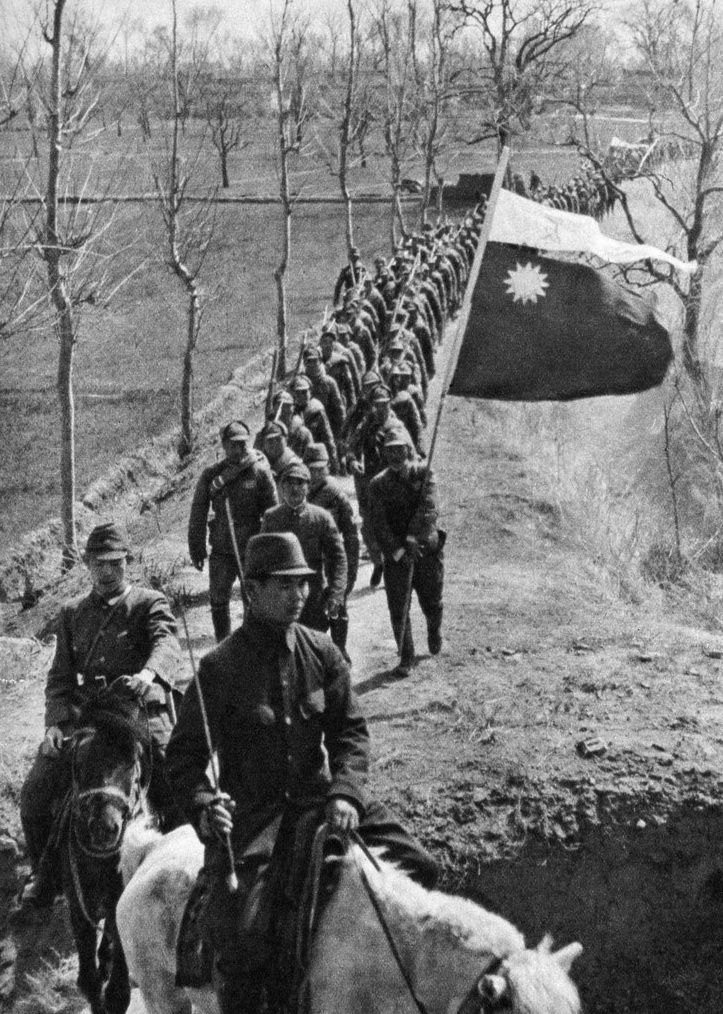
The flag being carried by soldiers.

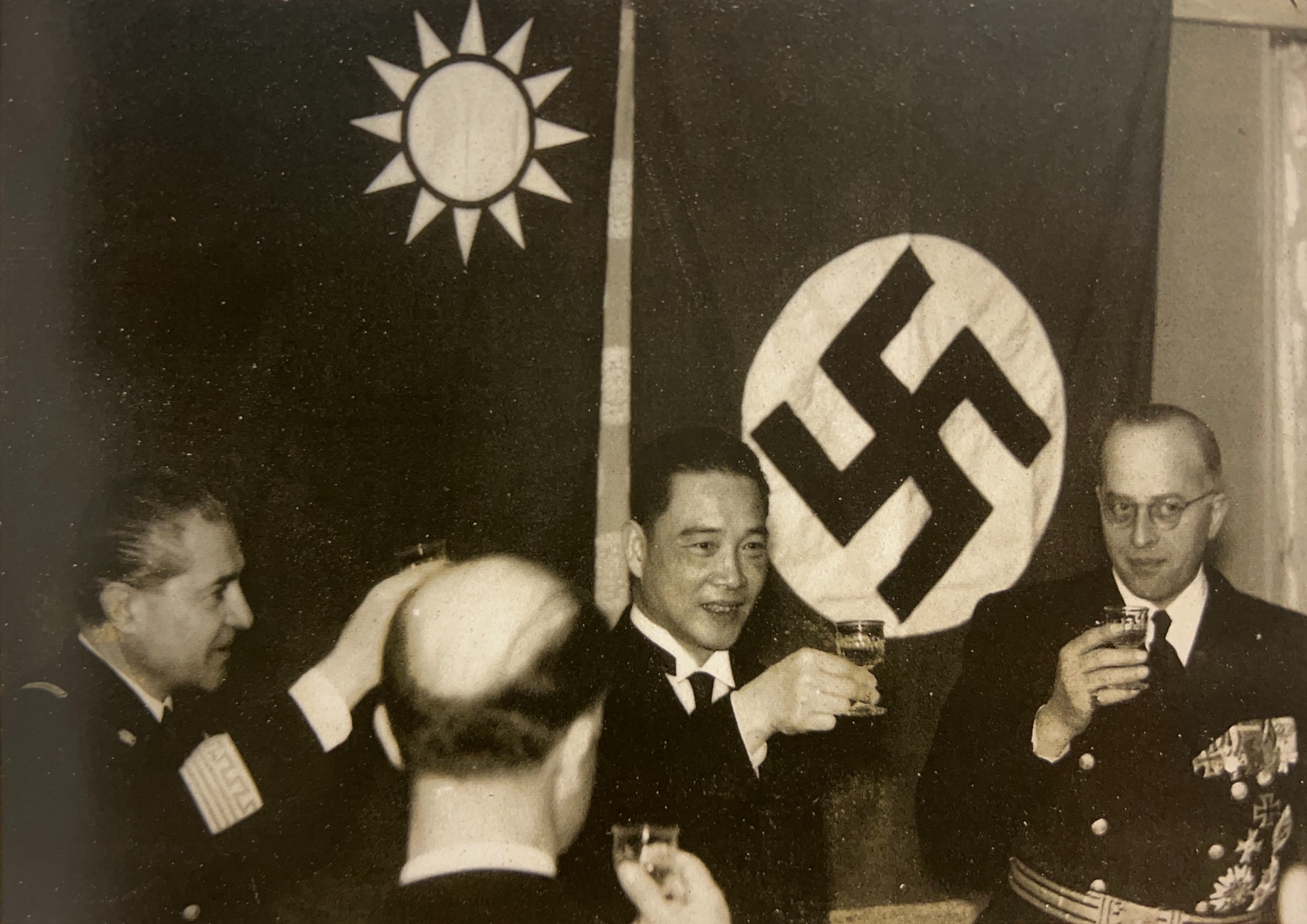
The flag used indoors next to the flag of Nazi Germany in a state banquet.

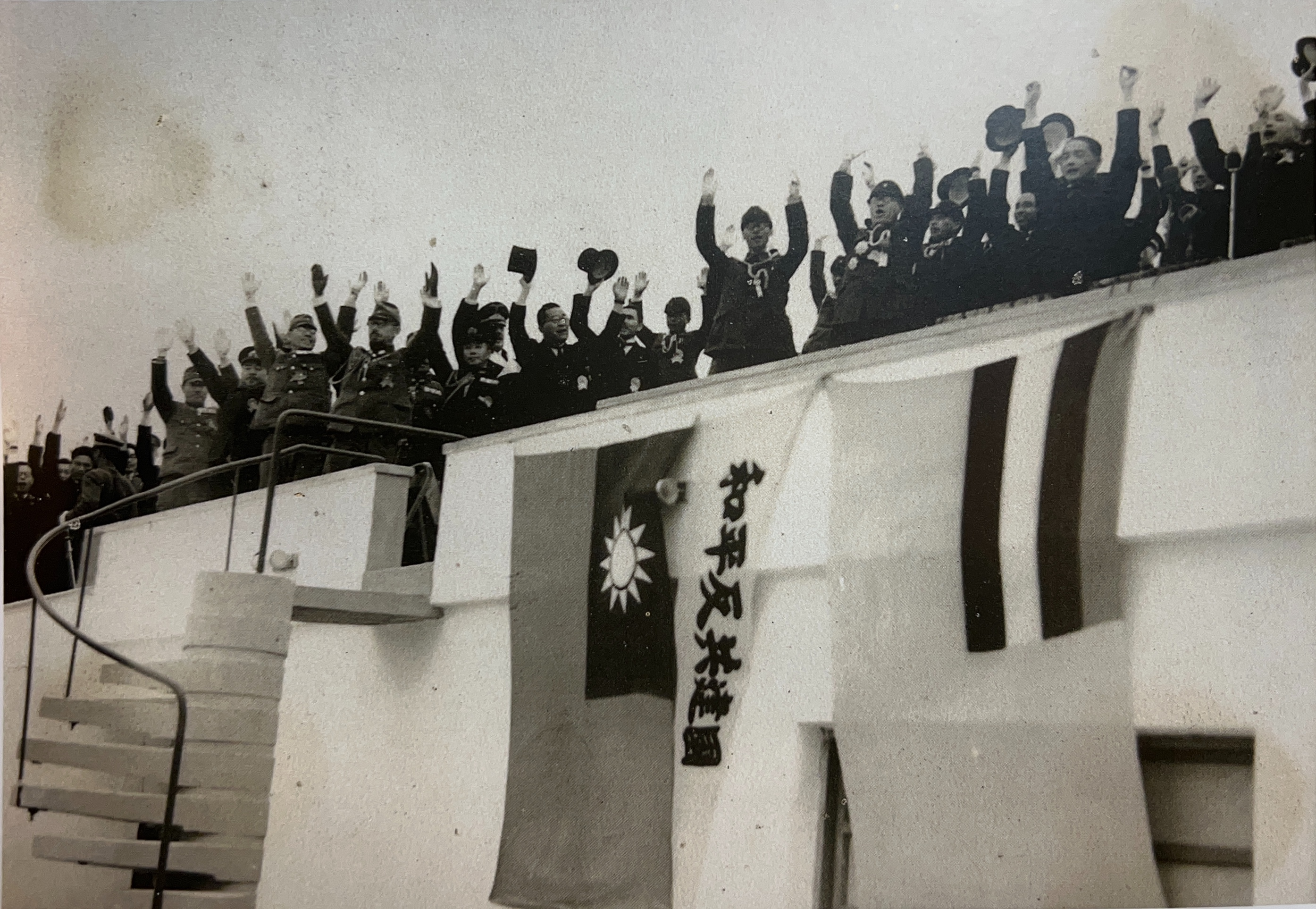
The flag used outdoors next to the flag of Manchukuo during a welcoming ceremony in Manchukuo.

== See also ==
- Five Races Under One Union
- Blue Sky with a White Sun
- Flag of the Republic of China
- Flag of the People's Republic of China
- Flag of Mengjiang
- Collaborationist Chinese Army
- List of Chinese flags
