= Yayoi people =

Ancestors of the Japanese people

Yayoi
弥生人
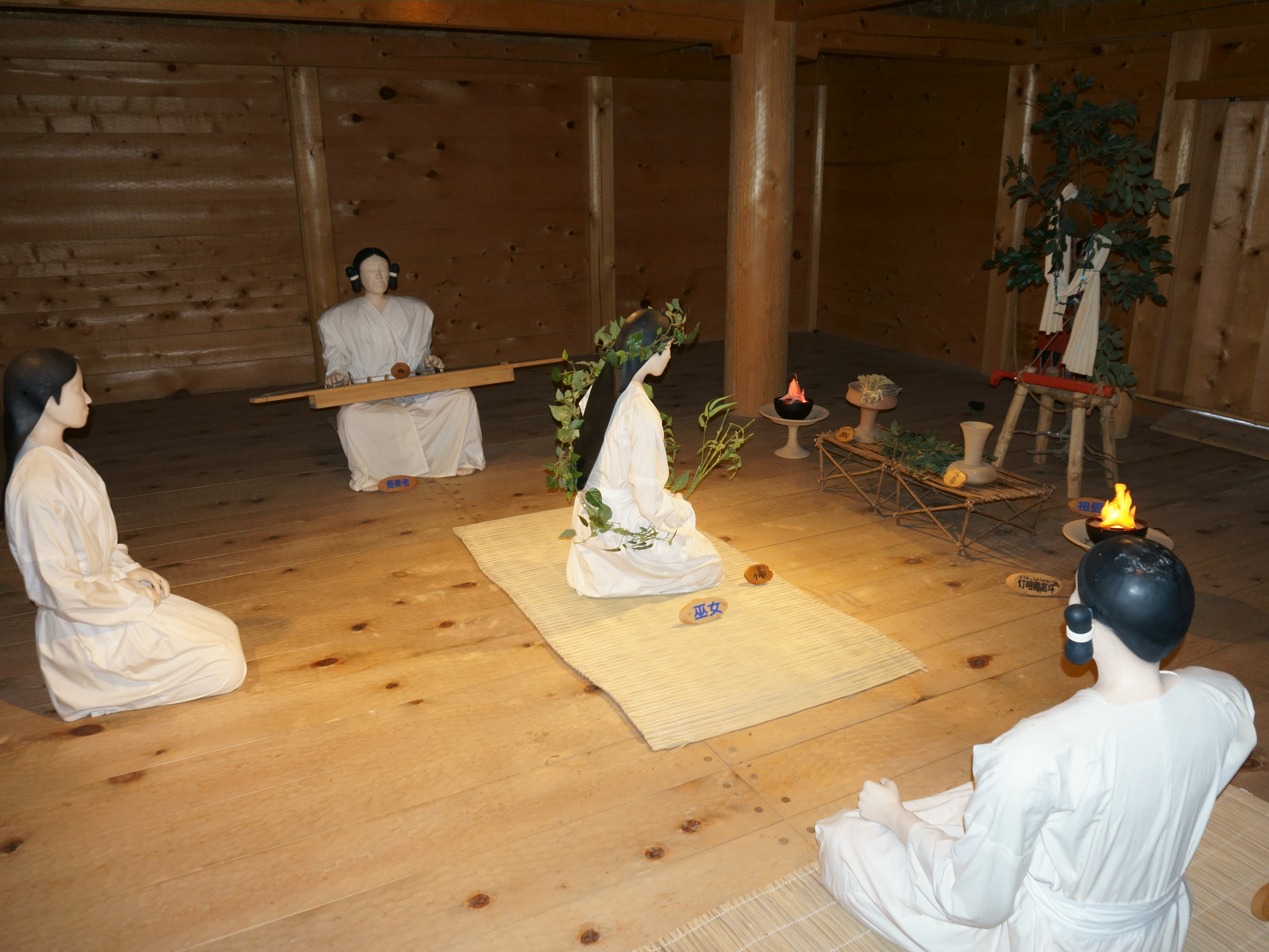
- Yayoi period ritual

Regions with significant populations
- Japanese archipelago, possibly central and southern parts of the Korean peninsula

Languages
- Proto-Japonic

Religion
- Shamanism

Related ethnic groups
- possibly the Samhan people

The Yayoi people (弥生人, Yayoi-jin) were an ancient people who immigrated to the Japanese archipelago during the Yayoi period (300 BCE–300 CE) and are characterized by the existence of Yayoi material culture. Some argue for an earlier start of the Yayoi period, between 1000 and 800 BCE, but this date is contested.

== Classification ==
The terms Yayoi and Wajin can be used interchangeably, though Wajin (倭人) refers to the people of Wa, and Wajin (和人) is also used as a name for the modern Yamato people.

The definition of the Yayoi people is complex: Yayoi describes both farmer-hunter-gatherers exclusively living in the Japanese archipelago and their agricultural transition. Yayoi people refers specifically to the mixed descendants of Jōmon hunter-gatherers and mainland Asian migrants, who adopted rice agriculture and other continental material culture. It is believed that rice farming spread to Japan from the Yangtze River Delta to the Shandong peninsula, then to the Liaodong peninsula, and finally to the Korean peninsula from where it was directly introduced to the Japanese archipelago. The immigration of early rice farmers into Japan coincided with a range of sociopolitical transformations occurring in East Asia, beginning with the eastward expansion of the Shang dynasty (1600–1400 BCE) and culminating in the spread of the Mumun culture (1500–300 BCE).

Archaeological research defines the term "Yayoi people" as a general designation for migrants who arrived in the Japanese archipelago during the Yayoi period, originating primarily from the Korean peninsula and southern Pacific regions. It is not used to indicate a single, specific ethnic group.

These migrants are believed to have gradually assimilated with the indigenous Jōmon population, who had long inhabited the archipelago, thereby contributing to the formation of the modern Japanese people.

The influence of Yayoi cultural elements varied by region. Populations in Kyushu, Okinawa, and the Tōhoku region are thought to retain stronger Jōmon traits, whereas those in Kansai and Shikoku exhibit a greater degree of Yayoi influence.

== Origin ==
There are several hypotheses about the geographic origin of the mainland Asian migrants:

- Immigrants from the southern or central Korean peninsula.
- Immigrants from Jiangnan near the Yangtze River Delta in ancient China.
- Multiple origins from various regions of Asia, mainly East and Southeast Asia.

According to Alexander Vovin, the Yayoi were present in the central and southern parts of Korea before they were displaced and assimilated by arriving proto-Koreans. A similar view was raised by Whitman (2012), who further noted that the Yayoi are not closely related to the proto-Koreanic speakers and that they arrived in Korea later from Manchuria around 300 BC and coexisted with proto-Japonic speakers. Both influenced each other, and a later founder effect diminished the internal variety of both language families.

Jared Diamond, the author of Guns, Germs, and Steel, suggested that immigrants from the Korean peninsula initiated the Yayoi period in Japan. Citing research findings, he stated that Yayoi Japan likely received millions of immigrants from Korea. These immigrants, during the Yayoi transition, are believed to have overwhelmed the genetic contribution of the indigenous Jōmon people, whose population was estimated to be around 75,000 at that time.

Overall, Japanese scholars suggest that most migrants to Japan from the Yayoi and Kofun periods (300 BC–538 AD) were from the Korean peninsula and that their impact was reflected through shared ancestry between the two modern populations.

== Lifestyle ==
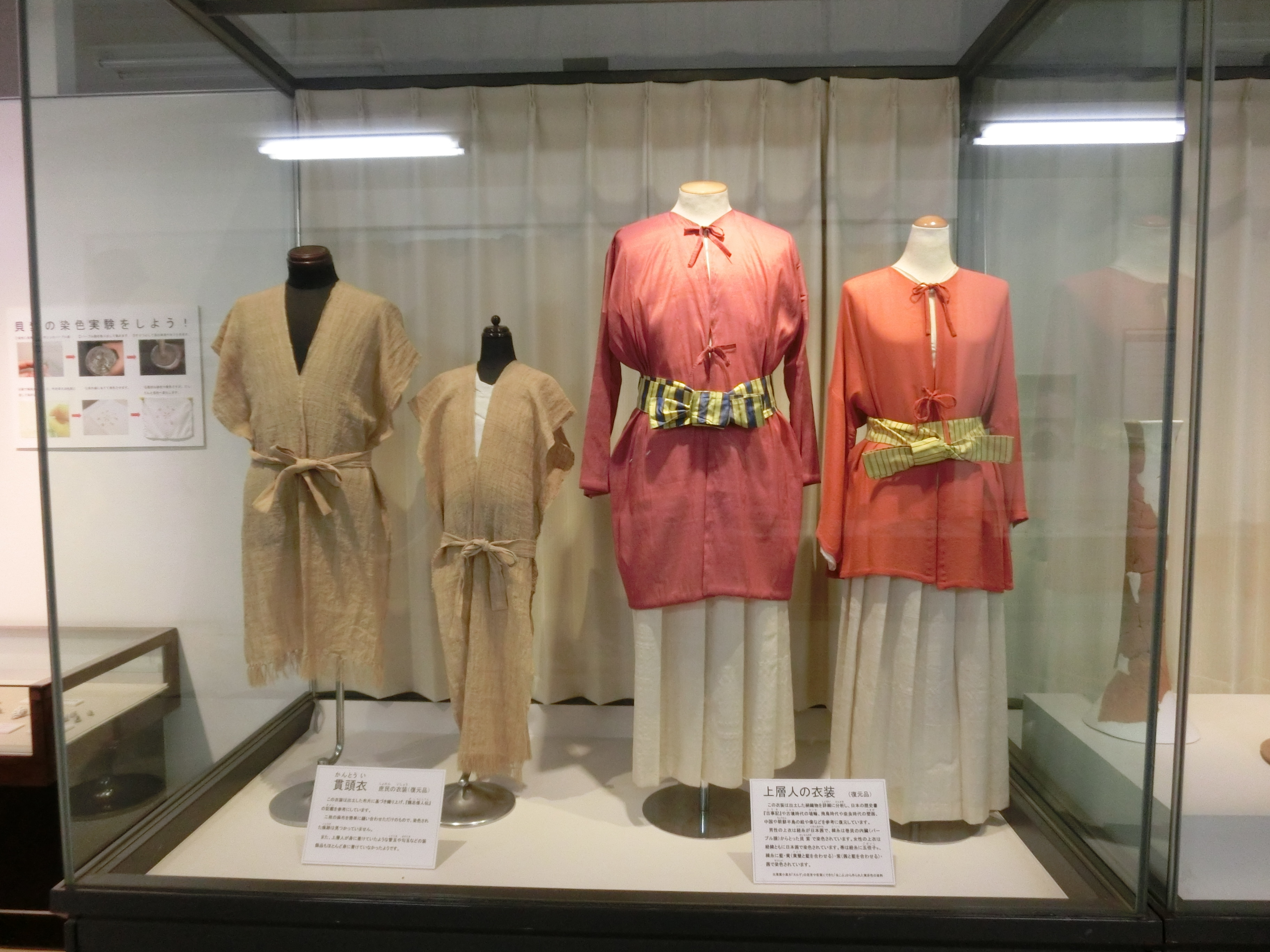
Yayoi attire

The Yayoi population is believed to have been heavily agricultural and shamanistic oriented, being thought to be the precursor of Shintoism, worshipping animals and spirits. Though the origins are still debated, the Yayoi group is believed to have been the people who first introduced rice farming to Japan.

According to ancient Chinese records pertaining to Korean nations, the people of Wa (Japan) and the inhabitants of the southern parts of the Korean peninsula had similar appearances.

The Book of Wei – Volume 30 notes that the people of the Jinhan confederacy (southeast Korea) had similar features with the people of Wa, a Yayoi period polity.

今辰韓人皆褊頭，男女近倭，亦文身。便步戰，兵仗與馬韓同。

"People of Jinhan have small heads, both men and women have tattoos on their bodies, similar to the people of Wa. They also fight on foot similar to the soldiers of Mahan."

— Book of Wei

The Book of the Later Han also states similar observations, commenting that the people of Jinhan being physically attractive and having tattoos like the people of Wa.

弁辰與辰韓雜居，城郭衣服皆同，言語風俗有異。其人形皆長大，美髮，衣服絜清。而刑法嚴峻。其國近倭，故頗有文身者。

"Byeonhan and Jinhan people live together with their clothes within the cities being the same. However, their customs and languages differ. They are tall, have beautiful hair, and wear neat clothes. They are also strict on laws. They are close to Wa and they all have tattoos."

— Book of the Later Han

The sources claim that the people of Jinhan, Byeonhan and Mahan, all possessed similar cultural attributes. This may hint at a singularity between the early inhabitants of Korea with the demographics of Yayoi period Japan.

== Language ==
The people of the Yayoi culture are regarded as the spreaders of agriculture and Japonic languages throughout the whole archipelago and had both local Jōmon hunter-gatherer and mainland Asian migrant ancestry. Kazuo Miyamoto^{[ja]} (宮本 一夫), a linguist and emeritus professor at Kyushu University posited that the Yayoi immigrants were related to the Mumun population of ancient Korea and that they introduced proto-Japonic languages when they entered the archipelago. This Mumun population adopted proto-Japonic languages from populations associated with the Gonggwiri type pottery in the northern Korean Peninsula at around 1500 BC, who in turn migrated to Korea through the eastern Liaoxi district or Liaohe basin in southern Manchuria at around 2700 BC.

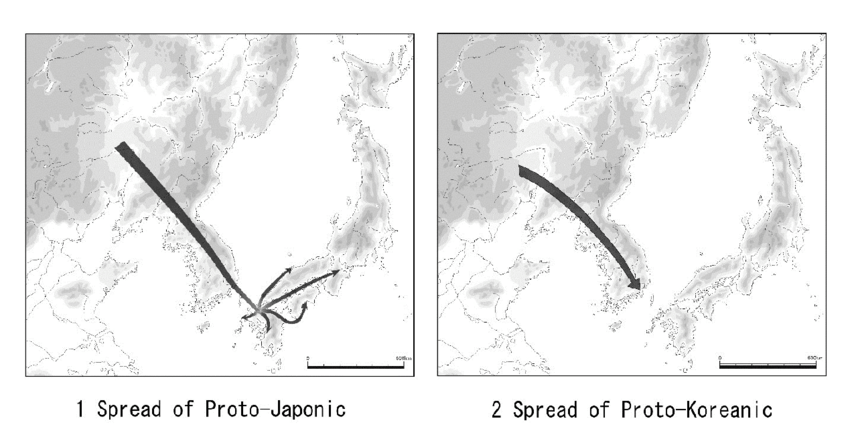
The migration routes of proto-Japonic and proto-Koreanic speakers. (2022)

The remnants of Japonic speakers in Korea are often categorized under the Peninsular Japonic demographic, most likely descendants of the Mumun–Yayoi groups that stayed on the peninsula until the proto-Koreanic speakers arrived and assimilated them. According to Miyamoto, this recent proto-Koreanic group though arriving later, had similar origins with the proto-Japonic group (in southern Manchuria) and heavily influenced the central Japanese language during the following Kofun and Asuka periods. In essence, Miyamoto proposed that modern Korean language is composed mainly of proto-Koreanic with proto-Japonic (Yayoi) influence, while modern Japanese language is composed mainly of proto-Japonic (Yayoi) with proto-Koreanic influence.

== Genetics ==
=== Overview ===
The Yayoi population is inferred to have been culturally close to the pre-Koreanic Mumun pottery period populations of the southern Korean peninsula, which may have been speakers of Peninsular Japonic languages. Genetically, the Yayoi population is often associated with the Y-Haplogroup O1b2 (SRY465, M176) ^{[ja]} which is commonly found in modern day Japanese and Korean populations. Anthropologically, they are considered to be genetically diverse and can be divided into three separate, but related groups: early-Yayoi (弥生初期), middle-Yayoi (弥生中期), and late-Yayoi (弥生後期) settlers. Although the groups all share the unique O1b2 ancestry, early-Yayoi period people possessed more Jōmon ancestry whereas the late-Yayoi settlers possessed more mainland Asian ancestry with the latter bearing heavy resemblance with ancient Koreans from the Three Kingdoms period.

Several studies show that the Yayoi individuals were genetically continuous with modern Japanese and Koreans. In particular, the Yayoi population derive their ancestry from a population that's ancestral to modern Koreans, who are characterized by a mixture of Siberian and Southeast Asian ancestries. The latter was introduced to Korea from Southern China after the Bronze Age and is described as a mixture of ancient Cambodian (Vat Konmou) and Vietnamese (Đông Sơn) ancestries. Among ancient populations, the Yayoi are closely related to Middle Neolithic individuals from Inner Mongolia, Miaozigou and the Haminmangha site and Early Neolithic individuals (Xiaojingshan and Boshan) from Shandong, China. Among modern populations, the Yayoi are related to Japanese, Koreans and Daur people. They also have ancestral components which peak in ancient Mongolians and Baikalians. According to Kim et al. (2024), the Yayoi have the highest genetic affinities to the ancient 'Korean_Ando (Antu)' population, who have Hongshan-related affinities, compared to other contemporary Korean populations, like those from Gunsan and Gimhae.

According to Ishiya et al. (2026), the Yayoi and Kofun populations received significant input from ancient Northeast Asians, especially Neolithic Mongolian populations or alternatively, from Middle Neolithic and Bronze Age West Liao River populations. But compared to Kofun populations, Yayoi populations show stronger genetic affinities to coastal East Eurasians, like those from Early to Late Neolithic Shandong and the Devil's Gate Cave, and Jōmon populations. Among modern populations, the Yayoi are closely related to Daur people. Other studies also detect Jōmon affinities in early Yayoi populations, especially towards Jōmon-like populations from the Nagabaka site in the Ryukyu Archipelago, indicating early admixture amongst Yayoi populations.

=== Impact on modern populations ===
Genetically, the Yayoi people (especially the late-Yayoi settlers) are believed to be the primary ancestral source for Japanese people and are believed to be the contributing factor for the diminishment of the previously dominant Jōmon ancestry, commonly associated with the mtDNA Haplogroup M7a ^{[ja]}. Today, modern Japanese people possess around an average of 9% (±3%) of Jōmon ancestry with the highest reaching around 12%. In comparison, Koreans possess more Yayoi ancestry than the Japanese, only carrying about 5% of Jōmon ancestry in total. According to a 2024 study, the Doigahama Yayoi individual, who is representative of the Yayoi population, already possessed substantial East Asian ancestry, similar to what’s observed in modern Japanese. They are also closely related to the succeeding Kofun population and modern Koreans. The study’s authors conclude that the peopling of Japan involved continuous migrations of Koreans, who possessed East Asian and Northeast Siberian ancestries, into Japan until the Kofun period.

== Physical appearance ==
Early Yayoi immigrants had often wholly large and flat features, large facial height, round eye orbits, and large teeth, while other early Yayoi specimens, such as those from the Shinmachi Dolmen Cluster displayed features closer to the earlier Jōmon people, such as a shorter face, short stature, and Jōmon-style tooth extraction. One Yayoi specimen reconstructed in 2025 did not display 'flat' features and instead, exhibited transitional features related to those found in Jōmon peoples. But they also possessed characteristics such as less prominent cheekbones and a longer face.

== Sea people ==
Some historians call the Yayoi people the "Sea people (海人族, Kaijinzoku or Amazoku, 海神族, Watatsumizoku)," postulating that they migrated to Japan via the sea from elsewhere. This idea began with finding Kara-styled bronzewares and shipwreck remains on the coasts of the Korean peninsula, prompting some historians to suggest that there was a group of seafaring people who entered Japan via Korea from the seas during the Yayoi period.

Multiple theories about their geographic origin exist, including the Korean peninsula, Southeast Asia, and South China. However, the theory of the Sea people is deemed merely hypothetical due to lack of evidence, and support for it has diminished over the years in favor of more grounded descriptions in terms of the Yayoi people.

== See also ==
- Japanese people
- Yayoi culture
- Doigahama Site
