= Doigahama Site =

Yayoi period cemetery in Shimonoseki, Yamaguchi, Japan

Doigahama site
- 土井ヶ浜遺跡 (Japanese)
- Doigahama Doigahama Site (Japan)
- 34°17′36.7″N 130°53′10.4″E
- Type: Settlement trace
- Periods: Yayoi period
- Location: Shimonoseki, Yamaguchi, Japan
- Region: San'yō region

Site notes
- Public access: Yes (park, museum )
- National Historic Site of Japan

The Doigahama Site (土井ヶ浜遺跡, Doigahama iseki) is an archaeological site with a Yayoi period necropolis located in the Kandakami, Toyohoku-cho neighborhood of the city of Shimonoseki, Yamaguchi Prefecture, in the San'yō region of Japan. It was designated a National Historic Site in 1962.

== Overview ==
The Doigahama site is located in the center of the small plain on the coast of Hibiki Bay, where aeolian sand dunes form perpendicular to the coastline. In the late autumn of 1930 a teacher at Jindama Elementary School discovered a sarcophagus containing six human remains that had become exposed by drifting of the sand dunes. In March 1931, these bones were the subject of an academic report issued by Kyoto Imperial University, but further investigation was limited due to lack of funds, and later by World War II. After the war, additional bones and pottery fragments were brought to the Kyushu University School of Medicine and subsequently a full-scale archaeological excavation was carried out over five years under the cooperation of the Science Council of Japan and the Archaeological Society of Japan. The site was found to be a Yayoi period cemetery extending along the narrow ridgeline of the sand dune about 300 meters from the coast. The site covered an area approximately 120 meters east–west and about 40 meters north–south, with burials from the early Yayoi period in the east and middle Yayoi period in the west.

As a result of 10 rounds of excavations, from 1953 to 1956 and from 1980 to 1985, more than 240 sets of human remains were unearthed. The lime content of seashells mixed in the sand is suitable for preserving the calcium content of bones, and human bones are well preserved. In most of the burials the bodies were lying on their backs and orientated to the east, with hands together at the chest, legs slightly bent and ankles tied; however there are also a few cases of burials lying face down. Some bodies were buried in the sand without burial facilities, some were buried with gravel at the four corners, and a few were buried in stone enclosures or box-type sarcophagi. Grave goods such as jasper and glass magatama and round beads, shell bracelets, and rings have also been discovered, as well as Yayoi pottery. Many of the skulls showed evidence of tooth ablation.

The site attracted considerable anthropological attention, as the acidic soil of Japan makes finds of ancient human remains difficult. The characteristics of the excavated human bones confirmed that the people of the Yayoi period were racially different from the earlier Jōmon period inhabitants of the area, with a taller stature (averaging 163-cm) and with longer faces. This lent evidence to the theory that the Yayoi were later immigrants who came to the Japanese archipelago from mainland Asia together with the technology for rice cultivation.

Two of the burials in the cemetery were found to be unusual. During the 1958 excavation, the bones of a middle-aged woman were found with the bones of a cormorant on her chest. It is known that the people of the Yayoi period thought of birds as messengers to mediate between the gods and the human world. From this, it is presumed that this was the grave of a female shaman with special psychic abilities. The second unusual grave was dubbed the "warrior's grave" and was found in the 1954 excavation. This was the grave of an adult man with a good physique, who had fifteen stone arrowheads driven into bones from chest to its waistline. It is believed that he was struck at point-blank range and speculated that he was a warrior who fought to protect the village at Doigahama. He was wearing a bracelet made from a Sinustrombus latissimus shell, which is found only in the South Pacific. This has also been the subject of speculation as to the possible connections between the Yayoi people and the Austronesian peoples of Oceania.

In recent times, the Yayoi human bones excavated from the site were analyzed through whole genome sequencing (WGS) and found that most migrants migrated from the Korean Peninsula during the Yayoi and Kofun periods (300 BC–538 AD), assimilated with the native Jōmon people to create an ancestral group leading to modern Japanese.

The site is now open to the public, and includes the "Doigahama Dome", where 80 sets of human remains have been preserved as they were excavated, and the Doigahama Site Anthropological Museum.

== See also ==
- Jōmon people
- Yayoi people
- List of Historic Sites of Japan (Yamaguchi)
