= Five Races Under One Union =

Political principle of the Republic of China

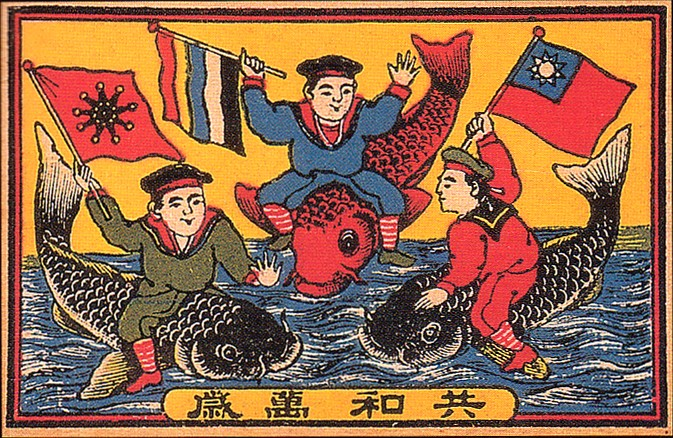
- The center flag is the Five-Colored Flag of the Republic of China. Underneath the three flags is the message: "Long live the union" (共和萬歲).
- Chinese: 五族共和
- Literal meaning: five-race republic
Transcriptions
Standard Mandarin
- Hanyu Pinyin: wǔzú gònghé
- Wade–Giles: wǔ-tsú kùng-hé
- Yale Romanization: wǔdzú gùnghé
- IPA: [ùtsǔ kʊ̂ŋxɤ̌]
Yue: Cantonese
- Yale Romanization: ngh juhk guhng wòh
- Jyutping: ng5 zuk6 gung6 wo4
- IPA: [ŋ̬̍ tsʊ̀k kʊ̀ŋ wɔ̏ː]
Southern Min
- Hokkien POJ: gō͘ cho̍k kiōng-hô

Five Races Under One Union (Note: 五族共和 has also been translated into English as follows: Five-race Republic; Five Nation[s] Under One Union; Five-nation Republic) was one of the major principles upon which the Republic of China was founded following the 1911 Revolution. Its central tenet was the harmonious existence under one nation of what were considered the five major ethnic groups in China: the Han, the Manchu, the Mongols, the Hui (Muslims), and the Tibetans.

Republic of China
- "Five-Colored Flag" (五色旗; Wǔsèqí)
- Use: Civil and state flag
- Proportion: 5∶8
- Adopted: 10 January 1912
- Relinquished: 29 December 1928
- Design: Five horizontal bands of red, yellow, blue, white and black.

== Description ==
This principle emphasized harmony between what were considered the five major ethnic groups in China, as represented by the colored stripes of the Five-Colored Flag of the Republic: the Han (red); the Manchus (yellow); the Mongols (blue); the Hui or Muslims (white); and the Tibetans (black).

The term "Hui" (回) here refers to all Muslims (回民) in China as a whole regardless of ethnicity, including Chinese-speaking Muslims, Turkic-speaking Uyghurs, Kazakhs, Uzbeks, Kyrgyzs and Tatars, Mongolic-speaking Dongxiangs and Bonans, and Iranic-speaking Pamiris, etc. The term "Muslim Territory" (回疆; Huíjiāng) was an older name for Xinjiang during the Qing dynasty. It was only after the establishment of the People's Republic of China that the term "Hui" started to refer specifically to Chinese-speaking Muslims.

| Color scheme | Red | Yellow | Blue | White | Black |
|---|---|---|---|---|---|
| Pantone | 2347 C | 7548 C | 307 C | White Color | Black Color |
| CMYK | 0–88-92–13 | 0–22-100–0 | 99–37-0–38 | 0–0-0–0 | 0–0-0–100 |
| HEX | #DF1B12 | #FFC600 | #02639D | #FFFFFF | #000000 |
| RGB | 223–27-18 | 255-198-0 | 2–99-157 | 255-255-255 | 0–0-0 |
| Chinese ethnic group represented | Han | Manchus | Mongols | Muslims | Tibetans |

== History ==
Records from the Sui dynasty show a system of military banners using the five colors to represent the Five Elements: red for fire, yellow for earth, blue for wood, white for metal, and black for water. The Tang dynasty inherited this system, and has arranged the colors in a united flag according to the above order of the elements, for military use. During the Liao and Song periods, paintings depict the Khitan people using the same flag design. During the reign of the Mongol Yuan dynasty the five colors began to symbolize ethnicities (五色四夷) in a multi-ethnic state. In later historical periods, this "flag of the five united elements" was altered and re-adapted for military and official uses. A Qing-era painting depicting the victory of the Banners over the Muslim Du Wenxiu rebellion in Yunnan, includes a Qing military flag with the five elements arranged in the order of yellow, white, black, green and red.

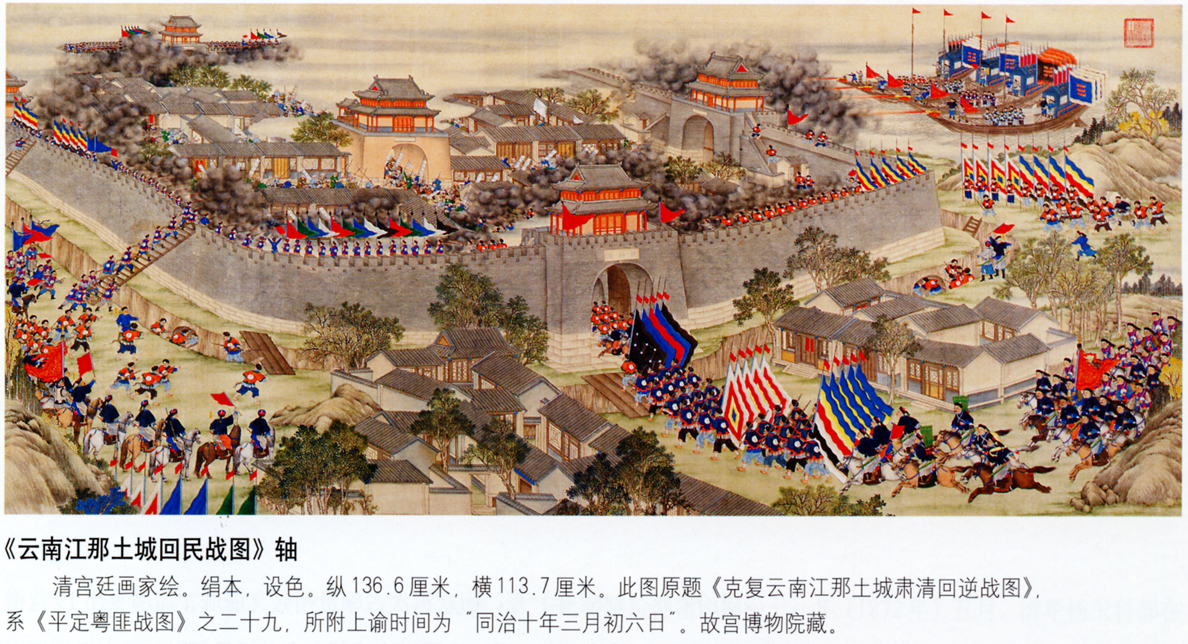
Painting of the Qing army facing the Panthay Rebellion in Yunnan. The Qing military used a five-color flag.

Among the rhetorical strategies of the Xinhai revolutionaries was to characterize the Qing dynasty as complicit in foreign domination of the Chinese nation because the Qing were ethnic Manchus. After the Wuchang uprising, the Qing dynasty was replaced by the Republic of China. On 1 January 1912, during the Republic of China presidential inauguration, Sun Yat-sen mentioned the idea "Five Race Under One Union." He claims that the people are the core of a nation, and that uniting Han, Manchus, Mongols, Hui, and Tibetans as a country is to unite them all as one people.

Prior to the adoption of the five-colored flag by the Republic, several different flags were promoted by the revolutionaries. For example, the military units of Wuchang wanted a 9-star flag featuring a taijitu, while Sun Yat-sen preferred the Blue Sky and White Sun flag to honor Lu Haodong.

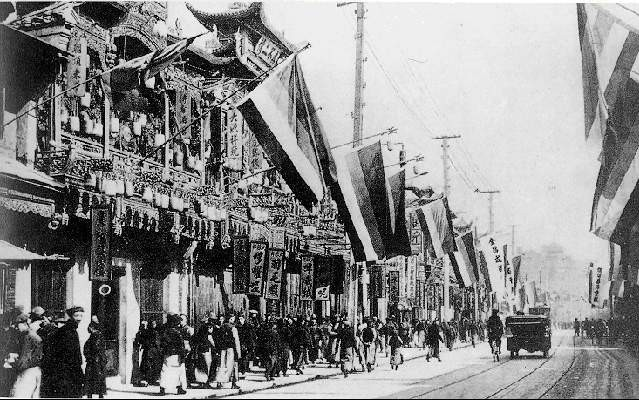
The Nanjing Road following the Shanghai Uprising, with the Five Races Under One Union flags used by the revolutionaries on display

Despite the uprisings targeting a Manchu-dominated regime, Sun Yat-sen, Song Jiaoren and Huang Xing unanimously advocated racial integration, which was symbolized by the five-color flag. They promoted a view of the non-Han ethnicities as also being Chinese, despite their being a relatively small percentage of the population. However, while Sun Yat-sen advocated for racial integration, he believes that the five-color flag, despite claiming the five race as equal, arranges the color from top to bottom, suggesting hierarchy.

The "five ethnic groups under one union" flag was no longer used after the Northern Expedition ended in 1928, which saw the Kuomintang-led Nationalist government overthrow the Beiyang government.

A variation of this flag was adopted by Yuan Shikai's empire and the Japanese puppet state of Manchukuo. In Manchukuo, a similar slogan was used, but the five races it represented were the Yamato (Japanese) (red), Han (blue), Mongols (white), Koreans (black) and Manchus (yellow). Some of its own variations also made the yellow more prominent, rather than display each color equally.

During the Second Sino-Japanese War, the flag was used by several Japanese puppet governments, including the Provisional Government of the Republic of China in the northern part of the country and the Reformed Government of the Republic of China in Central China.

The Japanese puppet states and autonomous regions in Inner Mongolia also used variants on the flag, this time with four colours: red for the Japanese, blue for the Mongols, yellow for the Han and white for the Hui; black was not used, as the region did not have significant Korean or Tibetan populations.

== Gallery ==
=== China ===
Flag of the Admiral of the Beiyang Fleet, 1890–1909

Flag of the Commander of Minelayers of the Beiyang Fleet, 1890–1909

Flag of the Provincial Commander-in-Chief of the Beiyang Fleet, 1905–1909

National flag of the Republic of China, 1912–1928 (Note: Used again by the East Hebei Autonomous Government (1935–1938), the Provisional Government (1937–1940), and the Reformed Government (1938–1940))

Beiyang Army insignia, 1912–1928

National flag of the Empire of China, 1915–1916

Variant flag of the Empire of China, 1916

Air force roundel, 1920–1921

Reformed Government Army insignia, 1938–1940

One of the proposed national flags of the People's Republic of China, August 1949

=== Manchukuo ===
Manchuria Aviation Company roundel, 1932–1945

National flag of Manchukuo, 1932–1945

War ensign of Manchukuo, 1932–1945

Manchukuo Army insignia, 1932–1945

Manchukuo Air Force roundel, 1938–1945

=== Inner Mongolia ("four races") ===
Mongol Military Government banner, 1936–1939

South Chahar Autonomous Government banner, 1937–1939

North Shanxi Autonomous Government banner, 1937–1939

Flag of Mengjiang, 1939–1945

== See also ==
- Buddhist flag
- Multiracialism
- Legacy of the Qing dynasty
- Zhonghua minzu

== Sources ==
- Gladney, Dru C. (1996). Muslim Chinese: Ethnic Nationalism in the People's Republic (2nd ed.). Harvard University Asia Center. ISBN 0-674-59497-5. (1st edition appeared in 1991)
- Lipman, Jonathan Neaman (1997). Familiar Strangers: A History of Muslims in Northwest China. University of Washington Press. ISBN 978-029-597-644-0.
