= Lu Haodong =

Chinese revolutionary (1868–1895)

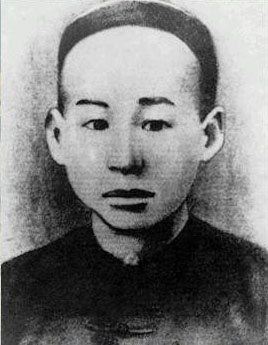
- Lu Haodong in his younger days
- Born: Lu Zhonggui; 30 September 1868; Shanghai, Qing China
- Died: 7 November 1895 (aged 27); Foshan, Guangdong, Qing China
- Cause of death: Execution
- Other name: Xianxiang (courtesy name)

Chinese name
- Traditional Chinese: 陸皓東
- Simplified Chinese: 陆皓东
Transcriptions
Standard Mandarin
- Hanyu Pinyin: Lù Hàodōng
- Wade–Giles: Lu Hao-tung

Lu Zhonggui (birth name)
- Traditional Chinese: 陸中桂
- Simplified Chinese: 陆中桂
Transcriptions
Standard Mandarin
- Hanyu Pinyin: Lù Zhōngguì

Xianxiang (courtesy name)
- Traditional Chinese: 獻香
- Simplified Chinese: 献香
Transcriptions
Standard Mandarin
- Hanyu Pinyin: Xiànxiāng
- Wade–Giles: Hsien-hsiang

Lu Zhonggui (30 September 1868 – 7 November 1895), courtesy name Xianxiang, better known by his art name Lu Haodong, was a Chinese revolutionary who lived in the late Qing dynasty. He is best known for designing the Blue Sky with a White Sun flag that became the party flag and emblem of the Kuomintang (KMT; Chinese Nationalist Party), and the canton of the flag of the Republic of China.

== Life ==
Lu was born in Shanghai but his ancestral home was in Xiangshan County (now is Zhongshan), Guangdong. He was a friend of Sun Yat-sen and was involved in activities targeted at overthrowing the Qing dynasty and establishing a republic in China. In 1895, Lu co-founded the Revive China Society in Hong Kong with Sun Yat-sen. In October 1895, they planned to stage an uprising in Guangzhou, but the Qing government got wind of their plan. On 26 October, Lu was preparing to escape from Guangzhou, but decided to return to their base of operations in a church in present-day Beijinglu, Yuexiu District to burn a roster containing the names of the revolutionaries and other important documents. He could not escape in time and was arrested along with other revolutionaries by the Qing government.

Lu was taken to the yamen in Nanhai County (present-day Nanhai District, Foshan, Guangdong) for interrogation by the county magistrate Li Zhengyong (李徵庸), who was acting under instructions from Tan Zhonglin (譚鍾麟), the Viceroy of Liangguang. When he refused to kneel down before Li during questioning, the magistrate said, "You are a talented young man. Why did you want to get yourself in trouble that would cost you your life? I feel sorry for you that you don't value your life." Lu replied sternly, "China is a vast country and it has the highest population in the world, but it is poor and weak because the Qing government is authoritarian and incompetent in foreign policy. My comrades and I originally planned an uprising with the aim of overthrowing the Qing government and replacing it with a new republican government. I intended to kill one or two persons like you who serve the Qing government. Now that our plan has failed, I can't kill you but you can kill me. What's there to feel sorry about?"

The American embassy in Guangzhou attempted to save Lu's life by claiming that he was a translator working at the telegraph office and was not a revolutionary. However, they could not do anything when Li Zhengyong showed them a confession written by Lu himself. Lu, Zhu Guiquan (朱貴全), Qiu Si (邱四) and other captured revolutionaries were executed on 7 November by the order of Tan Zhonglin. Sun Yat-sen called Lu "the first person in Chinese history who sacrificed his life for a democratic revolution".

Lu is credited for designing the Blue Sky with a White Sun flag that became the party flag and emblem of the Kuomintang (KMT; Chinese Nationalist Party), and the canton of the flag of the Republic of China.

== See also ==
- Blue Sky with a White Sun
- Kuomintang
- History of the Republic of China
- National Revolutionary Martyrs' Shrine
