= Wajin (ancient people) =

Ancient ethnic group

Wajin (倭人, Wajin; literally "Wa people") is

- in the narrow sense, the old name of the ethnic group of the Yayoi people who lived in the Japanese archipelago.
- In the wider sense, an ethnic group that was mainly active at sea between mainland China, the Korean Peninsula and the Japanese archipelago.

In general the Wajin that established themselves on the Japanese archipelago became the Yayoi people, the ancestors of the Yamato people. The word "Wajin" also refers to related groups outside of Japan. Later in the history, the Kanji 倭 (wa) has been altered to 和 (wa) and it is used to refer to the Japanese people (和人), particularly by Japan's indigenous Ainu people.

The first secure appearance of Wajin is in "Treatise on Geography" (地理志) of the Book of Han. After that, "Gishi Wajinden" (魏志倭人伝), a Japanese abbreviation for the "account of Wajin" in the "Biographies of the Wuhuan, Xianbei, and Dongyi" (烏丸鮮卑東夷傳), volume 30 of the Book of Wei of the Records of the Three Kingdoms, described their lifestyle, habits and the way of society.

Descriptions about Wajin can be found in the Old Book of Tang (945 AD) and the New Book of Tang (1060 AD).

Several linguists, including Alexander Vovin and Juha Janhunen, suggest that Japonic languages were spoken by Wajin and were present in large parts of the southern Korean Peninsula. According to Vovin, these "Peninsular Japonic languages" were replaced by Koreanic-speakers (possibly belonging to the Han-branch). This event was possibly the reason for the Yayoi-migration into Japan. Janhunen also suggests that early Baekje was still predominantly Japonic-speaking before they got replaced or assimilated into the new Korean society.

== Origin of the name ==
"Wa" (倭 was the Chinese name for Japan in ancient times, but the oldest source on its origin is a document written in the 200s by the Wei official Rujun (如淳), who argued that Wa was derived from the radical "man" and custom of "tattooing (委) on the face." This theory is also supported by many Japanese scholars, as the indigenous Ainu people of Japan have the custom of tattooing (sinuye).

== As Baiyue and Wu people ==
The ethnic concept of "Wa-zoku" (倭族, lit. "Wa people") encompasses a wide range of regions and does not limit to the Wajin of the Japanese archipelago. According to Kenzaburo's theory, Wa-zoku are Wajin who came to the Japanese archipelago with rice crops, whose ancestor was the same as the Yayoi people. Torigoe says that the original place of the Wa-zoku is Yunnan.

Suwa Haruo considered Wa-zoku to be part of Baiyue in southern China.

The Wajin (and the Yayoi) are possibly descendants of the Wu people. A large paddy ruins in the area was created around 450 BC, the Warring States period, in Kyushu, and a record states that "Wajin [were the] self-named descendants of Zhou". An influential theory states that the Wu people of the Yangtze River area that followed the hydroponic rice cultivation culture, which is also a symbol of Yangtze civilization, drifted to the Japanese archipelago around the 5th century BC, in collaboration with the destruction of the Kingdom of Wu.

== Sources ==
- Wada, Sei; Ishihara, Michihiro, eds. (November 1951). 魏志倭人伝・後漢書倭伝・宋書倭国伝・隋書倭国伝 [Accounts of the Wa (from the Records of the Three Kingdoms, Book of the Later Han, Book of Song, and Book of Sui)]. 岩波文庫 (in Japanese). 岩波書店. ASIN B000JBE2JU.
- Ishihara, Michihiro, ed. (1985). 魏志倭人伝・後漢書倭伝・ 宋書倭国伝・隋書倭国伝――中国正史日本伝1 [Accounts of the Wa in the Records of the Three Kingdoms (Wei), the Book of the Later Han, the Book of Song, and the Book of Sui — Accounts of Japan in Official Chinese Histories, Vol. 1]. Iwanami-bunko (in Japanese) (Shintei, dai 58 satsu hakkō ed.). Tōkyō: Iwanami-Shoten. ISBN 978-4-00-334011-0.
