= Flag of the Republic of China =

Republic of China (Taiwan)
- "Blue Sky, White Sun, and a Wholly Red Earth" (青天白日滿地紅)
- Use: Civil and state flag, national ensign
- Proportion: 2:3
- Adopted: 1895 (by Revive China Society, original version); 1906 (addition of the red field); 23 October 1911 (naval flag); 5 May 1921 (by Guangzhou government); 28 October 1928 (in mainland China); 25 October 1945 (in Taiwan); 24 October 1954 (standardized)
- Design: A red field with a navy blue canton bearing a white sun with 12 triangular rays
- Designed by: Lu Haodong (The canton of the flag); Sun Yat-sen (The red field of the flag)
- "Blue Sky with a White Sun" flag (青天白日旗); Republic of China naval jack
- Naval jack
- Use: Naval jack
- Proportion: 2:3
- Adopted: 1895
- Design: A white Sun with twelve rays on a navy blue background.
- Designed by: Lu Haodong
- Army flag
- Use: War flag
- Proportion: 2:3
- Design: A red field with a navy blue rectangular center with a white sun with twelve rays on top of the blue.
- Commander-in-chief standard
- Use: Presidential standard
- Proportion: 2:3
- Design: A red field with a yellow border and navy blue circle on the top, a white sun with twelve rays is on top of the blue.

Flag of the Republic of China
- Traditional Chinese: 中華民國國旗
- Simplified Chinese: 中华民国国旗
- Literal meaning: Republic of China flag
Transcriptions
Standard Mandarin
- Hanyu Pinyin: Zhōnghuá Mínguó Guóqí
- Bopomofo: ㄓㄨㄥ ㄏㄨㄚˊ ㄇㄧㄣˊ ㄍㄨㄛˊ ㄍㄨㄛˊ ㄑㄧˊ
- Wade–Giles: Chung^{1}-hua^{2} Min^{2}-kuo^{2} Kuo^{2}-ch'i^{2}
- Tongyong Pinyin: Jhong-huá Mín-guó Guó-qí
- IPA: [ʈʂʊ́ŋ.xwǎ mǐn.kwǒ kwǒ.tɕʰǐ]
Yue: Cantonese
- Yale Romanization: Jūngwàh Màhn·gwok gwokkèih

Blue Sky, White Sun and a Wholly Red Earth
- Traditional Chinese: 青天白日滿地紅
- Simplified Chinese: 青天白日满地红
- Literal meaning: Blue sky, white sun, wholly red earth
Transcriptions
Standard Mandarin
- Hanyu Pinyin: Qīng Tiān, Bái Rì, Mǎn Dì Hóng
- Bopomofo: ㄑㄧㄥ ㄊㄧㄢ ㄅㄞˊ ㄖˋ ㄇㄢˇ ㄉㄧˋ ㄏㄨㄥˊ
- Wade–Giles: Ch’ing^{1} T’ien^{1}, Bai^{2} Jih^{4}, Man^{3} Ti^{4} Hung^{2}
- Tongyong Pinyin: Cing Tian, Bái Rìh, Mǎn Dì Hóng
- IPA: [tɕʰíŋ.tʰjɛ́n pǎɪ.ɻɻ̩̂ màn.tî.xʊ̌ŋ]

The flag of the Republic of China, now also known as the flag of Taiwan, consists of a red field with a blue canton bearing a white disk surrounded by twelve triangles; said symbols symbolize the sun and rays of light emanating from it, respectively.

The flag was originally designed by the anti-Qing group, the Revive China Society, in 1895 with the addition of the red field component in 1906 by Sun Yat-sen in his speech. This was first used in mainland China as the Navy flag in 1912, and was made the official national flag of the Republic of China in 1928 by the Nationalist government and was also used by the Japanese-backed Chinese Republic from 1943. It was enshrined in the sixth article of the ROC constitution when it was promulgated in 1947.

The flag is no longer used in mainland China due to the ROC defeat in the Chinese Civil War and the founding of the People's Republic of China (PRC) in 1949, the ROC national flag has since remained in official use within the Taiwan Area. The PRC regards the flag as historical object of a former regime, and thus it allows its limited public display in historical museums and war cemeteries across mainland China, but its use otherwise remains largely contentious and widely restricted due to the One China Principle.

In Taiwan, many Taiwan independence supporters reject the flag due to its association with Chinese nationalism and as a statement of opposition against the Kuomintang. The Democratic Progressive Party, while advocating Taiwanese nationalism, generally takes a moderate position towards the current flag in use, and largely supports its display in diplomatic occasions against blockade of the PRC.

== History ==
China Burma India Theater of World War II insignia, formed by the combination of both the flag of the Republic of China and the flag of the United States

The canton (upper corner on the hoist side) originated from the "Blue Sky with a White Sun flag" (青天白日旗; qīngtiān báirì qí) designed by Lu Haodong, a martyr of the First Guangzhou Uprising of 1895. He presented his design to represent the revolutionary army at the inauguration of the Society for Regenerating China, an anti-Qing society in Hong Kong, on 21 February 1895. This design was later adopted as the KMT party flag and the coat of arms of the Republic of China. The "red Earth" portion was added by Sun Yat-sen in winter of 1906, bringing the flag to its modern form. According to George Yeo, the Foreign Minister of Singapore, in those days the Blue Sky with a White Sun flag was sewn in the Sun Yat Sen Villa or Wan Qing Yuan in Singapore by Teo Eng Hock and his wife.

During the Xinhai Revolution in 1911 that heralded the Republic, the various revolutionary armies had different flags. Lu Hao-tung's "Blue Sky with a White Sun" flag was used in the provinces of Guangdong, Guangxi, Yunnan, and Guizhou. In Jiujiang, the "Blue Sky, White Sun, and a Wholly Red Earth" flag was used on ships during a naval uprising. In Wuhan, a flag with 18 yellow stars was used to represent the 18 administrative divisions at the time of the Wuchang Uprising. In Shanghai and northern China, a "Five-color Flag" (五色旗; wǔ sè qí) (Five Races Under One Union flag) was used of five horizontal stripes representing the five major ethnicities of China: the Han (red), the Manchus (yellow), the Mongols (blue), the Hui (white), and the Tibetans (black).

When the government of the Republic of China was established, the "Five-color Flag" was immediately selected by the provisional Senate as the national flag. The "18-Star Flag" was adopted by the army and the modern flag was adopted as a naval ensign. Sun Yat-sen, however, did not consider the five-color flag appropriate, reasoning that horizontal order implied a hierarchy or class like that which existed during dynastic times.

After President Yuan Shikai assumed dictatorial powers in 1913 by dissolving the National Assembly and outlawing the KMT, Sun Yat-sen established a government-in-exile in Tokyo and employed the modern flag as the national ROC flag. He continued using this design when the KMT established a rival government in Guangzhou in 1917. The modern flag was made official by National Emblem and National Flag of the Republic of China Act (中華民國國徽國旗法; Zhōnghuá Mínguó guóhuī guóqífǎ) on 17 December 1928, after the successful Northern Expedition that toppled the Beiyang government, though the Five-color Flag still continued to be used by locals in an unofficial capacity. One reason for this discrepancy in use was lingering regional biases held by officials and citizens of northern China, who favored the Five-color Flag, against southerners such as the Cantonese/Hakka Sun Yat-sen.

During the Second Sino-Japanese War, the invading Japanese established a variety of puppet governments using several flag designs. The Reformed Government was established in March 1938 in Nanjing to consolidate the various puppet governments that employed the Five-color Flag. When Wang Jingwei was slated to take over the Japanese-installed government in Nanjing in 1940, he demanded to use the modern flag as a means to challenge the authority of the Nationalist Government in Chongqing under Chiang Kai-shek and position himself as the rightful successor to Sun Yat-sen. However, the Japanese preferred the Five-color flag. As a compromise, the Japanese suggested adding a triangular yellow pennant on top with the slogan "Peace, Anticommunism, National Construction" (和平反共建國; Hépíng fǎngòng jiàn guó) in black, but this was rejected by Wang. In the end, Wang and the Japanese agreed that the yellow banner was to be used outdoors only, until 1943 when the banner was abandoned, leaving two rival governments with the same flag, each claiming to be the legitimate Nationalist government of China.

The national flag was specified in Article Six of the 1947 Constitution of the Republic of China. The flag was also used in Communist-held areas until 1949. After the Chinese Civil War began to ease, the government of Chiang Kai-shek relocated the Republic of China to the island of Taiwan, whose administration was handed over to the ROC from Japan in 1945. On the mainland, the communist forces of Mao Zedong established the People's Republic of China and adopted their own national flag.

On 23 October 1954, the latest amendment to the National Emblem and National Flag of the Republic of China Act was promulgated by the Legislative Yuan to specify the size, measure, ratio, production, and management of the flag.

== Symbolism ==
The national flag in darker shades.

The "Blue Sky with a White Sun" flag of Lu Hao-tung was unveiled in February 1895 in Hong Kong. The twelve rays of the white Sun symbolize the twelve months and the twelve traditional shichen (時辰; shíchén), a traditional unit of time which corresponds to two modern hours. Sun Yat-sen added the "Red Earth" to the flag to signify the blood of the revolutionaries who sacrificed themselves in order to overthrow the Qing dynasty and create the ROC. Together, the three colors of the flag correspond to the Three Principles of the People: Blue represents nationalism and liberty; White represents democracy and equality; and Red represents the people's livelihood and fraternity. President Chiang Kai-shek proclaimed on the National Day in 1929, "As long as a national flag with Blue Sky, White Sun, and a Wholly Red Earth flies in the land of China, it will symbolize the independence and liberty of the descendants of the Huang Emperor".

The blue-and-white canton of the ROC flag is often used as the party flag of the KMT. The flag has developed a great deal of additional symbolism due to the unique and controversial political status of Taiwan. At one level, the flag represents a clear symbol that Taiwan is not governed by the same government as mainland China, as this flag is different from the flag of the People's Republic of China (PRC).

Meanwhile, because it was formerly used as the flag over all of China, the flag has become a symbol of continuity with the ideals of the Chinese nationalism and Chinese unification movements, and has become a symbol of a connection both historical and current with mainland China. In addition, the flag is derived from the seal of the KMT, and the color of the field of the flag is associated with the KMT party colors.

Some Chinese see the flag as an expression of Chinese nationalism and pride combined with simultaneous disapproval for the current communist regime. Additionally, the flag may symbolize identification with, and admiration for the political thoughts of Sun Yat-sen, and his Three Principles of the People.

One irony is that given the association of the flag with Chinese nationalism in opposition to Taiwan independence, the ROC flag has found an unexpected ally in the People's Republic of China. The PRC has criticized Taiwan independence groups for wishing to change or abolish the ROC flag, and has implied that legal steps to do so would bring a strongly negative reaction from the PRC.

However, the presence of the ROC flag in Taiwan also distinguishes the fact that Taiwan and ROC territorial islands elsewhere fall under jurisdiction of a country separate from that of mainland China, the People's Republic of China (PRC). The hoisting of the ROC flag is even advocated by the most extreme Taiwanese independence supporters, such as Taiwan Solidarity Union members when emphasizing the separate and independently governed systems and territories of the Republic of China and the People's Republic of China in mainland China.

== Construction details ==
National flag construction sheet (Chinese).

National flag construction sheet (dimensional).

The specific designs of the flag are located in the National Emblem and National Flag of the Republic of China Act from 1928. The ratio of the flag is 2:3, with most of it being red. The first quarter is blue, which contains the sun surrounded by 12 rays. The radius of the white sun is the 1/8 of the width of the canton (totally 1/16 of the width of the flag). Each sun ray is 30 degrees, so the total sun rays will make up a complete 360 degree circle. The distance between the center of the sun and top of sun ray is the same as the diameter of the sun. The sun and 12 rays are divided by a blue ring, its width is 1/15 of the diameter of the white sun.

In later years, more detailed instructions regarding of the canton area (also used as the flag of the KMT), were codified into law. In the drawing released in Act on the Methods for Party and National Flags Production and Usage (黨旗國旗之製造及使用辦法), the sun was drawn in more specific detail and mathematical values were given to all elements in the flag. In the law, the canton still had a ratio of 2:3, but the math values given were 24 × 36 meters. The diameter of the sun with rays is 6/8 of height of the canton, so in this case, it will be 18. The diameter of the white sun without the sun rays is 1/4 of the width of the canton, so it is 9. The blue ring that is on top of this sun and part of the rays is 1/15 diameter of the white sun, so the size will be 0.6. The angle of the rays, 30 degrees, and the total number of rays have not changed.

The colors of the national flag are red, white and blue. However, the KMT party flag only uses white and dark blue; both flags are to be topped with a golden finial. The law does not list any specific color processes, such as Pantone, to manufacturing or drawing the flag. The Ministry of the Interior provides CMYK values only for reference.

Color scheme	Blue	Red	White
CMYK	100, 80, 0, 20	0, 100, 100, 5~10	0, 0, 0, 0
RGB (Note: Extrapolation based on the MOI's recommended CMYK values.)	0, 40, 204	243, 0, 1	255, 255, 255
Hexadecimal	#0028CC	#F30001	#FFFFFF

== Uses ==
In the early years of the Republic, under the KMT's political tutelage, the flag shared the same prominence as the KMT party flag. A common wall display consisted of the KMT flag perched on the left and the ROC flag perched on the right, each tilted at an angle with a portrait of Father of the Nation Sun Yat-sen displayed in the center. For the summits held between the KMT and Communist Party during the Chinese Civil War, the ROC flag was displayed at an equal position to the flag of the Chinese Soviet Republic (Jiangxi Soviet). Later, the flag law specified a horizontal display of the flag with the portrait of Sun Yat-sen in a portion of the red field at the center position. This display can be found in numerous government offices in Taiwan and is that which the president and vice president face to take the oath of office.

The flag has a ubiquitous presence in Taiwan. The hoisting and lowering of the flag are ceremoniously accompanied by the National Flag Anthem of the Republic of China while those present stand at attention to give a standard salute with the right hand, held flat, to the right eyebrow. Schoolchildren have traditionally been required to attend morning rallies where the flag is raised after a rendition of the National Anthem of the Republic of China. Before martial law was lifted in 1987 in Taiwan, it was required that all vehicles be halted when passing by a flag ceremony.

The Chinese Taipei Olympic Committee flag (known in Chinese as the 'Plum Blossom Banner') is derived from and used in place of the flag of the Republic of China at the Olympic Games and in some sporting events.

Instead, the ROC is usually represented under a pseudonym (usually "Chinese Taipei").

The symbolism of the ROC flag began to shift in the early 21st century as there was a warming of relations between the pan-Blue coalition in Taiwan and the Chinese Communist Party on mainland China. The flag of the Republic of China has begun to symbolize a common shared history between both mainland China and Taiwan, and as such the government of the PRC has made it clear that for Taiwan to change the flag would be a major provocation in favor of Taiwan independence. The ambiguity surrounding the flag was made apparent during the trip of Kuomintang Chairman Lien Chan to mainland China in April 2005, during which the flag was very prominently displayed at ceremonies honoring Sun Yat-Sen at which both KMT party officials and government officials from the PRC were in attendance. One place in mainland China where the White Sun emblem is still prominently displayed in public is the ceiling mosaic within Sun Yat-sen Mausoleum in Nanjing.

The use of the flag in Taiwan reflects the controversy behind its symbolism. Although supporters of Taiwan independence, such as former president Chen Shui-bian, will display and salute the flag on formal official state occasions, it is never seen at political rallies of the Democratic Progressive Party. This is not only because of its association with mainland China but also because the flag contains design elements of the KMT party flag. By contrast, the ROC flag is always extremely prominent at political rallies of the pan-Blue coalition. This difference extends to the colors seen at the rallies. Rallies of the pan-Blue coalition give prominence to the colors of the ROC flag, with very large amounts of blue and smaller amounts of red. Rallies of independence-leaning parties are filled with green, with no blue or red at all.

Supporters of Taiwan independence, including former president Lee Teng-hui, have called for the abandonment of the flag, and there are a number of alternative designs for a specifically Taiwanese flag. However, the prospects for this are not high given that changing the flag requires a constitutional amendment; that the current flag has a huge amount of support among pan-Blue supporters and grudging acceptance among moderate independence supporters; and because changing the flag might cause political tension with the PRC. During the 2004 ROC legislative elections, it was briefly suggested that if the pan-green coalition won the elections that it would force the KMT to change the party emblem to be different from the flag. This proposal generated a few days of controversy and was then quickly forgotten.

=== Chinese diaspora ===
There has been disagreement in the overseas Chinese community on which flag to fly to represent themselves; supporters and organizations of the Chinese democracy movement often fly the ROC flag rather than the PRC flag to symbolize opposition to Communist rule.

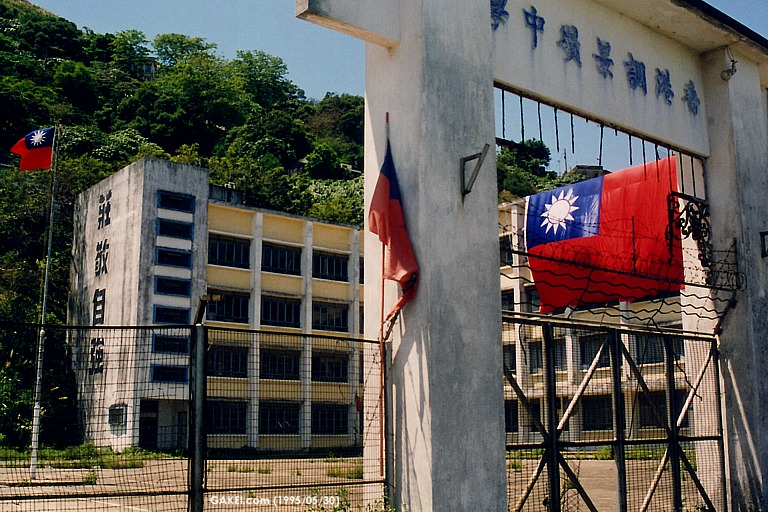
Rennie's Mill Middle School flying the ROC flag in Hong Kong, 1995

Some Hong Kongers have historically flown the ROC flag to demonstrate their shared opposition to the PRC's policies, as well as to honor the legacy of Sun Yat-sen, as part of the pro-ROC and pro-democracy camps. In recent years, however, due to the PRC's tightening of state control over Hong Kong, supporters of the ROC have faced severe restrictions in expressing their political support, especially in publicly flying the ROC flag or celebrating the National Day of the Republic of China on October 10th every year.

=== Desecration ===
Under Articles 118 and 160 of the Criminal Code of the Republic of China, it is a criminal offense to insult either the national flag or the national emblem of any country. If it is a national flag or emblem of a foreign country being insulted, the name of the offense would be "obstructing state diplomacy"; if it is the ones of the Republic of China, the offense would be "disturbing order". Besides, insulting or damaging the portrait of Sun Yat-sen is also punishable as "disturbing order". The penalty can be either incarceration for one year or less, or a fine of $9,000 NTD or less.

== Flag gallery ==
=== Subdivisions ===
Taiwan Province

Kaohsiung

New Taipei

Tainan

Taipei

Taoyuan

=== Military flags ===
Armed Forces

Army

Navy

Air Force

Marine Corps

Military Police

Armed Forces Reserve

Combined Logistics Command

=== Historical flags ===
==== National flags ====
18 star flag; banner of the Wuchang Uprising subsequently used as the flag of the army of the Republic of China

19 star flag; a flag of the army of the Republic of China, c. 1913–1928

First national flag of the Republic of China (1912–1928)

Current flag of the Republic of China (1928–present, in Taiwan after 1945). Also used as a naval ensign of the ROC since 1912.

The Flag of the Reorganized National Government of the Republic of China, a Japanese puppet state during World War II, was based on the Flag of the Republic of China.

The "Blue Sky with a White Sun flag" was designed by Lu Haodong in 1895 and is still used as the naval jack of the Republic as well as the flag of the Kuomintang (KMT).

== Gallery ==
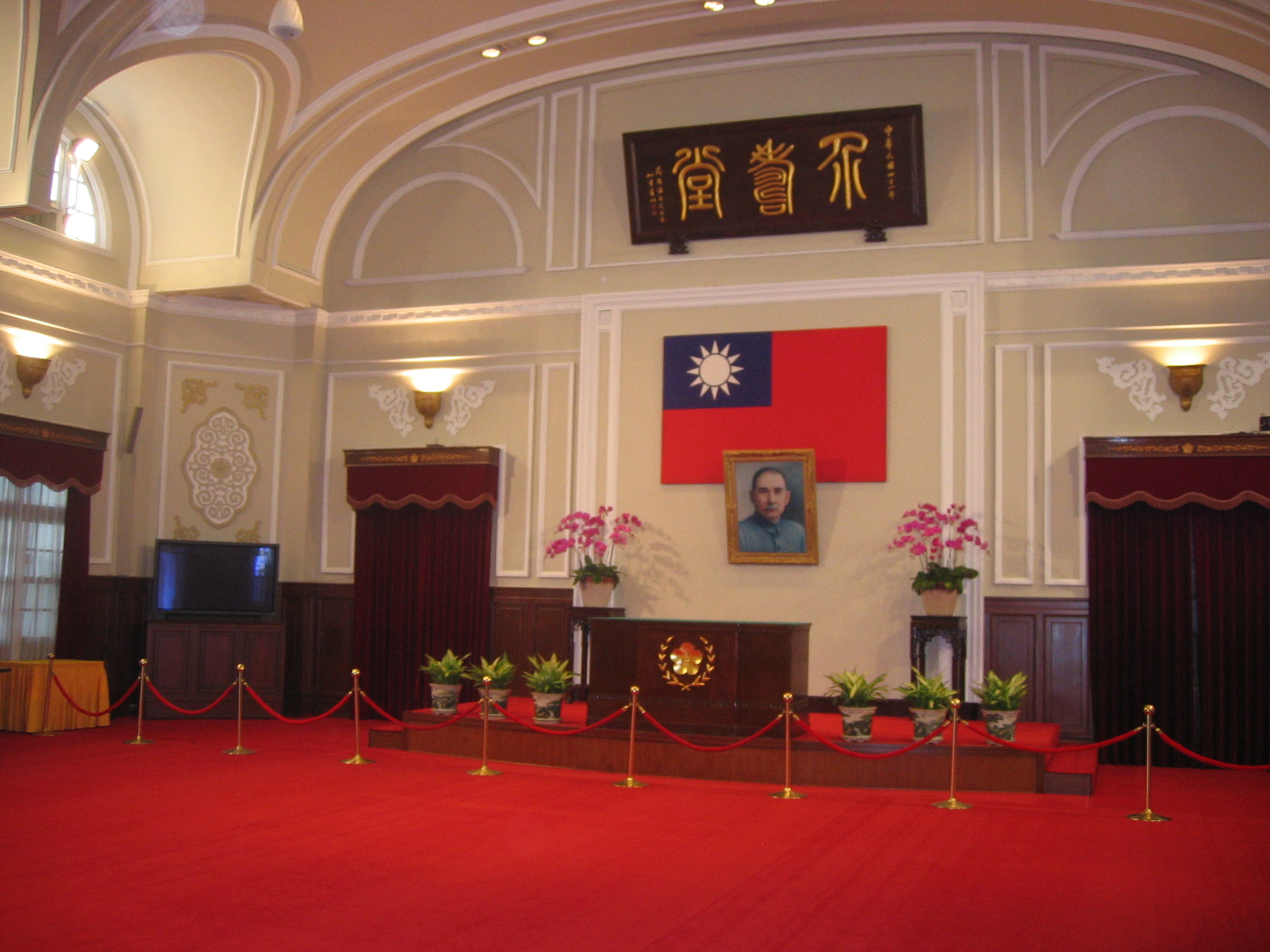
Chieh Shou Hall in the Presidential Office Building contains the flag and portrait of Sun Yat-sen which presidents face to take the oath of office.

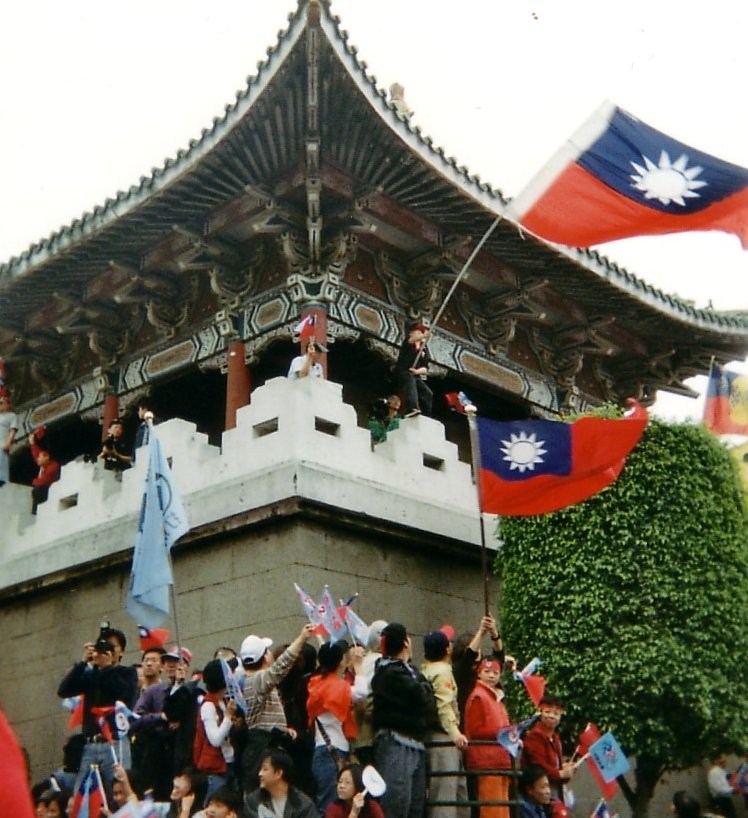
Pan-Blue supporters wave the ROC flag at a rally during the 2004 presidential election.

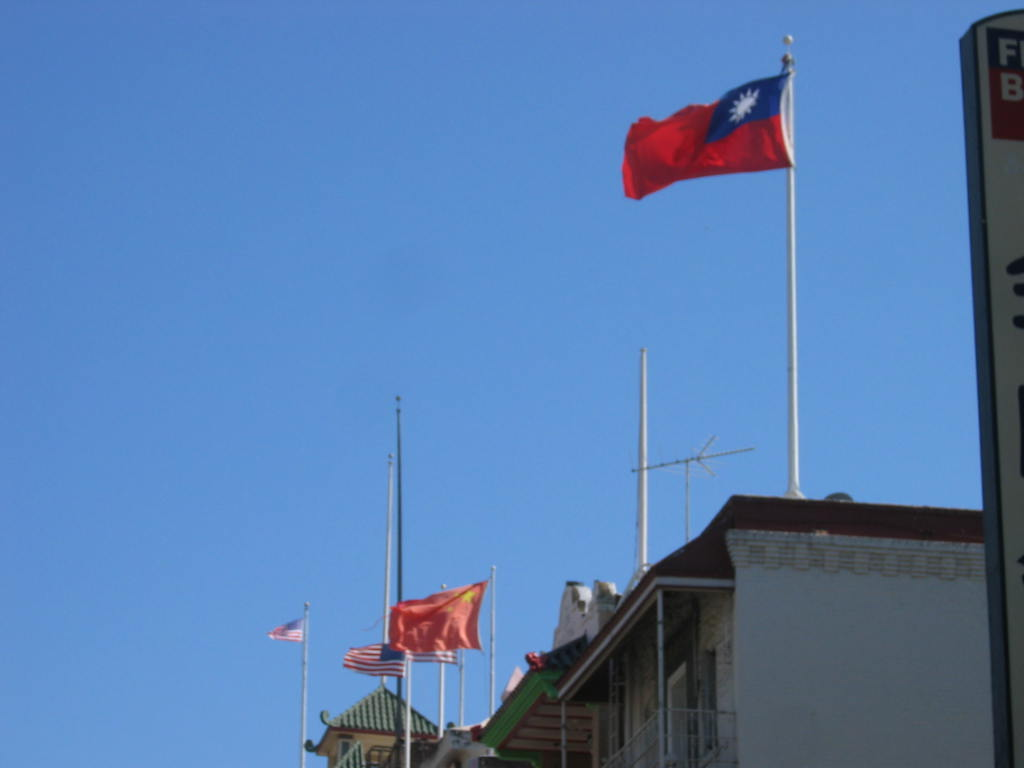
Flags of the ROC, PRC, and U.S. can be seen flying atop adjacent buildings in San Francisco Chinatown. Most benevolent associations in San Francisco, including the Chinese Six Companies, continue to fly the ROC flag due to their close relations with the KMT.

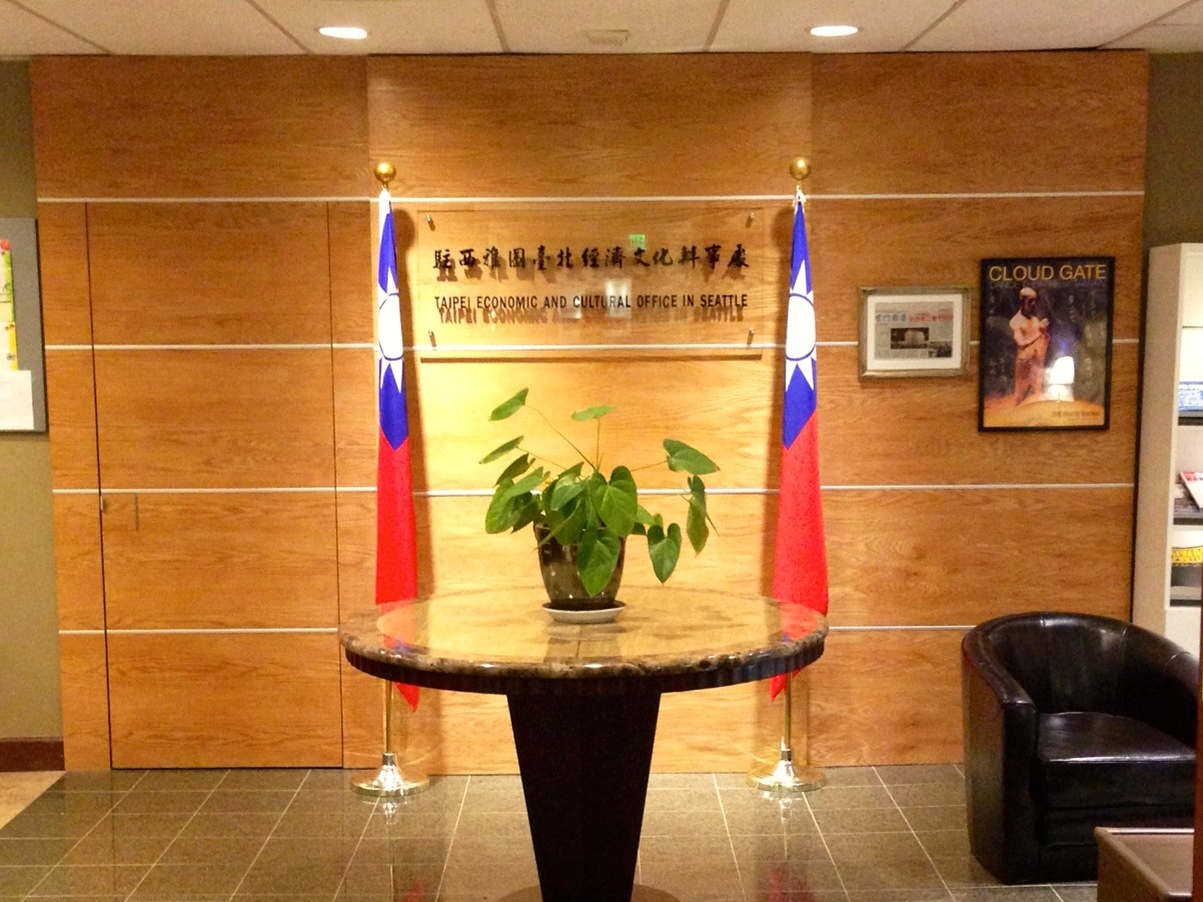
ROC flag in the Taipei Economic and Cultural Office in Seattle.

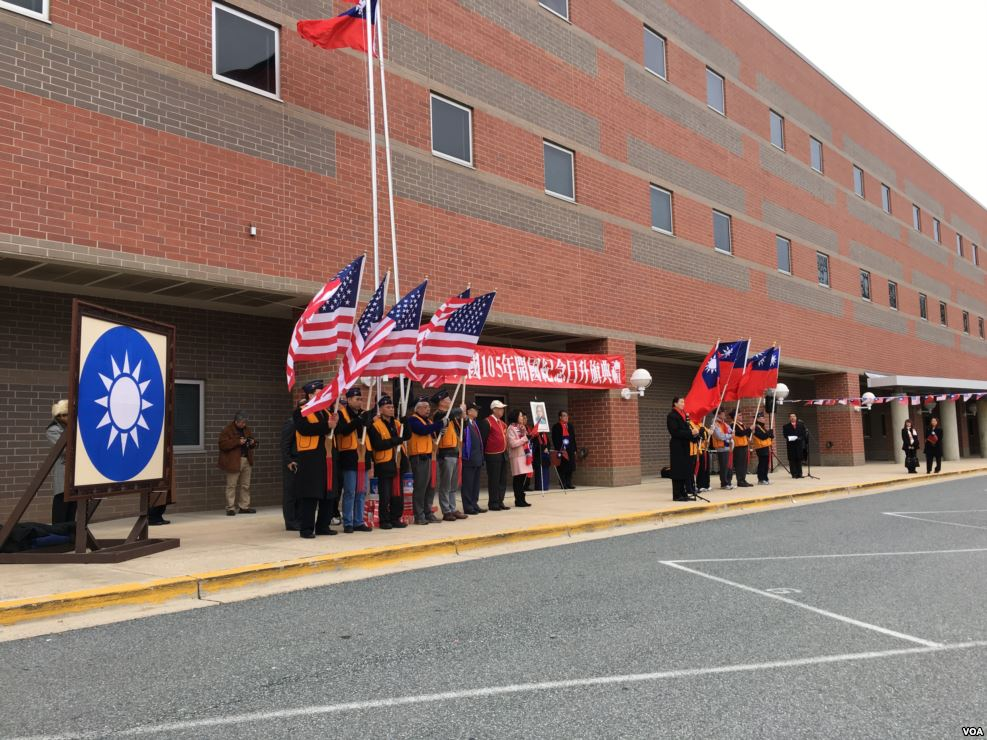
Flags of the United States and the ROC, 2016.

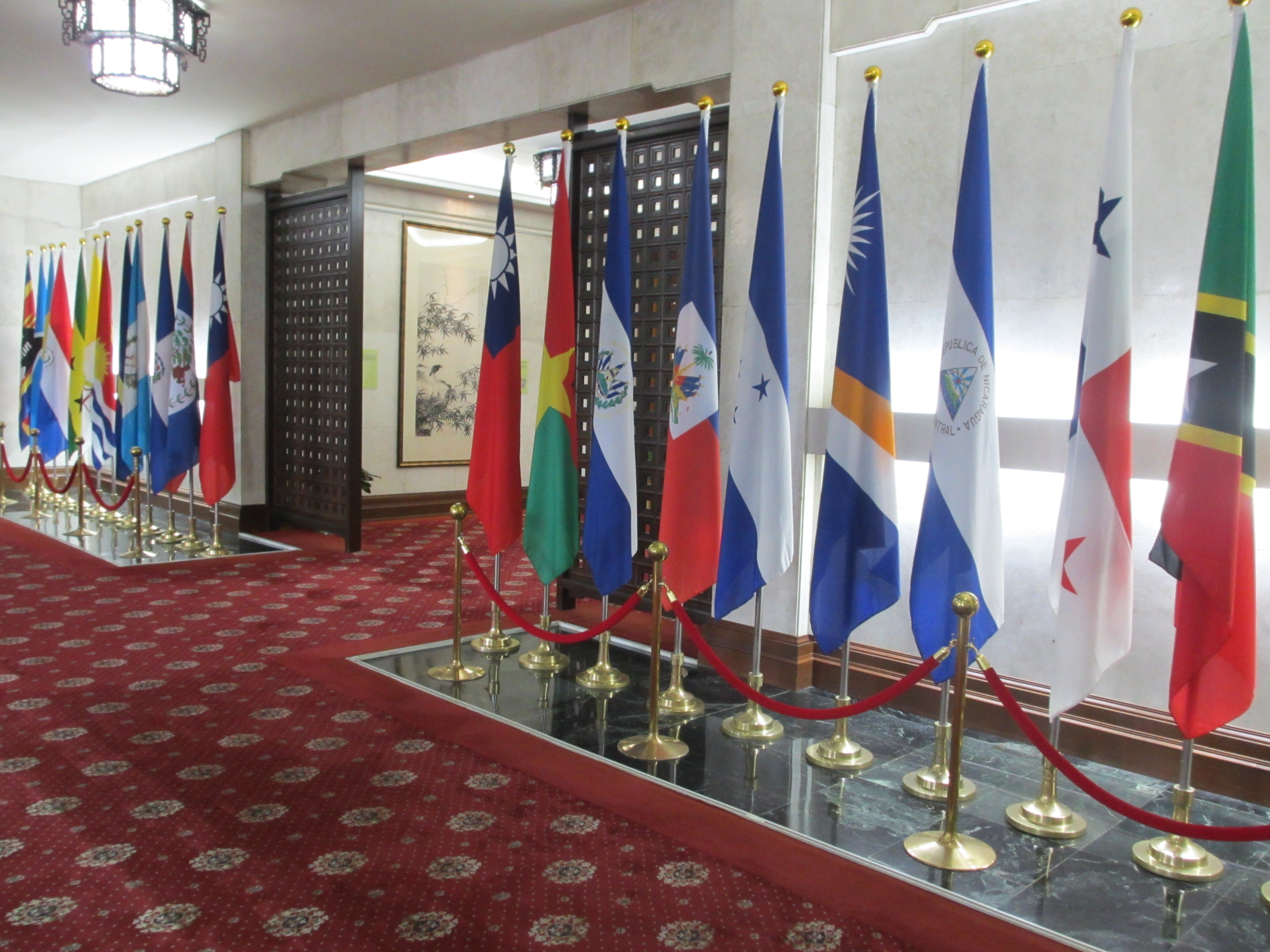
Flags of the ROC and its diplomatic allies.

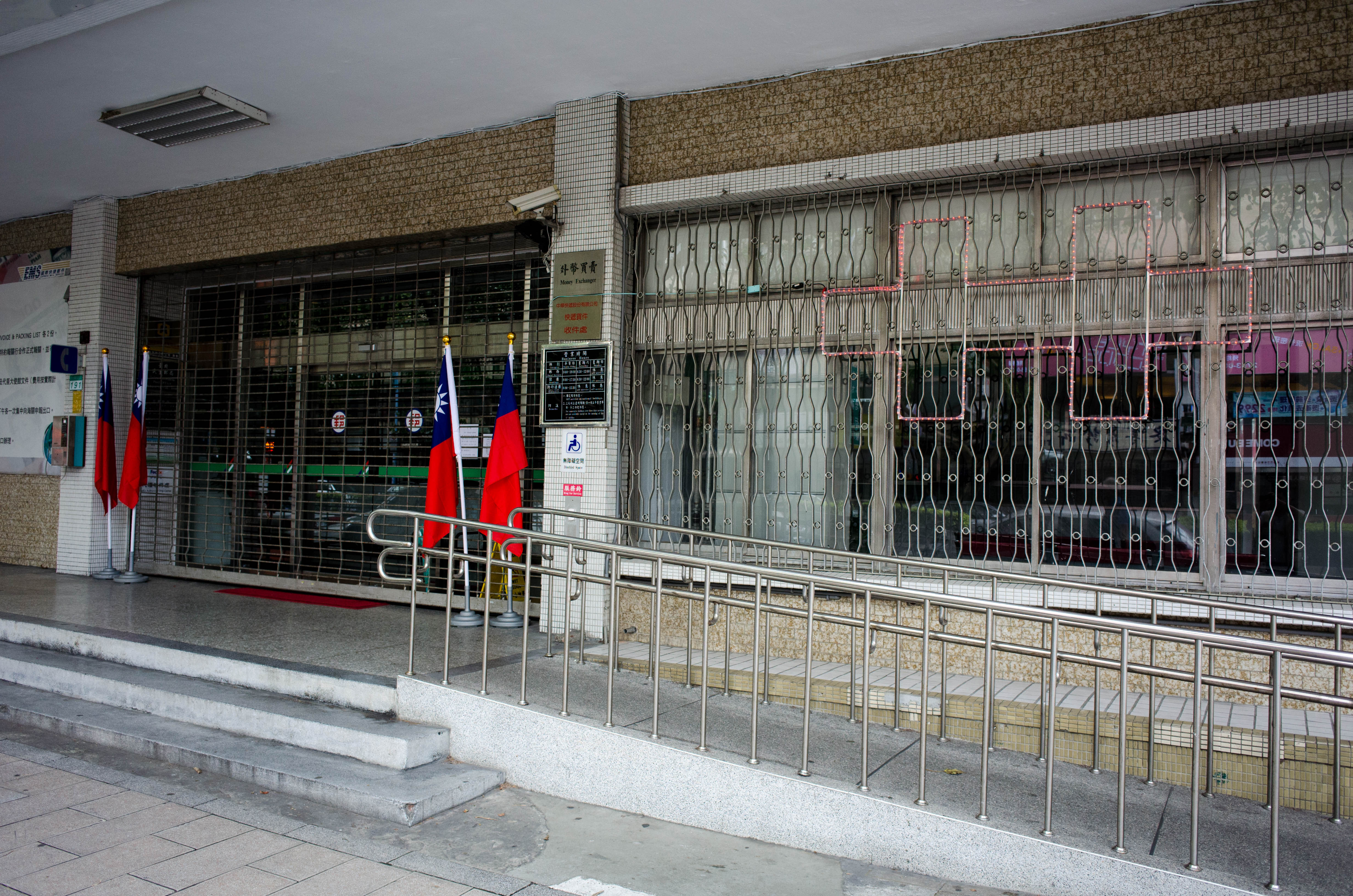
Four ROC flags in the Minsheng post office.

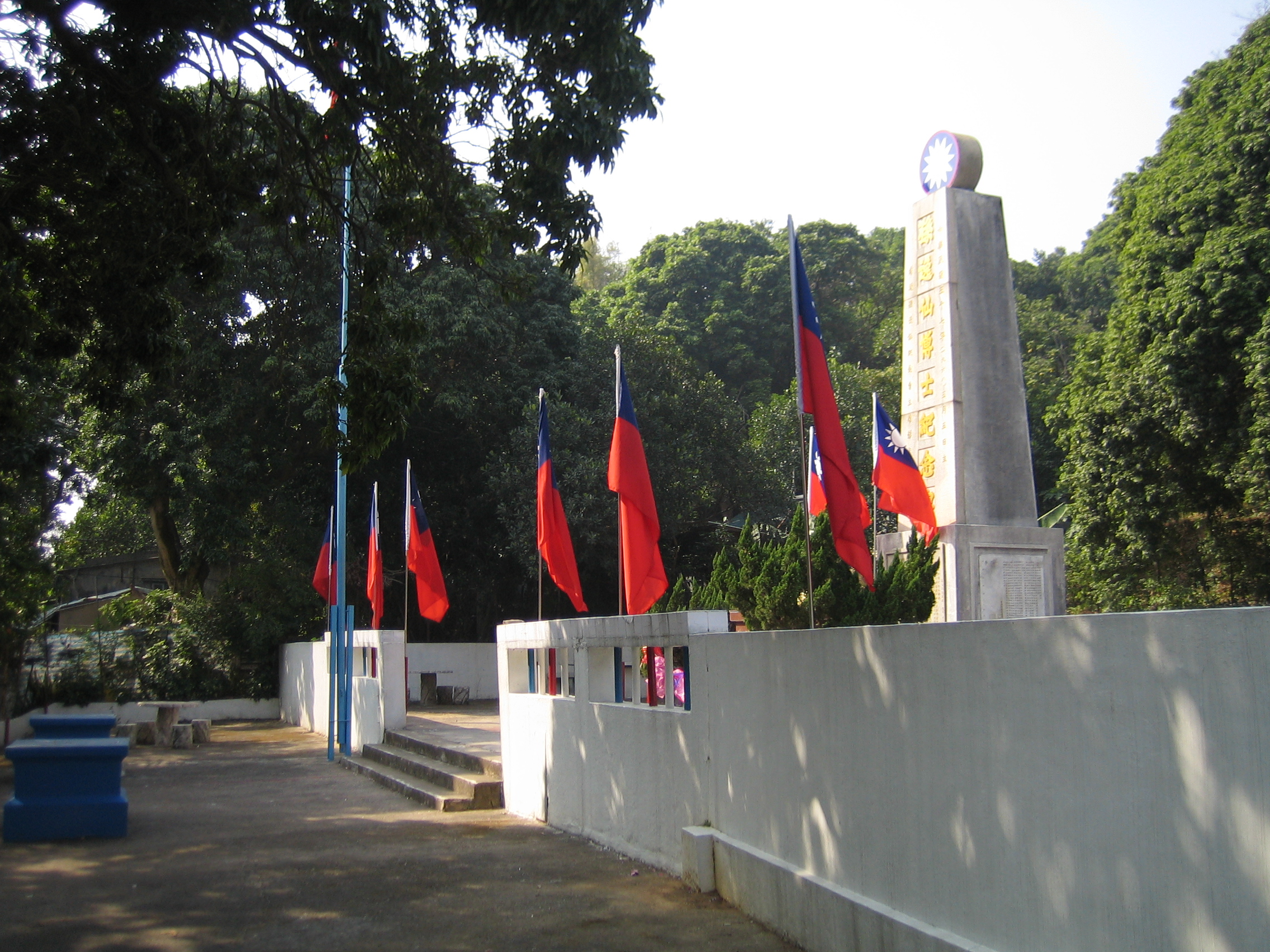
Series of the ROC flags at the Red House (Hong Kong).

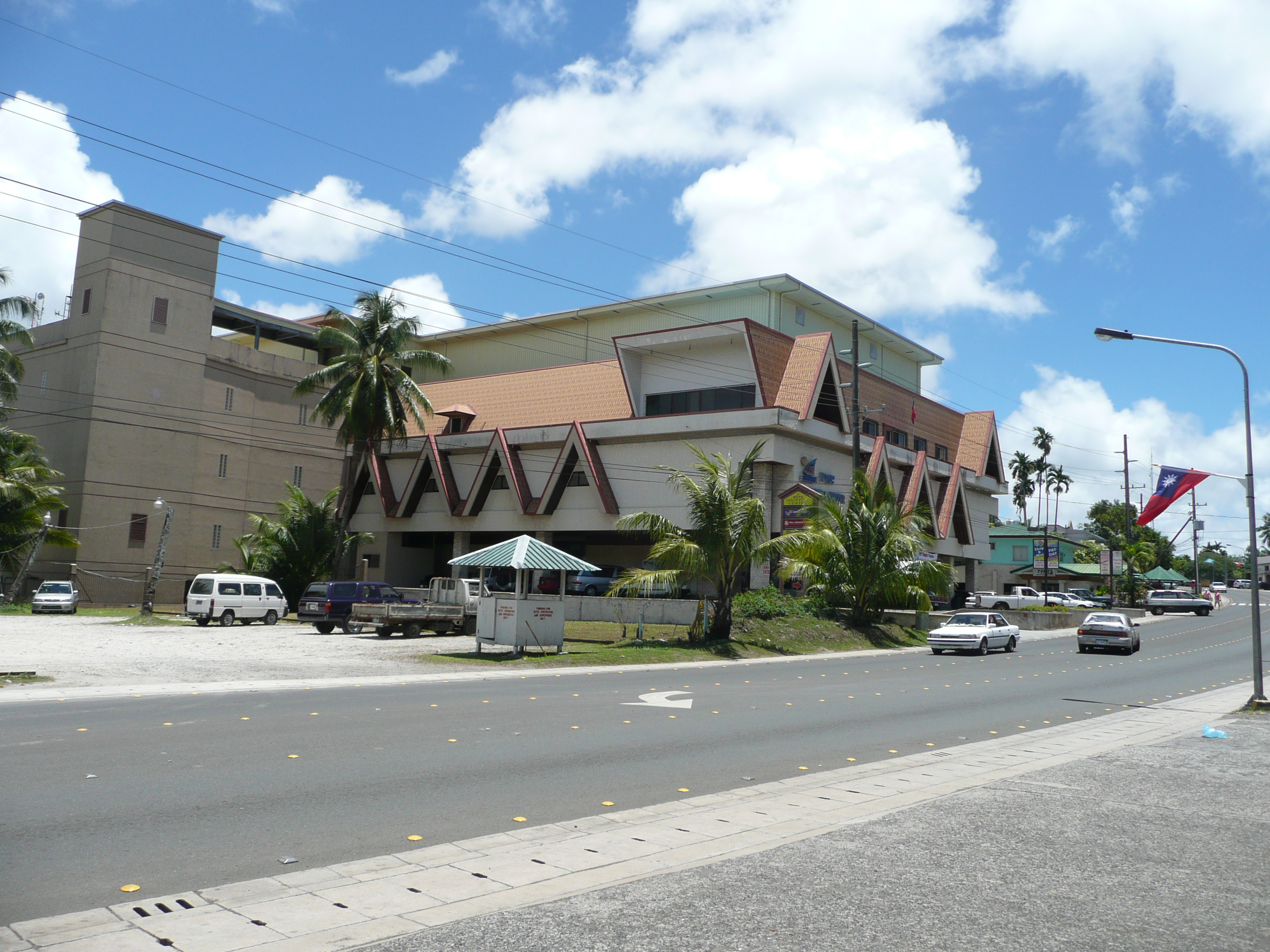
WCTC Shopping Center in Koror, Palau with Flag of Palau and ROC flags at this street.

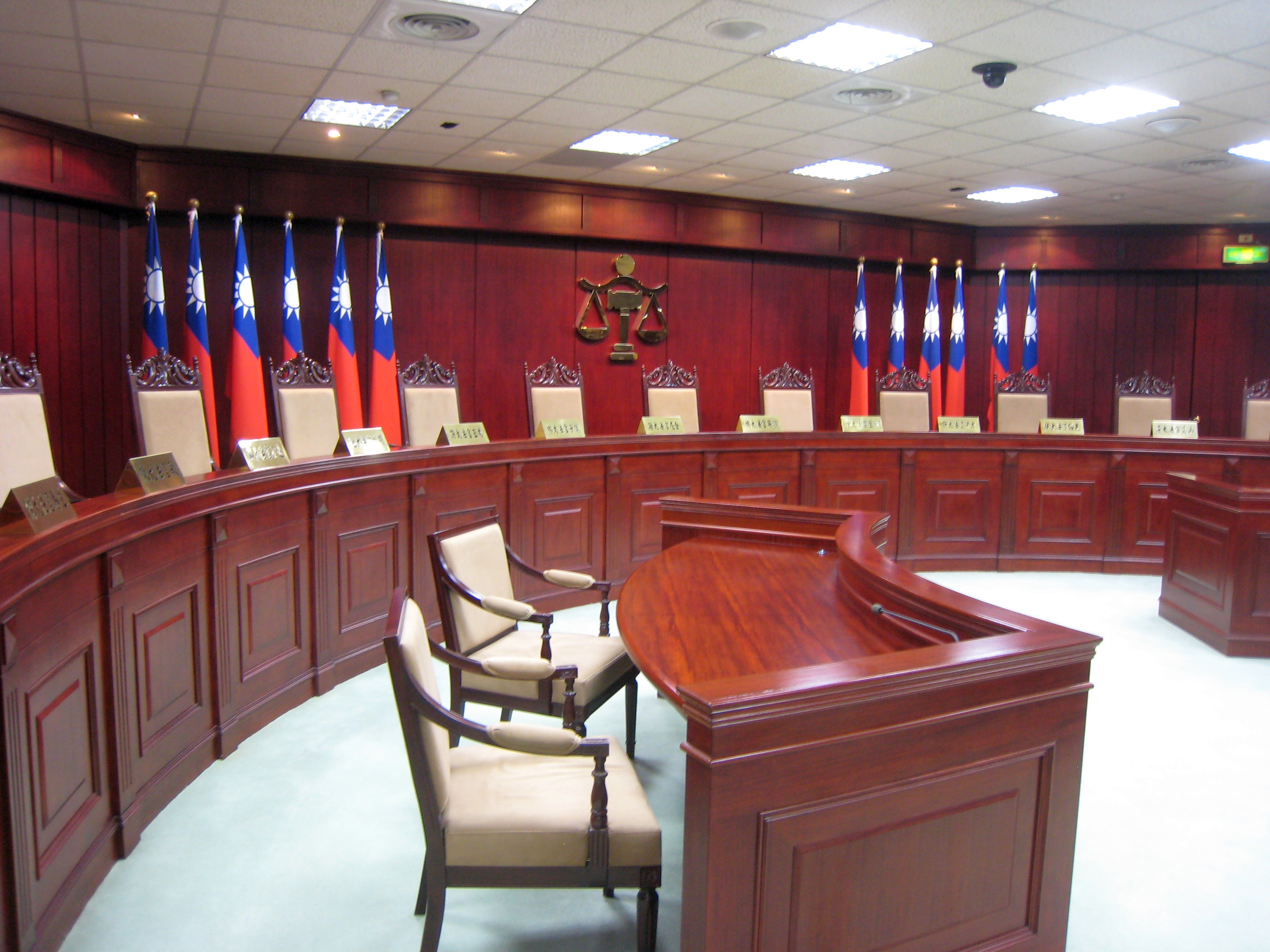
View of the ROC flags in the Judicial Yuan.

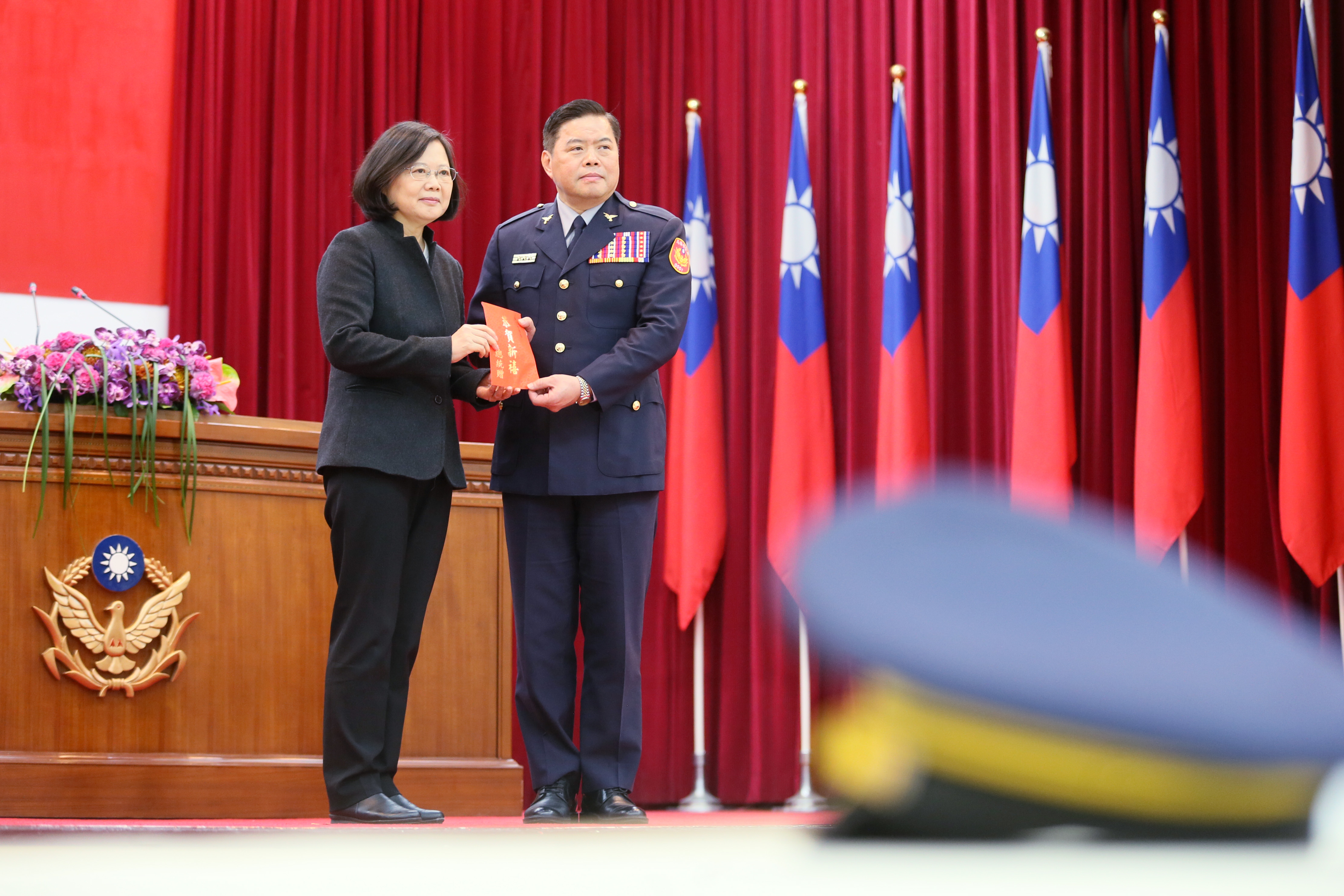
Tsai Ing-wen with the ROC flags in the background.

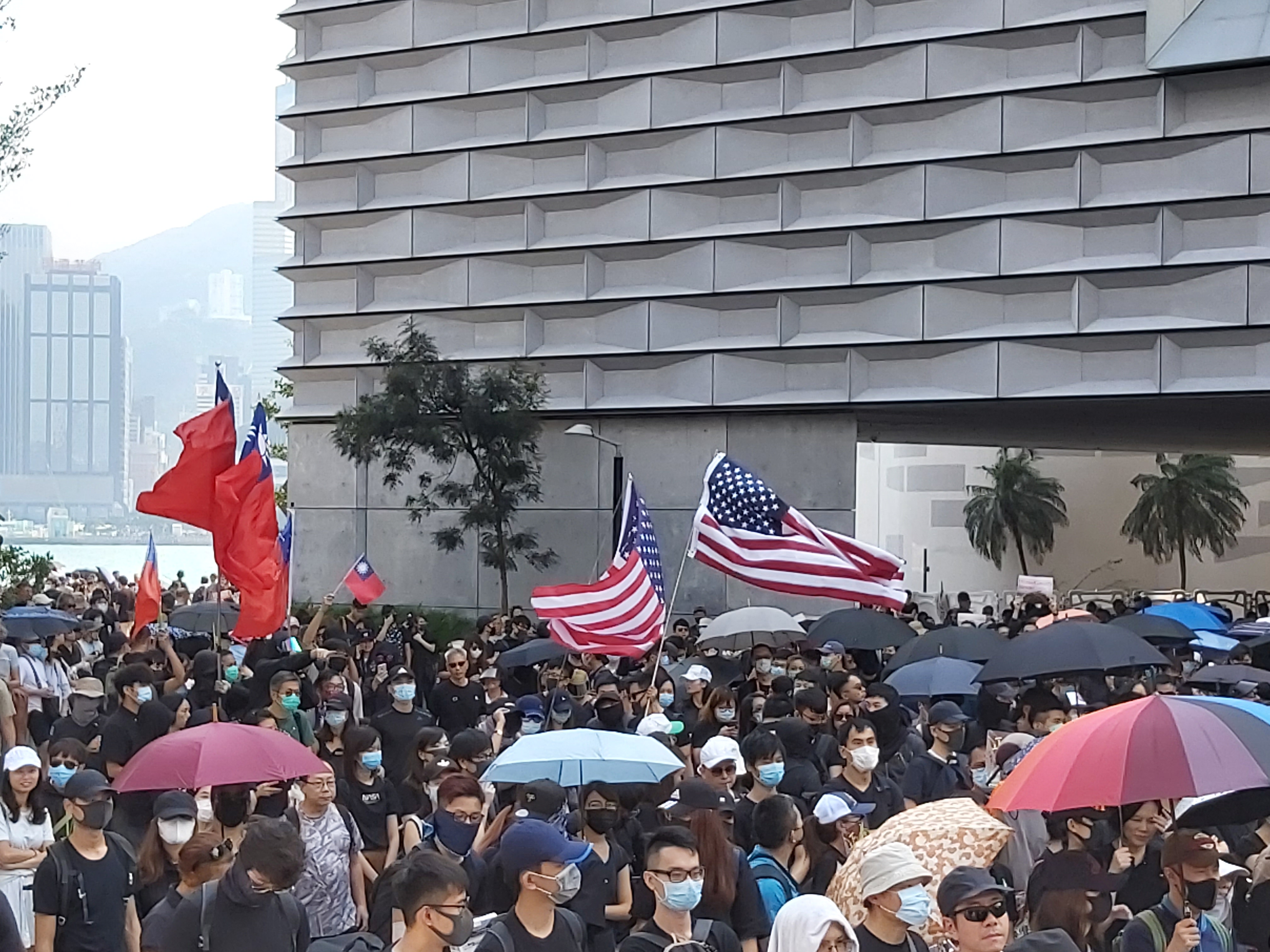
ROC flag seen alongside American flags in the 2019–20 Hong Kong protests, used as a symbol of political opposition to the PRC government.

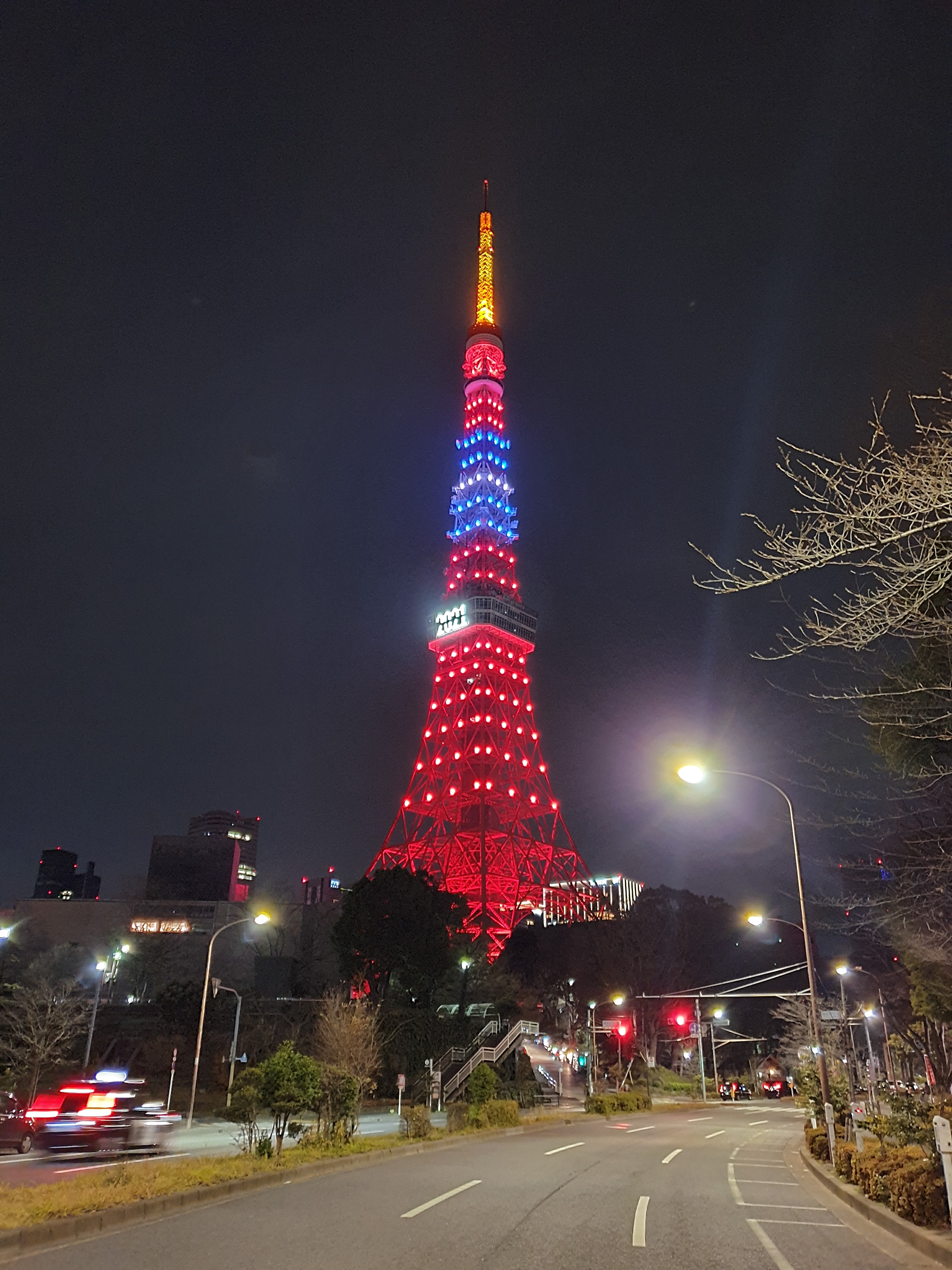
Tokyo Tower in Japan lit up with the ROC flag colors in 2021.

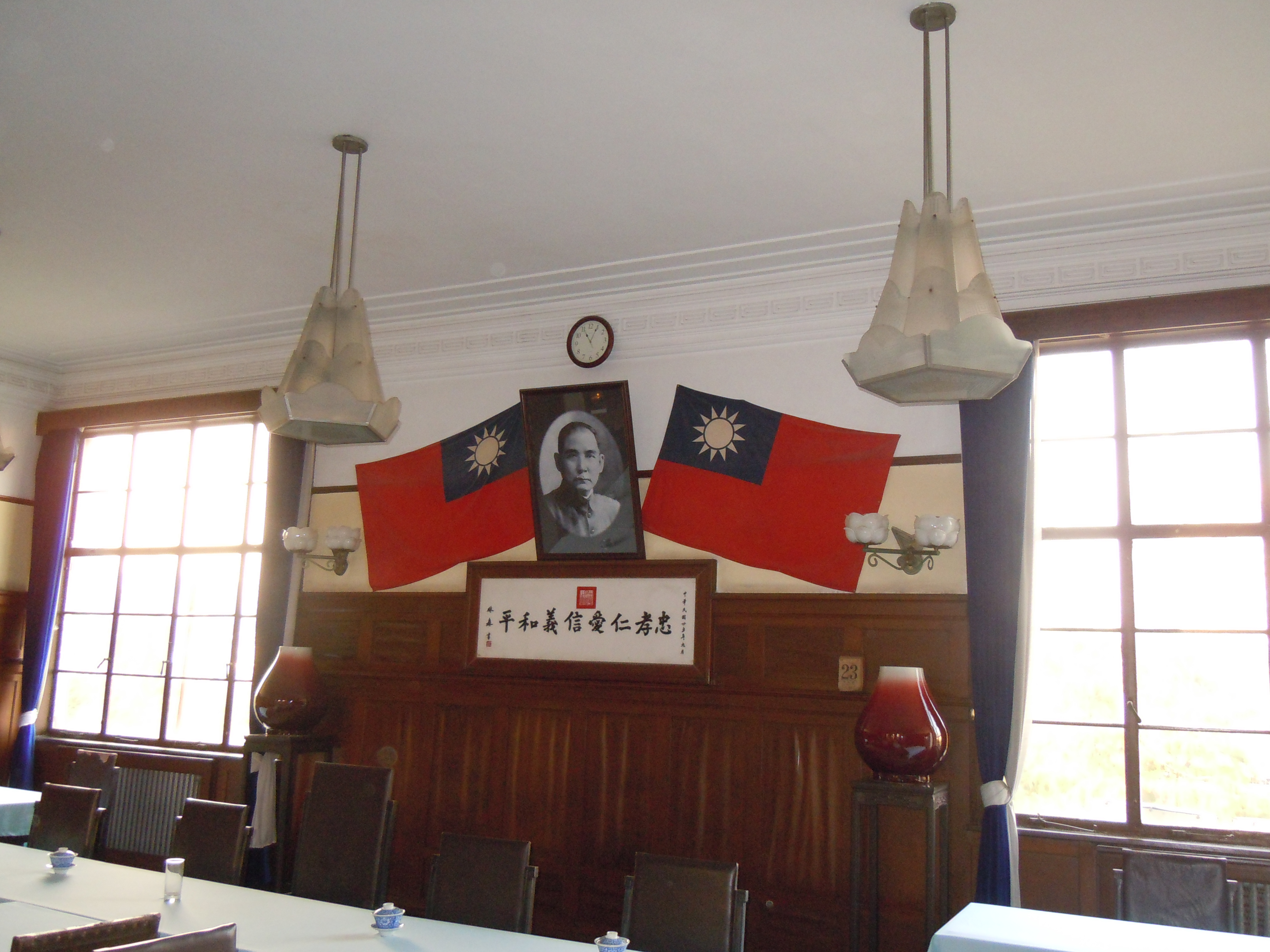
Flag in mainland China, at the Presidential Palace (Nanjing)

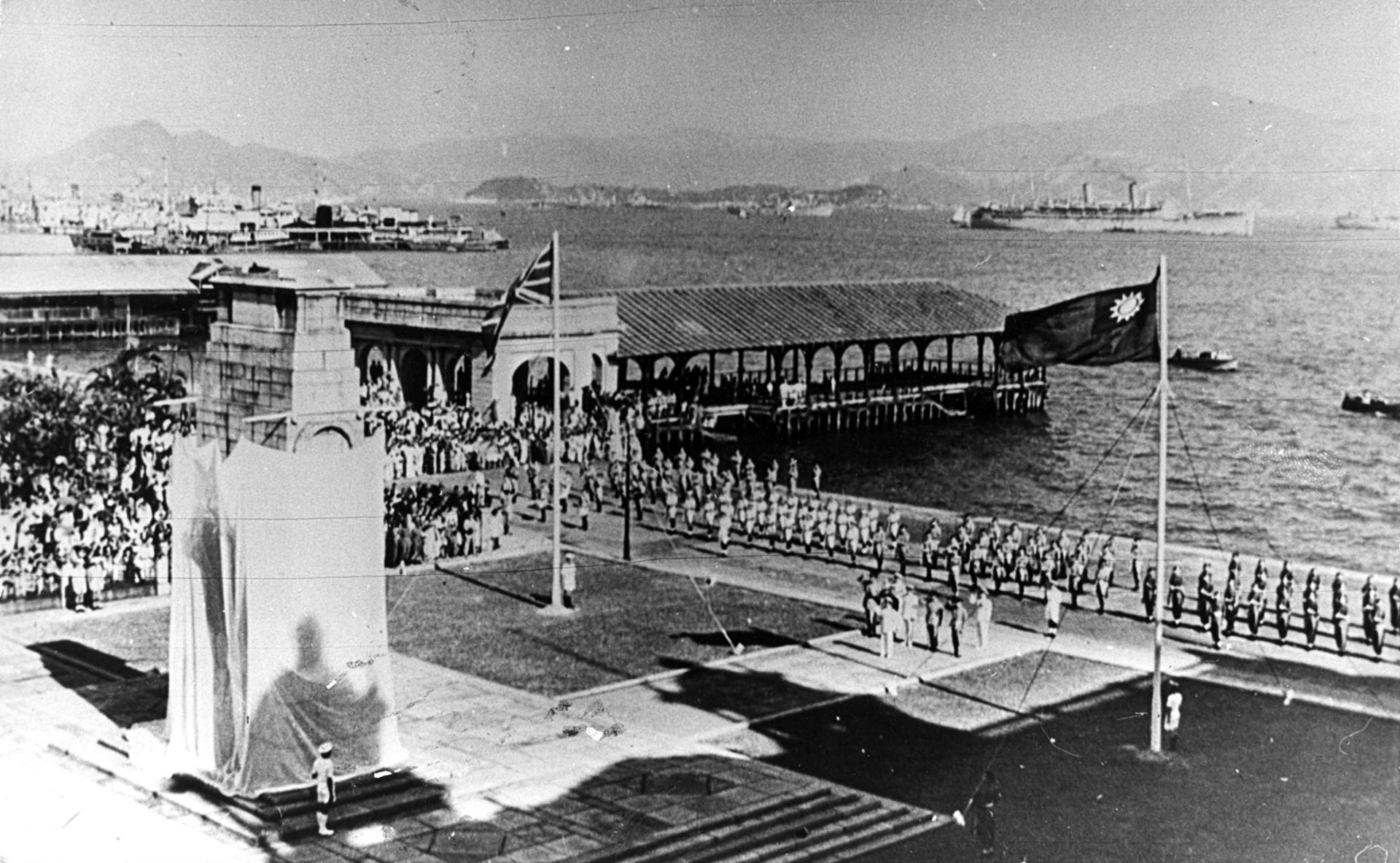
Flag in Hong Kong, Liberation Day in 1945

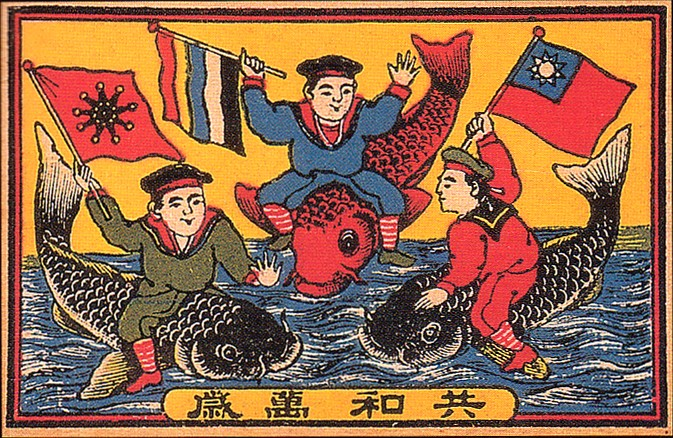
Flag in a propaganda poster Long Live the Republic

== See also ==
=== General ===
- Blue Sky with a White Sun (the national emblem of the Republic of China)
- Chinese Taipei Olympic flag
- Flag of the Qing dynasty
- Flag of the People's Republic of China
- Flag of Wang Jingwei regime
- History of the Republic of China
- List of Chinese flags (including PRC and ROC flags)
- List of Taiwanese flags (including ROC flags)
- Military of the Republic of China
- National Flag Anthem of the Republic of China
- Politics of the Republic of China
- Proposed flags of Taiwan
