= Yamato people =

East Asian ethnic group

Yamato
大和民族
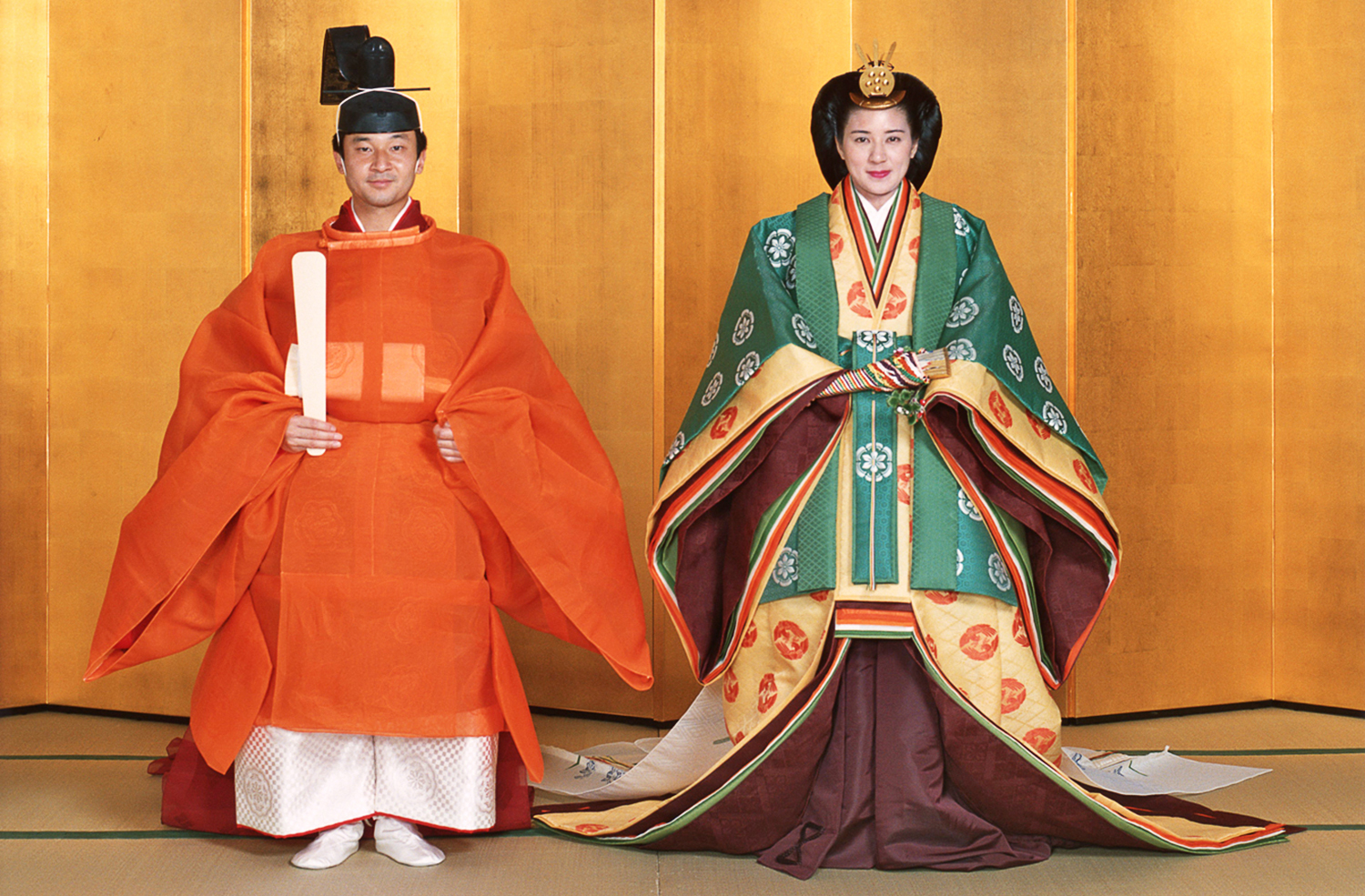
- Wedding ceremony of the Japanese imperial family (current Emperor Naruhito and current Empress Masako pictured) wearing kimono

Regions with significant populations
- Majority in the Japanese archipelago, except in the Ryukyu Islands and the Sakhalin Island

Languages
- Japanese

Religion
- Predominantly non-religious in modern times Traditionally: Shinto · Buddhism; Minority: Christianity · New religions

Related ethnic groups
- Japanese; Ryukyuan; Yayoi; Ainu; Jōmon

The Yamato (大和民族, Yamato minzoku; lit. 'Yamato ethnicity') or Wajin (和人 / 倭人; lit. 'Wa people'), also known as the Japanese, are an East Asian ethnic group that comprises over 98% of the population of Japan. Genetic and anthropometric studies have shown that the Yamato people predominantly descend from the Yayoi people, who migrated to Japan from the continent (probably the Korean Peninsula) beginning during the 1st millennium BC, with some ancestry from the indigenous Jōmon people who had inhabited the Japanese archipelago for millennia prior.

It can also refer to the first people that settled in Yamato Province (modern-day Nara Prefecture). Generations of Japanese archeologists, historians, and linguists have debated whether the word is related to the earlier Yamatai (邪馬臺). Around the 6th century, the Yamato clan set up Japan's first and only dynasty. The clan became the ruling faction in the area, and incorporated the natives of Japan and migrants from the mainland. The clan leaders also elevated their own belief system that featured ancestor worship into a national religion known as Shinto.

The term came to be used around the late 19th century to distinguish the settlers of mainland Japan from minority ethnic groups inhabiting the peripheral areas of the then Empire of Japan, including the Ainu, Ryukyuans, Nivkh, as well as Chinese, Koreans, and Austronesians (Taiwanese indigenous peoples and Micronesians) who were incorporated into the empire in the early 20th century. The term was eventually used as race propaganda. After Japan's surrender in World War II, the term became antiquated for suggesting pseudoscientific racist notions that have been discarded in many circles. Ever since the fall of the Empire, Japanese statistics only count their population in terms of nationality, rather than ethnicity.

== Etymology ==
The Wajin (also known as Wa or Wō) or Yamato were the names early China used to refer to an ethnic group living in Japan around the time of the Three Kingdoms period. Ancient and medieval East Asian scribes regularly wrote Wa or Yamato with one and the same Chinese character 倭, which translated to "dwarf", until the 8th century, when the Japanese found fault with it, replacing it with 和 "harmony, peace, balance". Retroactively, this character was adopted in Japan to refer to the country itself, often combined with the character 大, literally meaning "Great".

The historical province of Yamato within Japan (now Nara Prefecture in central Honshu) borders Yamashiro Province (now the southern part of Kyoto Prefecture); however, the names of both provinces appear to contain the Japonic etymon yama, usually meaning "mountain(s)" (but sometimes having a meaning closer to "forest", especially in some Ryukyuan languages). Some other pairs of historical provinces of Japan exhibit similar sharing of one etymological element, such as Kazusa (<*Kami-tu-Fusa, "Upper Fusa") and Shimōsa (<*Simo-tu-Fusa, "Lower Fusa") or Kōzuke (<*Kami-tu-Ke, "Upper Ke") and Shimotsuke (<*Simo-tu-Ke, "Lower Ke"). In these latter cases, the pairs of provinces with similar names are thought to have been created through the subdivision of an earlier single province in prehistoric or protohistoric times.

Although the etymological origins of Wa remain uncertain, Chinese historical texts recorded an ancient people residing in the Japanese archipelago, named something like *ʼWâ or *ʼWər 倭. Carr surveys prevalent proposals for the etymology of Wa ranging from feasible (transcribing Japanese first-person pronouns waga 我が "my; our" and ware 我 "I; we; oneself") to shameful (writing Japanese Wa as 倭 implying "dwarf"), and summarizes interpretations for *ʼWâ "Japanese" into variations on two etymologies: "behaviorally 'submissive' or physically 'short'". The first "submissive; obedient" explanation began with the (121 CE) Shuowen Jiezi dictionary. It defines 倭 as shùnmào 順皃 "obedient/submissive/docile appearance", graphically explains the "person; human' radical with a shùnmàowěi 委 "bent" phonetic, and quotes the above Shi Jing poem. "Conceivably, when Chinese first met Japanese," Carr suggests, "they transcribed Wa as *ʼWâ 'bent back' signifying 'compliant' bowing/obeisance. Gestures of respect is noted in early historical references to Japan." Examples include "Respect is shown by squatting", and "they either squat or kneel, with both hands on the ground. This is the way they show respect."

Koji Nakayama interprets wēi 逶 "winding" as "very far away" and euphemistically translates Wō 倭 as "separated from the continent". The second etymology of wō 倭 meaning "dwarf (variety of an animal or plant species), midget, little people" has possible cognates in ǎi 矮 "low, short (of stature)", wō 踒 "strain; sprain; bent legs", and wò 臥 "lie down; crouch; sit (animals and birds)". Early Chinese dynastic histories refer to a Zhūrúguó 侏儒國 "pygmy/dwarf country" located south of Japan, associated with possibly Okinawa Island or the Ryukyu Islands. Carr cites the historical precedence of construing Wa as "submissive people" and the "Country of Dwarfs" legend as evidence that the "little people" etymology was a secondary development.

== History of usage ==
=== After Meiji restoration ===
==== Propaganda ====
Scientific racism was introduced from Western countries in the late 19th century. Despite the notion being hotly contested by Japanese intellectuals and scholars, the notion of racial homogeneity was used as propaganda due to the political circumstances of late nineteenth- and early twentieth-century Japan, which coincided with Japanese imperialism and World War II. Pseudoscientific racial theories, which included the belief of the superiority of the Yamato character, were used to justify military expansionism, discriminatory practices, and ethnocentrism. The concept of "pure blood" as a criterion for the uniqueness of the Yamato minzoku began circulating around 1880 in Japan, around the time some Japanese scientists began investigations into eugenics.

Initially, to justify Imperial Japan's conquest of Continental Asia, Imperial Japanese propaganda espoused the ideas of Japanese supremacy by claiming that the Japanese represented a combination of all East Asian peoples and cultures, emphasizing heterogeneous traits. Imperial Japanese propaganda started to place an emphasis on the ideas of racial purity and the supremacy of the Yamato race when the Second Sino-Japanese War intensified. Fuelled by the ideology of racial supremacy, racial purity, and national unity between 1868 and 1945, the Meiji and Imperial Japanese government carefully identified and forcefully assimilated marginalized populations, which included Okinawans, the Ainu, and other underrepresented non-Yamato groups, imposing assimilation programs in language, culture and religion.

According to Aya Fujiwara, a professor of history at University of Alberta, in an attempt to have some influence over the Japanese diaspora in Canada, Imperial Japanese authorities used the term Yamato as race propaganda during World War II, saying that:

"For Japanese-Canadians in particular, the Emperor was the most natural symbol to promote primordial national sentiment and superiority of the Yamato race—the term that the Japanese used to distinguish themselves from others. This term meant a noble race, the members of which saw themselves as "chosen people". The modernization of Japan, which began with the Meiji Restoration in 1868, produced a number of historical writings that tried to define the Japanese under the official scheme to create a strong nation. Imported to Canada by Japanese intellectuals, a "common myth of descent" that Japanese people belonged to the noble Yamato race headed by the Emperor since the ancient period was one of the core elements that defined Japanese-Canadian ethno-racial identity in the 1920s and the 1930s. The evolution and survival of an ethnic community, Anthony D. Smith argues, relies on the complicated "belief-system" that creates "a sacred communion of the people" with cultural and historical distinctiveness. During this period, Japanese intellectuals, scholars, and official representatives sought to keep Japanese Canadians within their sphere of influence, thereby reinforcing a transnational myth that would promote Japanese Canadians' sense of racial pride as God's chosen people in the world."

World War II and Holocaust historian Bryan Mark Rigg noted in 2020 how Yamato master race theory was included in government propaganda and schools in the decades leading up to World War II and how Gaijin were regarded in Japan as subhumans. Discrimination also occurred against non-Yamato races in Japan such as the Ainu and Ryukyuan peoples.

=== Contemporary usage ===
At the end of World War II, the Japanese government continued to adhere to the notions of racial homogeneity and racial supremacy, with the Yamato race at the top of the racial hierarchy. Japanese propaganda of racial purity returned to post-World War II Japan because of the support of the Allied forces. U.S. policy in Japan terminated the purge of high-ranking war criminals and reinstalled the leaders who were responsible for the creation and manifestation of prewar race propaganda.

In present-day Japan, the term Yamato minzoku may be seen as antiquated for connoting racial notions that have been discarded in many circles since Japan's surrender in World War II. "Japanese people" or even "Japanese-Japanese" are often used instead, although these terms also have complications owing to their ambiguous blending of notions of ethnicity and nationality.

In present-day Japan statistics only counts their population in terms of nationality, rather than ethnicity, thus the number of ethnic Yamato and their actual population numbers are ambiguous.

== Origin ==
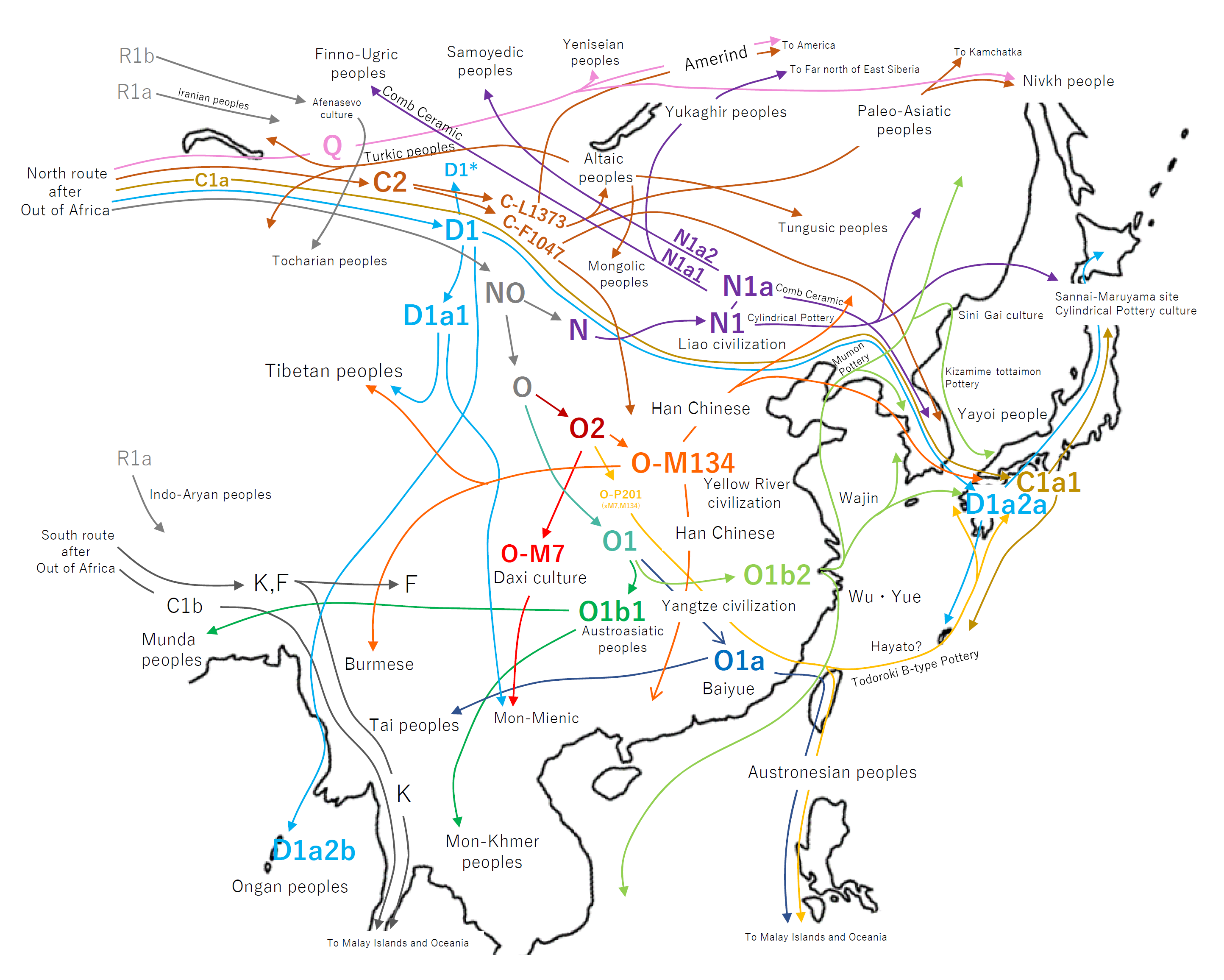
Proposed population migration routes into Japan, based on haplogroups

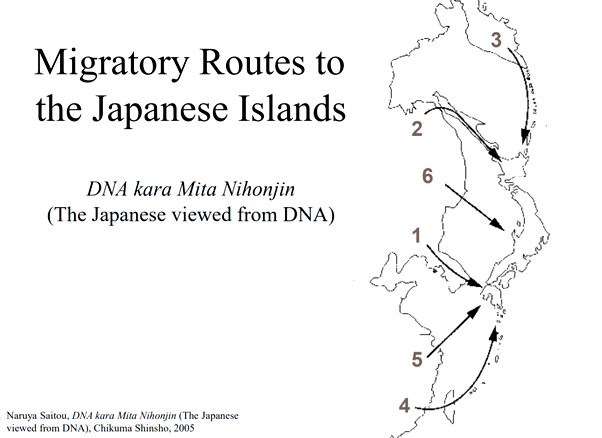
Migration routes into Japan during the Jōmon period

The earliest written records about Japanese people are from Chinese sources. These sources spoke about the Wa people, the direct ancestors of the Yamato and other Japonic agriculturalists. Early Chinese historians described the land of Wa as a land of hundreds of scattered tribal communities. Third-century Chinese sources reported that the Wa lived on raw fish, vegetables, and rice served on bamboo and wooden trays, clapped their hands in worship (something still done in Shinto shrines today), and built earthen-grave mounds. They also maintained vassal-master relations, collected taxes, had provincial granaries and markets, and observed mourning. The Wei Zhi (Chinese: 魏志), which is part of the Records of the three Kingdoms, first mentions Yamataikoku and Queen Himiko in the 3rd century. According to the record, Himiko assumed the throne of Wa, as a spiritual leader, after a major civil war. Her younger brother was in charge of the affairs of state, including diplomatic relations with the Chinese court of the Kingdom of Wei. When asked about their origins by the Wei embassy, the people of Wa claimed to be descendants of the people of Wu, a historic figure of the Wu Kingdom around the Yangtze Delta of China, however this is disputed. The Wa of Na also received a golden seal from the Emperor Guangwu of the Eastern Han dynasty. This event was recorded in the Book of the Later Han compiled by the Chinese historian Fan Ye in the 5th century AD. The seal itself was discovered in northern Kyūshū in the 18th century.

Archaeological evidence shows that Japonic speakers were first present in the southern and central regions of the Korean Peninsula. These peninsular Japonic-speaking agriculturalists were later replaced/assimilated by Koreanic-speakers, from southern Manchuria, likely causing the Yayoi migration and expansion within the Japanese archipelago. Whitman (2012) argues that the Yayoi agriculturalists were ethnically distinct from proto-Koreans and were present in the Korean peninsula during the Mumun pottery period. According to him, proto-Japonic languages arrived in the Korean peninsula around 1500 BC and was introduced to the Japanese archipelago by the Yayoi agriculturalists at around 950 BC, during the late Jōmon period. Koreanic languages arrived later from Manchuria to the Korean peninsula at around 300 BC and coexisted with the descendants of the Japonic Mumun cultivators (or assimilated them). Both had influence on each other and a later founder effect diminished the internal variety of both language families.

Overall, the most well-regarded theory is that present-day Japanese primarily descend from the Yayoi people and arguably, continental East Asian migrants from the Kofun period, and to a lesser extent, the pre-existing heterogenous Jōmon population in the Japanese archipelago.

=== Genetics ===
Overall, the Yamato Japanese are related to other modern East Asians with Koreans being their closest relatives. A 2024 study suggested modern Japanese people have on average about 12.4% total genetic contribution from the indigenous Jomon people who inhabited Japan prior to the arrival of the Yayoi farmers, though certain Japanese sub-groups, such as Okinawans, have higher Jōmon ancestry at 26.1%.

They are also related to Northern Han Chinese populations and are genetically intermediate between the continental clusters and the indigenous Ryukyuan/Jōmon clusters. One study models the Yamato Japanese as a mixture of Korean-related and Jōmon-related ancestries and states that they are more related to Yayoi individuals with notable Jōmon affinities instead of other continental East Asian populations. Other studies show that modern Yamato Japanese have ancestral components that peak in ancient Mongolians and Baikalians, which is shared by modern Koreans. In regards to Han Chinese subgroups, the Yamato Japanese are related to populations found in Inner Mongolia, Northeastern China (e.g. Liaoning, Shandong etc.) and Shaanxi. Among non-East Asians, the Yamato people show affinities with populations such as the Dingjie Sherpa people, Northeast Siberians and Oceanian populations. According to a 2025 study, ancient Liaodong populations significantly contributed to the genetic makeup of Japanese after the Warring States period.

== Relations with the Ryukyuans ==
Among the Japanese population, the Ryukyuans constitute one of the groups with a particularly distinct regional identity. Whether this group should be regarded as a subgroup of the Japanese ethnic population remains a matter of debate.

The people of the Ryukyu Islands are characterized by a genetic admixture between the ancient Jōmon people and the modern Japanese population, which itself emerged through the mixing of the Jōmon and Yayoi peoples. Compared with mainland Japanese, Ryukyuans retain a stronger Jōmon genetic component and preserve more archaic Japanese traits.

The Ryukyuan languages were also formed on the basis of Proto-Japonic, while later undergoing secondary influence from Japanese since the medieval period. As a result, their vocabulary and grammar preserve features that have disappeared from modern Japanese.

== See also ==
- Emperor of Japan
- Ethnic groups of Japan
- Japanese battleship Yamato
- Japanese nationalism
  - Minzoku (Volk)
  - Nihonjinron
- Race and ethnicity in Japan
- Yamabito
- Yamato (disambiguation)
- Yamato nadeshiko
- Yamato-damashii—"the Japanese spirit"
- Yamato period
