= Dr Sun Yat-sen Museum =

- 孫中山紀念館

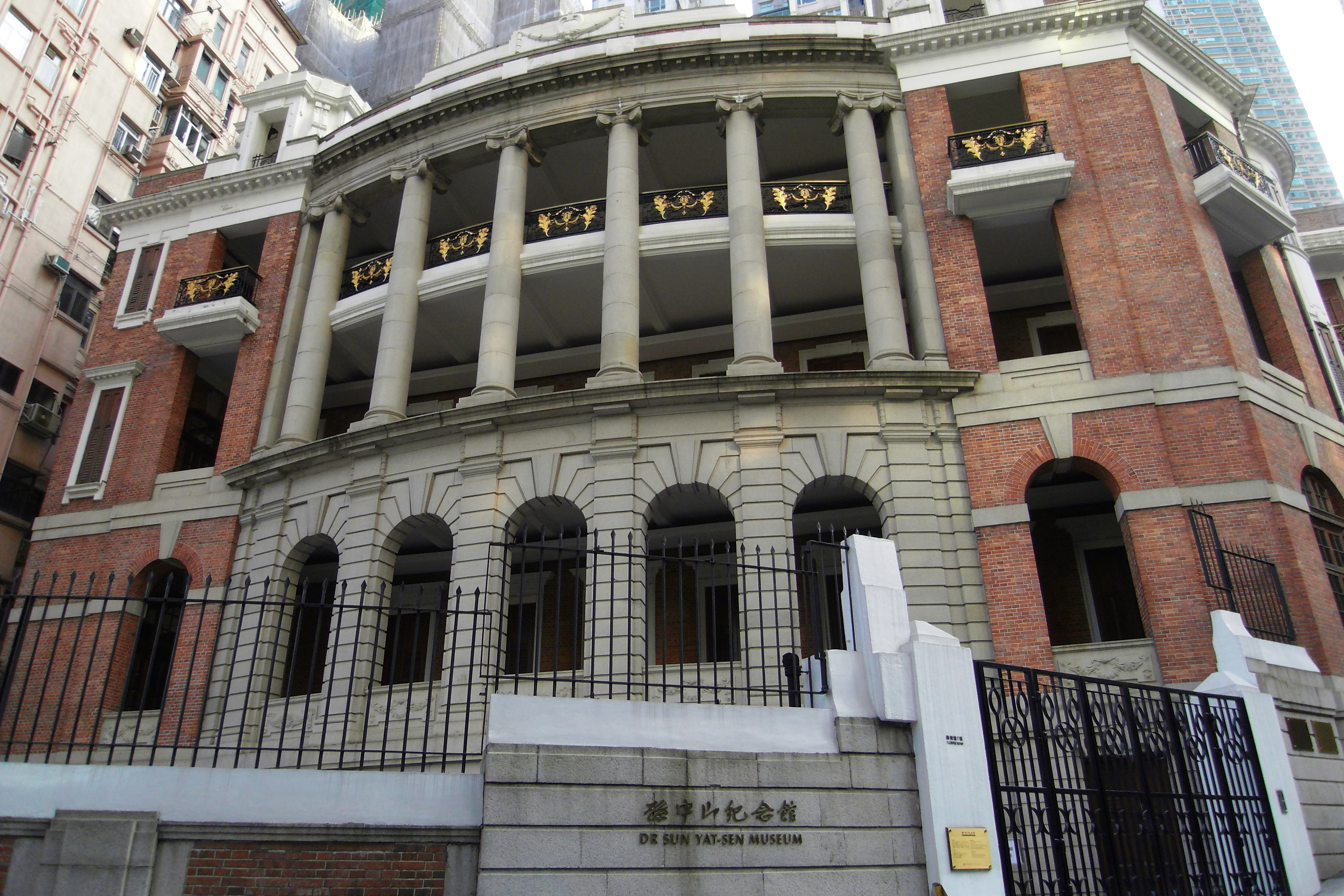
- The Museum in April 2011
- Established: 12 December 2006; 19 years ago
- Location: 7 Castle Road, Central, Hong Kong
- Coordinates: 22.281980°N 114.150766°E
- Type: History museum
- Visitors: 9,000 (2025)
- Curator: Humphrey Yuen Chi-tai
- Owner: Leisure and Cultural Services Department
- Public transit access: Central station (Exit D2); Sheung Wan station (Exit A2)
- Website: hk.drsunyatsen.museum

Dr Sun Yat-sen Museum
- Traditional Chinese: 孫中山紀念館
- Simplified Chinese: 孙中山纪念馆
Transcriptions
Standard Mandarin
- Hanyu Pinyin: Sūn Zhōngshān Jìniànguǎn
Yue: Cantonese
- Yale Romanization: Syūn Jūng sāan Géi nihm gún
- Jyutping: Syun1 Zung1 saan1 gei2 nim6 gun2

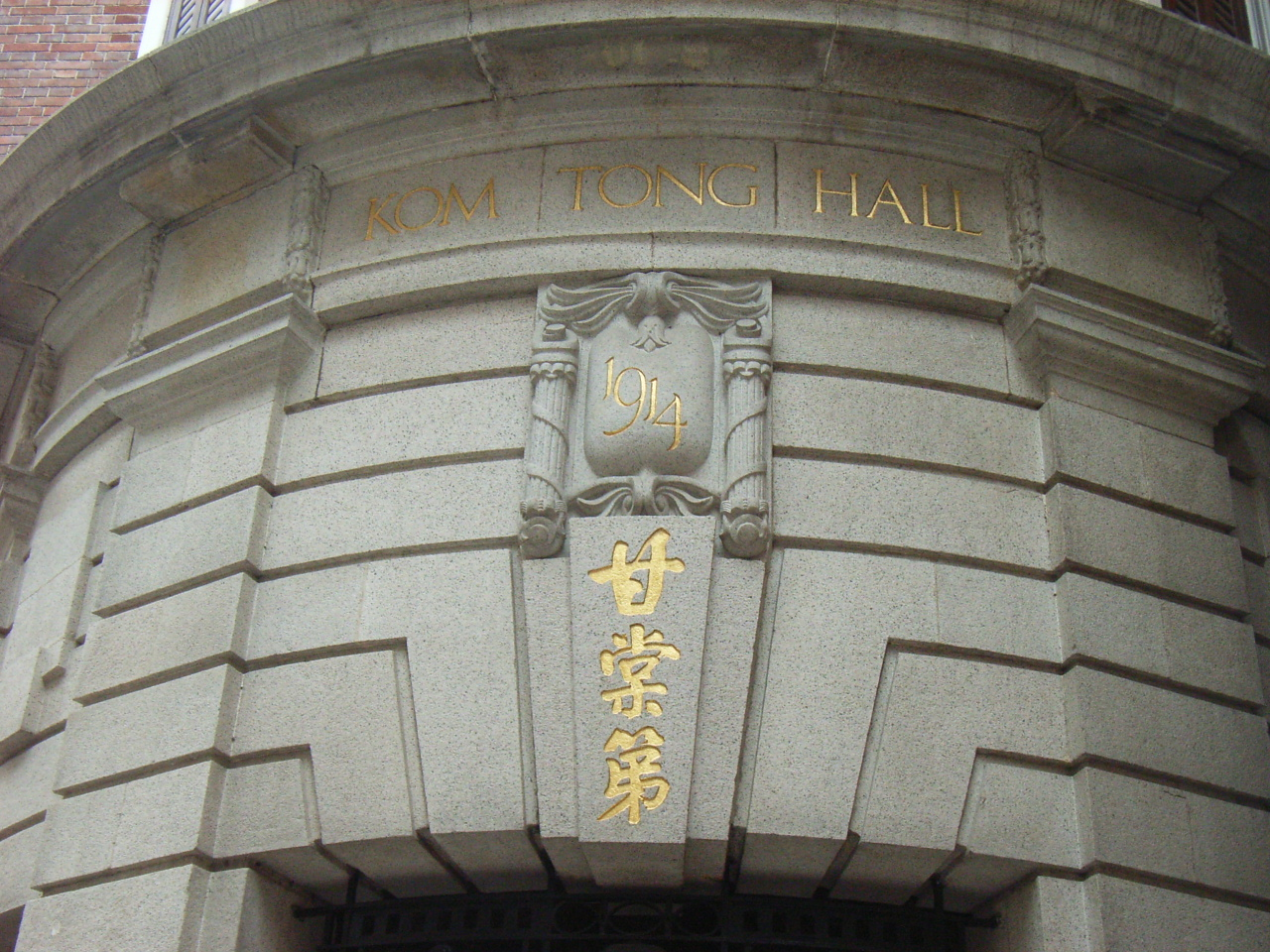
Kom Tong Hall

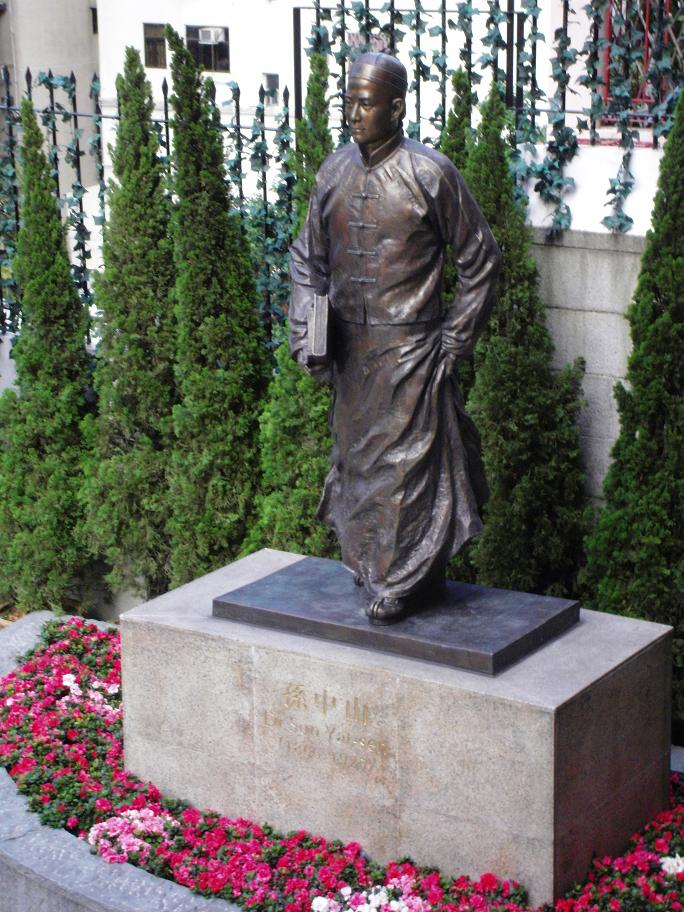
Statue of Sun Yat-sen outside the museum (sculpture by Chu Tat-shing)

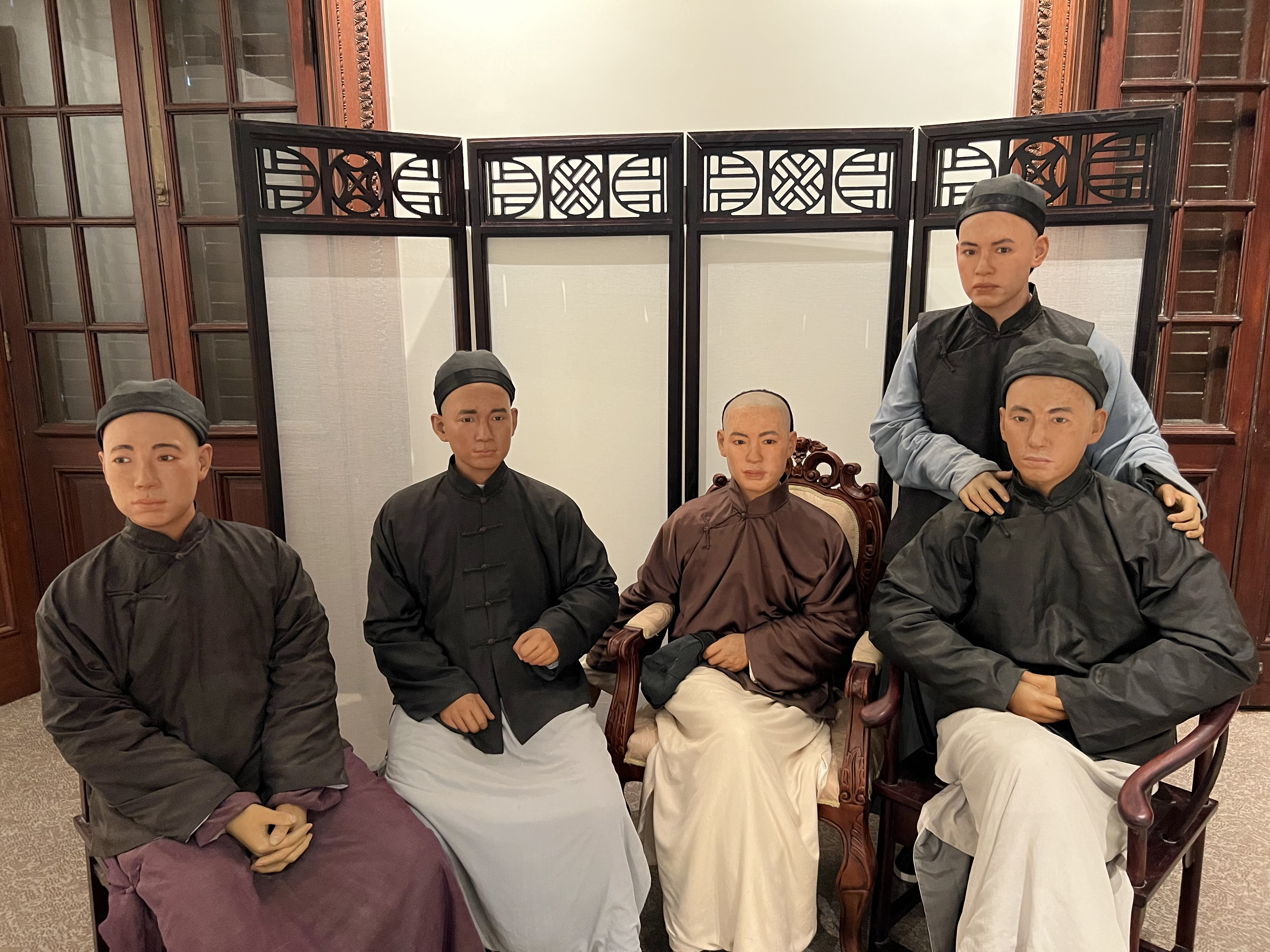
The Four Bandits (四大寇): Yeung Hok-ling, Sun Yat-sen, Chan Siu-bak and Yau Lit

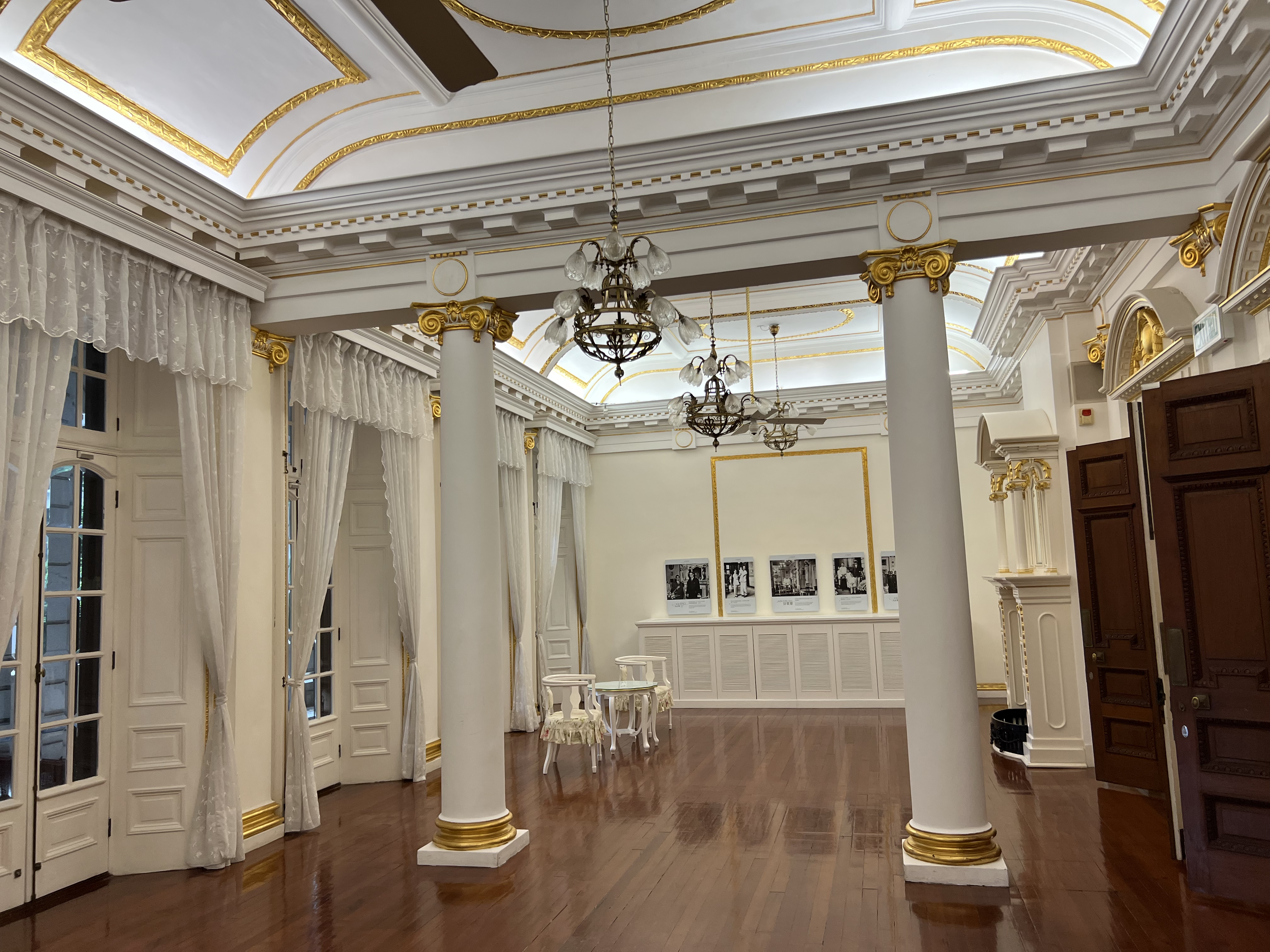
The White Hall

The Dr Sun Yat-sen Museum (SYSM) is a museum in Central, Hong Kong dedicated to the influential Chinese revolutionary and statesman Sun Yat-sen. It is located in Kom Tong Hall (Cantonese Yale: Gāmtòhngdaih), at 7 Castle Road, Central. After preparatory work undertaken by the Hong Kong Museum of History, which manages it as a branch museum, the SYSM opened to the public on 12 December 2006 to commemorate the 140th anniversary of Sun's birth.

== Introduction ==
Sun Yat-sen was a Chinese revolutionary statesman who had an instrumental role in the overthrowing of the Qing dynasty during the 1911 Revolution and the founding of the Republic of China.

Sun had a close relationship with Hong Kong, where he received his secondary and university education, nurtured revolutionary ideas, and organised revolutionary attempts. He established the headquarters of the Revive China Society in Hong Kong in 1894, and regarded the city as an important revolutionary base.

As Sun's activities in Hong Kong were mainly focused in the Central and Western District, Kom Tong Hall, being centrally located in the district, was considered most suitable for the setting up of a museum commemorating Sun. His spheres of activities fell within the vicinity of the Hall. This included the Preaching Home of American Congregational Mission on 2 Bridges Street where he was baptised, The Government Central School on 44 Gough Street where he received his secondary education, the To Tsai Church on 59 Hollywood Road where he frequently met with his comrades, the College of Medicine for Chinese at 81 Hollywood Road where he received his medical education, as well as the Qian Heng Hang at 13 Staunton Street where he set up the headquarters of the Revive China Society.

Moreover, Kom Tong Hall is situated adjacent to the Dr Sun Yat-sen Historical Trail, with various attractions of the trail in the vicinity. The Hall was also completed in 1914, close in time to the 1911 Revolution. Sun also had close relations with the original owner of the Hall, Ho Kom-tong. These factors also contributed to the selection of the Hall as the SYSM.

Admission to the museum is free and remains open on the anniversaries of Sun's birth and death on 12 November and 12 March respectively.

== Exhibitions ==
=== Permanent Exhibitions ===
Hong Kong in Dr Sun Yat-sen's Time details Sun's activities in Hong Kong and the city's role as a revolutionary pivot in the last years of the Qing.

Dr Sun Yat-sen and Modern China explains how he became a renowned revolutionary leader from an aspiring medical student, containing historical photos and artifacts.

=== Relics and artifacts on display ===
Relics and artifacts on display include Kwan King-leung's marriage certificate, bearing Sun's name as a witness, and a seal of "Long Live the Republic of China".

Other important relics include accessories from Sun's early years, an announcement of the election results of his provisional presidency, the imperial edict of Emperor Xuantong's abdication, and Sun's inscription to Huang Xing.

Several items are being showcased for the first time in years, such as Sun's answer sheet for an examination in the Hong Kong College of Medicine for Chinese, a dinner menu from the college's graduation ceremony, and a reply to Sun from the banished Hong Kong Colonial Secretary Stewart Lockhart.

== History of Kom Tong Hall ==
Kom Tong Hall is a historic building in Mid-Levels, Central. It was accorded a Grade I historic building status on 18 Dec 2009 and has been a declared monument since 12 November 2010.

The Hall was named after its first owner, Ho Kom-tong, who built the Hall in 1914 as a residence of his family. Ho was a younger brother of prominent philanthropist Sir Robert Ho Tung. The Ho family was the first Chinese family permitted to live in the Mid-Levels in the early colonial period.

During the Japanese invasion of Hong Kong in 1941, the Hall was used by the British Air Raid Precaution Association as an emergency station. The Japanese had attempted to occupy the building, but did not succeed.

Ho Kom-tong lived in the Hall until his death in 1950. The Hall remained the residence of Ho's descendants until 1959, when a rich merchant surnamed Cheng (or Chang) (Note: Two sources from the Government of Hong Kong provide different surnames. It is unclear which is correct.) purchased the building. Cheng (or Chang) sold the building to The Church of Jesus Christ of Latter-day Saints the next year in 1960.

The Church used the Hall for worship services and other local Church activities as well as for administration of its Asia-area humanitarian, building and other programs. As a result of Church growth, locally and throughout Asia over the last four decades, the Church's headquarters were moved out of Kom Tong Hall and into a much larger new 14-story building on Gloucester Road in Wan Chai, Hong Kong.

The Church no longer had need for the building and was looking to sell the property. It soon became apparent that a vacant lot would yield a far higher amount than if the property were sold intact, and the Church considered demolishing the building. In October 2002, the Church submitted an application for a demolition permit to the Building Authority. However, after hearing concerns raised by friends in the community, and a series of negotiations with the Hong Kong Government, Church officials reached a consensus in selling the property intact and preserving the building.

In February 2004, the government acquired the Hall for HK$53 million, and announced its plan to restore the building and convert it to a museum honouring Chinese revolutionary figure Sun Yat-sen, with a budget of HK$91.3 million. On 12 December 2006, the converted museum was officially opened to the public.

As a sign of appreciation from the government to the Church, Secretary for Home Affairs Patrick Ho Chi-ping arranged for the baptismal font to be preserved as a reminder to museum visitors of the Church's 44-year part in the building's history. In addition, a plaque on the front of the building displays the following:

"The Kom Tong Hall was the Hong Kong Headquarters of The Church of Jesus Christ of Latter-day Saints from 1960 to 2004. It was well preserved, leaving behind a cultural legacy that has been made available to the people of Hong Kong."

The retrofitted Hall has been made compatible with the Dr Sun Yat-sen Historical Trail in its vicinity and lets the general public reminisce the activities of Sun and his revolutionary comrades in their heyday.

== Relationship between Sun Yat-sen and Kom Tong Hall ==
Sun had never set foot at Kom Tong Hall, but he was related to the original owner of the premises, Ho Kom-tong, in other ways.

Both Sun and Ho were born in 1866 and graduated from The Government Central School in 1886. Ho's elder brother, Sir Robert Ho Tung, also rendered support to Sun's revolutionary activities.

Ironically though, Ho Kom-tong was in fact, like his elder brother Sir Robert Ho Tung before him, a compradore of Jardine Matheson. The firm had once dominated the opium trade and its director, William Jardine, had been instrumental in the British Parliament launching the Opium War against China. The firm had given up opium in the 1860s due to its declining profitability, which was well before Ho Kom Tong became involved with the firm. However, Jardine Matheson was still very much a symbol of British commercial penetration into China in an era of high imperial ambition. For instance, Jardine's involvement in the Kowloon-Canton Railway, a project designed to bring Canton into Britain's sphere of influence, was very much at cross purposes with the nationalist ideals of Sun, who very much wanted to maintain the territorial integrity of China.

When Sun left Shanghai for Guangzhou via Hong Kong, he called at Ho Tung's house on 18 February 1923. Two days later, Sun was accompanied by Ho Tung to Loke Yew Hall at the University of Hong Kong, where he was warmly received by the representatives of the university, including Ho Sai-kim, son of Ho Tung and chairman of the university's student union. Ho Sai-kim even sat beside Sun during the taking of a group photograph after the function.

== Architecture ==
Kom Tong Hall is built in the Composite Classical style popular during the Edwardian colonial period in Hong Kong, and is among the very few surviving structures in Hong Kong with a history of 90 years (as of 2005). Despite its Edwardian facade, it was probably the pioneer of high-rise buildings in Hong Kong. The Hall was among the earliest residential buildings in Hong Kong built with a reinforced concrete structure, and one of the first structures in Hong Kong built with a steel frame with concealed built-in electrical wiring.

The Hall has four storeys and occupies a total floor area of about 2,560 m^{2} (27,600 ft^{2}).

The facade of the Hall is surrounded by Greek-style granite columns. The Hall features red brick walls, granite dressings around the windows and doors, and ornate ironwork on the balconies.

Internally, the Hall is richly decorated with classical architectural features in the Baroque and Rococo styles: a grand staircase with carved wooden railings and ornamental balustrading runs from the basement to the second floor, the ceilings of the main rooms are ornately adorned with moulded plaster panels highlighted in gold leaf, while colourful stained-glass windows presenting Art Nouveau patterns of the period can be found along the main staircase and in other prominent locations. The Hall also features crystal chandeliers and wall lamps, hardwood wainscoting panels, fireplaces, patterned floor tiles, glazed wall tiles, and wooden louvre windows. The Hall also has a very deep veranda, which is a typical colonial building design used to regulate the climate in all seasons. The stained-glass windows, veranda, wall tiles, and staircase railings are all preserved intact. Inside the Hall are two flights of staircases, one at the front for use by the Ho family, and one at the back for use by mui tsai (maids). This feature reflects the idea of social stratification in Chinese societies.

== Other facilities ==
The museum has an exhibition and lecture hall, reading room, video rooms, interactive study rooms and an activity room. It also provides audio guides, school lectures, educational DVDs and travelling exhibition panels.

The museum offers electronic guides in Cantonese, Mandarin and English.

== Transportation ==
The museum is accessible from Exit A2 of Sheung Wan station and Exit D2 of Central station on the MTR.

== See also ==
- Dr Sun Yat-sen Historical Trail, near the museum
- Sun Yat Sen Memorial Park, Hong Kong
- Hung Lau, Hong Kong
- National Sun Yat-sen Memorial Hall, Taipei
- List of museums in Hong Kong
- Tourism in Hong Kong
