= History of Hong Kong =

The region of Hong Kong has been inhabited since the Old Stone Age, later becoming part of the Chinese Empire with its loose incorporation into the Qin dynasty (221–206 BC). Starting out as a farming fishing village and salt production site, it became an important free port and eventually a major international financial center.

The Qing dynasty ceded Hong Kong to the British Empire in 1842 in perpetuity through the Treaty of Nanjing, ending the First Opium War. Hong Kong then became a British crown colony. Britain also won the Second Opium War, forcing the Qing Empire to cede Kowloon in 1860, while leasing the New Territories for 99 years from 1898 to 1997.

Japan occupied Hong Kong from 1941 to 1945 during World War II. By the end of the war in 1945, Hong Kong had been liberated by British troops and returned to British rule. Hong Kong greatly increased its population from refugees from mainland China, particularly during the Korean War and the Great Leap Forward. In the 1950s, Hong Kong transformed from a territory of entrepôt trade to one of industry and manufacturing. China's reform and opening up prompted manufacturers to relocate to China, leading Hong Kong to develop its commercial and financial industry.

In 1984, as the New Territories lease was nearing expiration, British Prime Minister Margaret Thatcher signed the Sino-British Joint Declaration, which incited a wave of emigration from Hong Kong. The handover of Hong Kong on 1 July 1997 returned Hong Kong to Chinese rule, and it adopted the Hong Kong Basic Law.

In the 21st century, Hong Kong has continued to enjoy success as a financial centre. However, civil unrest, dissatisfaction with the government and Chinese influence in general has been a central issue. The planned implementation of Hong Kong Basic Law Article 23 caused great controversy and a massive demonstration on 1 July 2003, causing the bill to be shelved. Citizens expressed displeasure at their electoral system, culminating in the 2014 Hong Kong protests. In 2019, the proposed Hong Kong extradition bill was seen as another step taken by the Chinese Communist Party to undermine Hong Kong's rule of law, instigating a new wave of protests. In 2020, the National People's Congress passed the Hong Kong national security law to restore stability in the territory. The law was highly scrutinized by the pro-democracy faction and provoked further political pessimism among the populace.

== Prehistoric era ==
Archaeological findings suggesting human activity in Hong Kong date back over 30,000 years. Stone tools from the Old Stone Age have been excavated in Sai Kung at Wong Tei Tung. The stone tools were perhaps from a stone tool making ground from perhaps the Late Neolithic period or Early Bronze Age.

Evidence of an Upper Paleolithic settlement was found at Wong Tei Tung beside the Three Fathoms Cove in Sai Kung Peninsula. There were 6,000 artifacts found in a slope in the area and jointly confirmed by the Hong Kong Archaeological Society and Centre for Lingnan Archaeology of Sun Yat-sen University.

The Neolithic era began approximately 7,000 years ago in Hong Kong. The settlers in this area during that time were the Che people, who also settled on the coast of southern China. Excavations were mostly found on the western shores of Hong Kong. This location was most likely chosen to avoid strong winds from the southeast and to collect food from the nearby shores. Settlement can be found in Cheung Chau, Lantau Island and Lamma Island.

The Warring States period brought an influx of Yue people from the north into the area. Bronze fishing, combat, and ritual tools were excavated on Lantau Island and Lamma Island. Ma Wan was the earliest settlement with direct evidence in Hong Kong. The Yue people competed and assimilated with the indigenous Che people.

== Imperial China era (221 BC – 1841 AD) ==
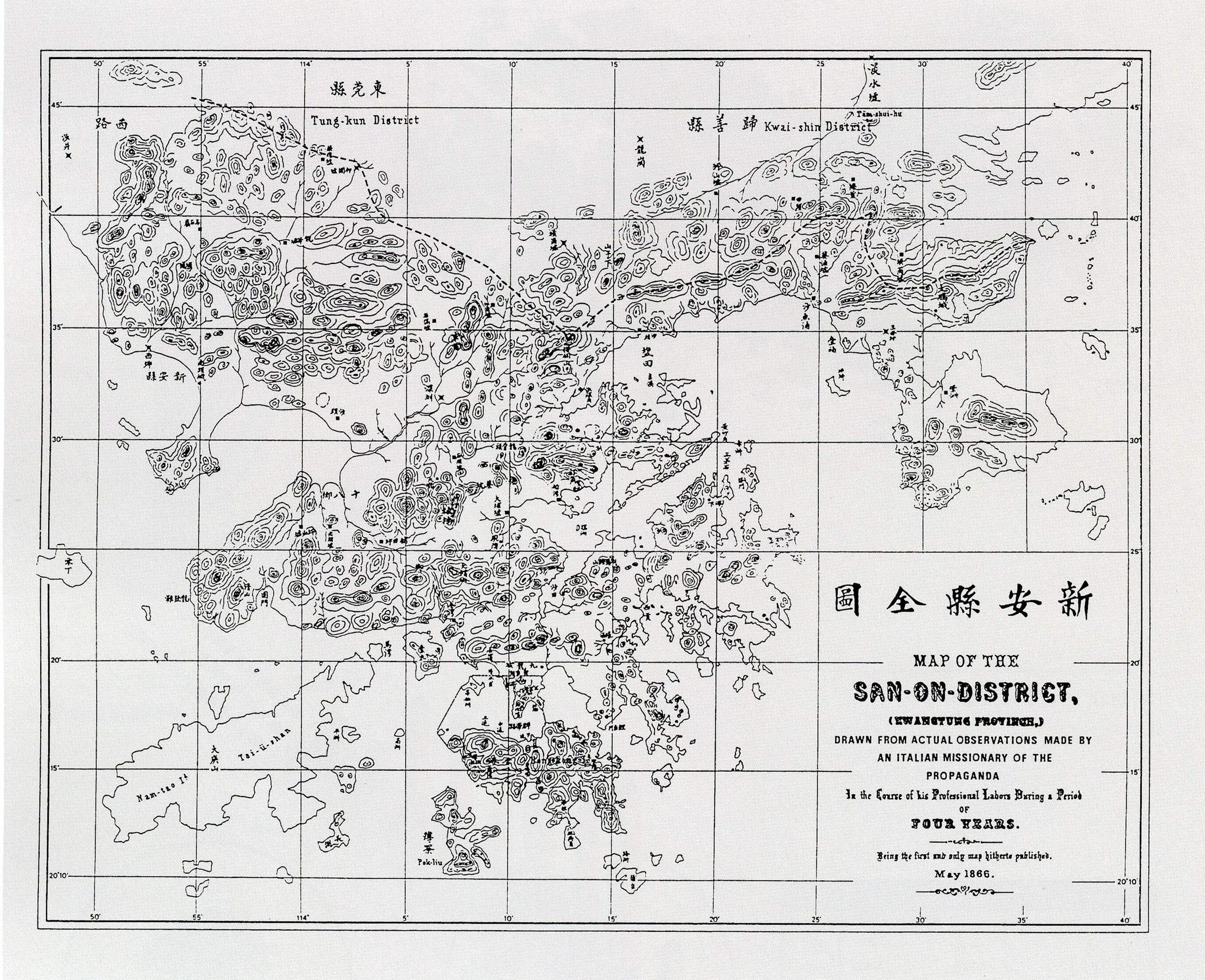
Map of Bao'an (Po On) County in 1866. It shows that Hong Kong and Shenzhen used to be a part of Bao'an County in the Qing dynasty

The territory was loosely part of China during the Qin dynasty (221–206 BC) and then Nam Viet (203–111 BC). During the Qin dynasty, the territory was governed by Panyu County until the time of the Jin dynasty. Archaeological evidence indicates that the population increased during the Han dynasty (206 BC – AD 220). In the 1950s, the tomb at Lei Cheng Uk from the Eastern Han dynasty (25–220 AD) was excavated and archaeologists began to investigate the possibility that salt production flourished in Hong Kong around 2,000 years ago, although conclusive evidence has not been found. Tai Po Hoi, the sea of Tai Po, was a major pearl hunting harbour in China from the Han dynasty through to the Ming dynasty (1368–1644), with activities peaking during the Southern Han (917–971).

During the Jin dynasty until the early Tang dynasty, Hong Kong was governed by Bao'an County. Under the Tang dynasty, the Guangdong region flourished as an international trading centre. The Tuen Mun region in what is now Hong Kong's New Territories served as a port, naval base, salt production centre and later as a base for the exploitation of pearls. Lantau Island was also a salt production centre, where riots by salt smugglers against the government broke out. From the middle of the Tang dynasty until the Ming dynasty, Hong Kong was governed by Dongguan County.

On 10 May 1278, Emperor Zhao Bing, the last Song dynasty emperor, was enthroned at Mui Wo on Lantau Island; this event is commemorated by the Sung Wong Toi memorial in Kowloon. After his defeat at the Battle of Yamen on 19 March 1279, the child emperor committed suicide by drowning with his officials at Mount Ya (modern Yamen Town in Guangdong). During the Mongol period, Hong Kong saw its first population boom as Chinese refugees enter the area. Most of these refugees were Chinese Song dynasty loyalists fleeing the Mongol conquest of Song China.

Despite the immigration, agricultural development remained sparse as the area was hilly and relatively barren. People had to rely on salt, pearl and fishery trades to produce income. Some clans built walled villages to protect themselves from the threat of bandits, rival clans and wild animals. The Qing dynasty Chinese pirate Cheung Po Tsai became a legend in Hong Kong. In the mid-17th century, after the Great Clearance policy which purged most of the region's population, under the Kangxi Emperor order, many Hakka people migrated from inland China to Xin'an County, which included modern Hong Kong.

During the Ming and Qing dynasties, Hong Kong remained under the governance of Xin'an County (renamed from Bao'an County), before it was colonised by the British. As a military outpost and trading port, Hong Kong's territory gained the attention of the world. Before the British colonised the New Territories and New Kowloon in 1898, Punti, Hakka, Tanka and Hoklo people had migrated to and stayed in Hong Kong for many years. They are the indigenous inhabitants of Hong Kong. The Punti and Hoklo lived in the New Territories while the Tanka and Hakka lived both in the New Territories and Hong Kong Island. British reports on Hong Kong describe the Tanka and Hoklo living in Hong Kong "since time unknown". The Encyclopaedia Americana describes Hoklo and Tanka as living in Hong Kong "since prehistoric times".

When the Union Jack was raised over Possession Point on 26 January 1841, as a result of the Convention of Chuenpi, signed by Charles Elliot and Qishan, the population of Hong Kong island was about 7,450, mostly Tanka fishermen and Hakka charcoal burners living in several coastal villages. In the 1850s large numbers of Chinese would emigrate from China to Hong Kong due to the Taiping Rebellion. Other events such as floods, typhoons and famine in mainland China would also play a role in establishing Hong Kong as a place to escape.

== Colonial era (1841–1930s) ==
Treaties and conventions between Britain and China related to Hong Kong
Date	Treaty	Outcome	Notes
20 January 1841	Convention of Chuenpi	Preliminary cession of Hong Kong Island to the United Kingdom	Included Green Island and Ap Lei Chau. Before the cession of Hong Kong Island, this territory was governed by Xin'an County .
29 August 1842	Treaty of Nanking	Cession of Hong Kong Island, founded as a crown colony of the United Kingdom	Included Green Island and Ap Lei Chau. Before the cession of Hong Kong Island, this territory was governed by Xin'an County .
18 October 1860	Convention of Beijing	Cession of Kowloon	South of Boundary Street, including Ngong Shuen Chau. Before the cession of Kowloon Peninsula, this territory was governed by Xin'an County.
1 July 1898	Second Convention of Beijing (Convention for the Extension of Hong Kong Territory)	Lease of the New Territories	South of the Shenzhen River in Xin'an County, including New Kowloon, Lantau and outlying islands.

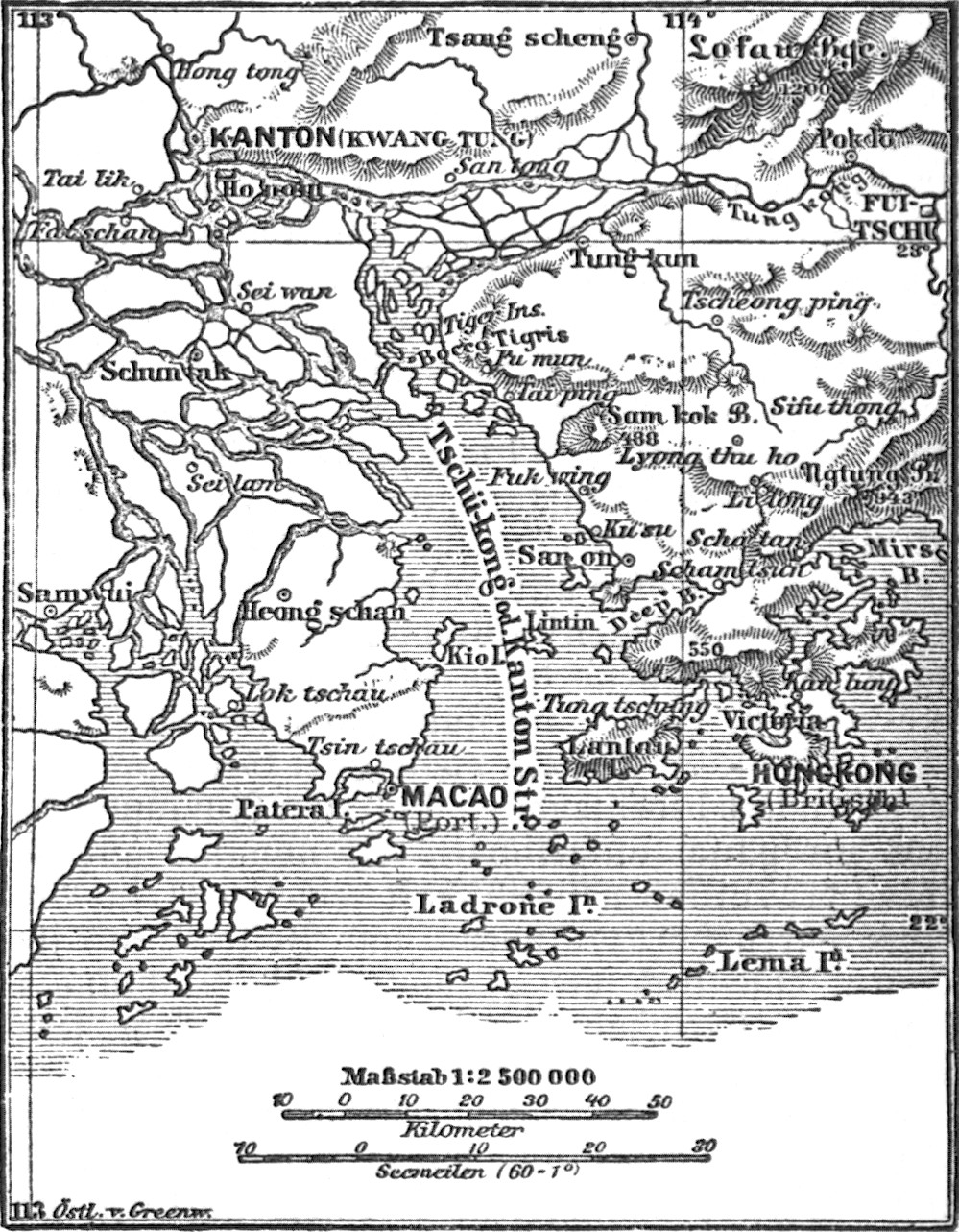
1890 German map of Hong Kong, Macau, and Canton (Guangzhou)

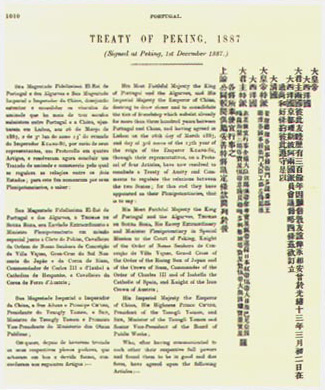
The Treaty of Peking

By the early 19th century, the British Empire trade was heavily dependent upon the importation of tea, silk, and porcelain from China. While the British exported to China luxury items such as clocks and watches, there remained an overwhelming imbalance in trade. China developed a strong demand for silver, which was a difficult commodity for the British to come by in large quantities. The counterbalance of trade came with exports to China of opium grown in India. By the late 19th century China grew most of the opium it used. A Chinese commissioner, Lin Zexu, voiced to Queen Victoria the Qing state's opposition to the opium trade. The First Opium War which ensued lasted from 1839 to 1842. Britain occupied the island of Hong Kong on 25 January 1841 and used it as a military staging point. China was defeated and was forced to cede Hong Kong in the Treaty of Nanking signed on 29 August 1842. The island became a crown colony of the British Empire.

Christian missionaries founded many schools and churches in Hong Kong. St Stephen's Anglican Church located in West Point was founded by the Church Mission Society in 1865. Ying Wa Girls' School located in Mid-levels was founded by the London Missionary Society in 1900. The Hong Kong College of Medicine for Chinese was founded by the London Missionary Society in 1887, and Sun Yat-sen was one of its first two graduates in 1892. The college was the forerunner of the School of Medicine of the University of Hong Kong, which was established in 1911.

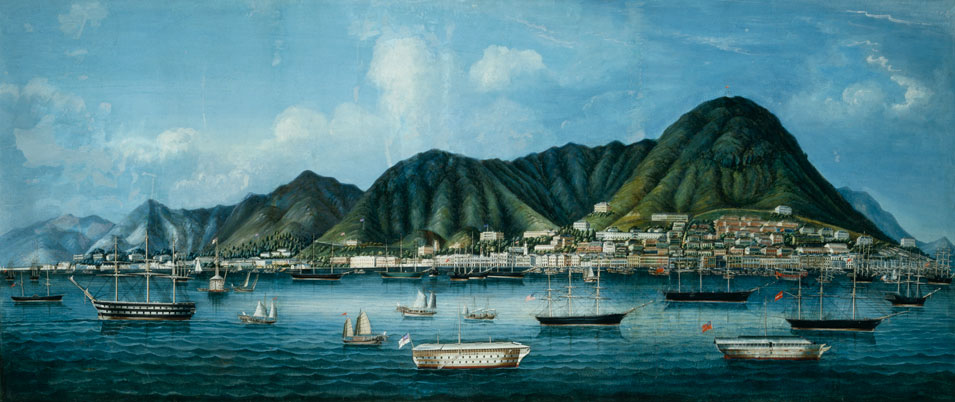
Victoria Harbour and Hong Kong Island in the 1860s

Along with fellow students Yeung Hok-ling, Chan Siu-bak and Yau Lit, Sun Yat-sen started to promote the thought of overthrowing the Qing empire while he studied in the Hong Kong College of Medicine for Chinese. The four students were known by the Qing as the Four Bandits. Sun attended To Tsai Church (道濟會堂, founded by the London Missionary Society in 1888) while he studied in this college. Sun led the 1911 Revolution, which changed China from an empire to a republic.

In April 1899, the residents of Kam Tin rebelled against the colonial government. They defended themselves in Kat Hing Wai, a walled village. After several unsuccessful attacks by the British troops, the iron gate was blasted open. The gate was then shipped to London for exhibition. Under the demand of the Tang clan in 1924, the gate was eventually returned in 1925 by the 16th governor, Sir Reginald Stubbs.

The first gas company opened in 1862. In 1890 came the first electric company. For local travel rickshaws gave way to buses, ferries, and trams. Imperial Airways set up a base in 1936. Every industry went through major transformation and growth. Western-style education made advances through the efforts of Frederick Stewart. This was a crucial step in separating Hong Kong from mainland China during the political turmoil associated with the falling Qing dynasty. The base of the future financial center was formed with the opening of The Hongkong and Shanghai Bank in 1865.

The Third Pandemic of Bubonic Plague attacked Hong Kong in the 1894 Hong Kong plague. It provided the pretext for racial zoning with the creation of Peak Reservation Ordinance and recognising the importance of the first hospital.

On the outbreak of World War I in 1914, fear of a possible attack on the colony led to an exodus of 60,000 Chinese. However, Hong Kong during World War I saw no direct military action, and Hong Kong's population continued to boom in the following decades from 530,000 in 1916 to 725,000 in 1925. Nonetheless, the crisis in mainland China in the 1920s and 1930s left Hong Kong vulnerable to a strategic invasion from Imperial Japan.

In 1937, Hong Kong was struck by a major typhoon.

== British lease of Kowloon and the New Territories ==
By 1990, the Kowloon Walled City contained 50,000 residents within its 2.6-hectare (6.4-acre) borders.

In 1860, at the end of the Second Opium War, the United Kingdom gained a perpetual lease over the Kowloon Peninsula, which is the mainland Chinese area just across the strait from Hong Kong Island. This agreement was part of the Convention of Beijing that ended that conflict.

During the second half of the 19th century, the British became increasingly wary of the Chinese-controlled islands surrounding their newly bought port. After the Second Opium War (1898, Convention for the Extension of Hong Kong Territory) the British negotiated a lease of the "New Territories" in which the British would receive newer outlying islands for 99 years.

On 19 December 1984, British Prime Minister Margaret Thatcher and Chinese Premier Zhao Ziyang signed the Sino-British Joint Declaration, in which Britain agreed to return not only the New Territories but also Kowloon and Hong Kong itself when the lease term expired. China promised to implement a "One Country, Two Systems" regime, under which for fifty years Hong Kong citizens could continue to practice capitalism and political freedoms forbidden on the mainland.

On 1 July 1997 (29 years ago), the lease ended, and the United Kingdom transferred control of Hong Kong and surrounding territories to the People's Republic of China.

== Japanese occupation era (1940s) ==
Hong Kong was occupied by Japan from 23 December 1941 to 15 August 1945. The period, called '3 years and 8 months' halted the economy. The British, Canadians, Indians and the Hong Kong Volunteer Defence Forces resisted the Japanese invasion commanded by Sakai Takashi which started on 8 December 1941, eight hours after the attack on Pearl Harbor. Japan achieved air superiority on the first day of battle and the defensive forces were outnumbered. The British and the Indians retreated from the Gin Drinker's Line and consequently from Kowloon under heavy aerial bombardment and artillery barrage. Fierce fighting continued on Hong Kong Island; the only reservoir was lost. Canadian Winnipeg Grenadiers fought at the crucial Wong Nai Chong Gap, which was the passage between the north and the secluded southern parts of the island.

On 25 December 1941, referred to as Black Christmas by locals, British colonial officials headed by the governor of Hong Kong, Mark Aitchison Young, surrendered in person at the Japanese headquarters on the third floor of the Peninsula Hotel. Isogai Rensuke became the first Japanese governor of Hong Kong.

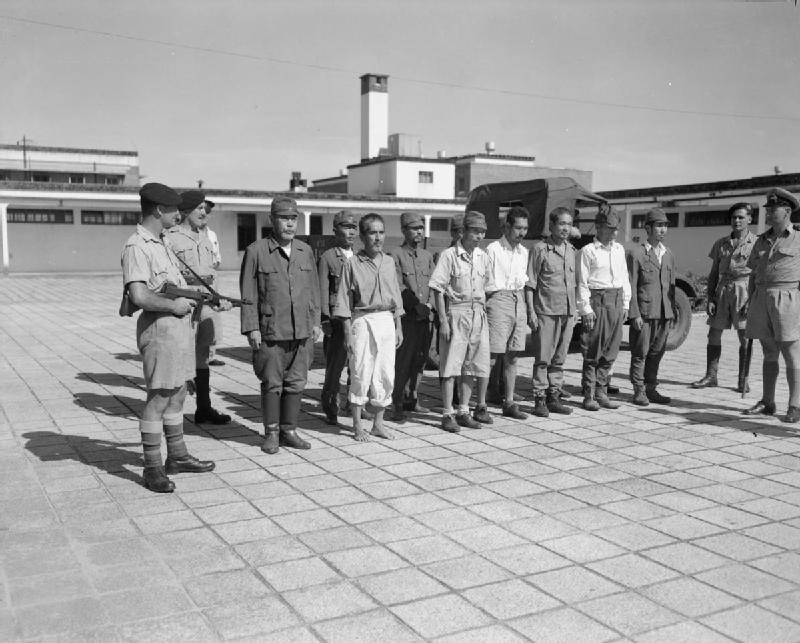
Japanese war criminals prepare for their transfer to Stanley Prison

During the Japanese occupation, hyper-inflation and food rationing became the norm of daily lives. It became unlawful to own Hong Kong dollars, which were replaced by the Japanese military yen, a currency without reserves issued by the Imperial Japanese Army administration. During the three and half years of occupation by the Japanese, an estimated 10,000 Hong Kong civilians were executed, while many others were tortured, raped, or mutilated. Philip Snow, a prominent historian of the period, said that the Japanese cut rations for civilians to conserve food for soldiers, usually to starvation levels and deported many to famine- and disease-ridden areas of the mainland. Most of the repatriated had come to Hong Kong just a few years earlier to flee the terror of the Second Sino-Japanese War in mainland China.

By the end of the war in 1945, Hong Kong had been liberated by joint British and Chinese troops. The population of Hong Kong had shrunk to 600,000; less than half of the pre-war population of 1.6 million due to scarcity of food and emigration. The communist revolution in China in 1949 led to another population boom in Hong Kong. Thousands of refugees emigrated from mainland China to Hong Kong, and made it an important entrepôt until the United Nations ordered a trade embargo on mainland China due to the Korean War. More refugees came during the Great Leap Forward.

== Post Japanese occupation ==
After the Second World War, the trend of decolonization swept across the world. Still, Britain chose to keep Hong Kong for strategic reasons. To consolidate its rule, constitutional changes, the Young Plan, were proposed in response to the trend of decolonization so as to meet the needs of the people. The political and institutional system made only minimal changes due to the political instability in mainland China at that time (aforementioned) which caused an influx of mainland residents to Hong Kong.

== Modern Hong Kong ==
=== Modern Hong Kong under British rule (1950s–1997) ===
==== 1950s ====
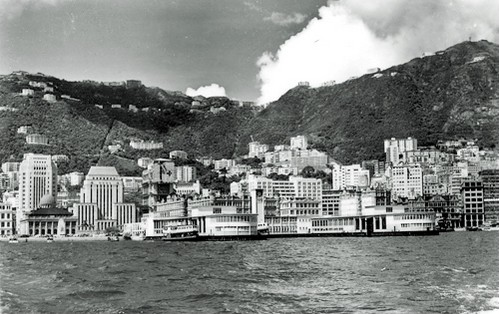
Victoria, Hong Kong, 1950s

Skills and capital brought by refugees of mainland China, especially from Shanghai, along with a vast pool of cheap labour helped revive the economy. At the same time, many foreign firms relocated their offices from Shanghai to Hong Kong. Enjoying unprecedented growth, Hong Kong transformed from a territory of entrepôt trade to one of industry and manufacturing. The early industrial centres, where many of the workers spent the majority of their days, turned out anything that could be produced with small space from buttons, artificial flowers, umbrellas, textile, enamelware, footwear to plastics.

Large squatter camps developed throughout the territory providing homes for the massive and growing number of immigrants. The camps, however, posed a fire and health hazard, leading to disasters like the Shek Kip Mei Fire. Governor Alexander Grantham responded with a "multi-storey buildings" plan as a standard. It was the beginning of the high-rise buildings. Conditions in public housing were very basic with several families sharing communal cooking facilities. Other aspects of life changed as traditional Cantonese opera gave way to big screen cinemas. The tourism industry began to formalise. North Point was known as "Little Shanghai" (小上海), since in the minds of many, it had already become the replacement for the surrendered Shanghai in China.

==== 1960s ====
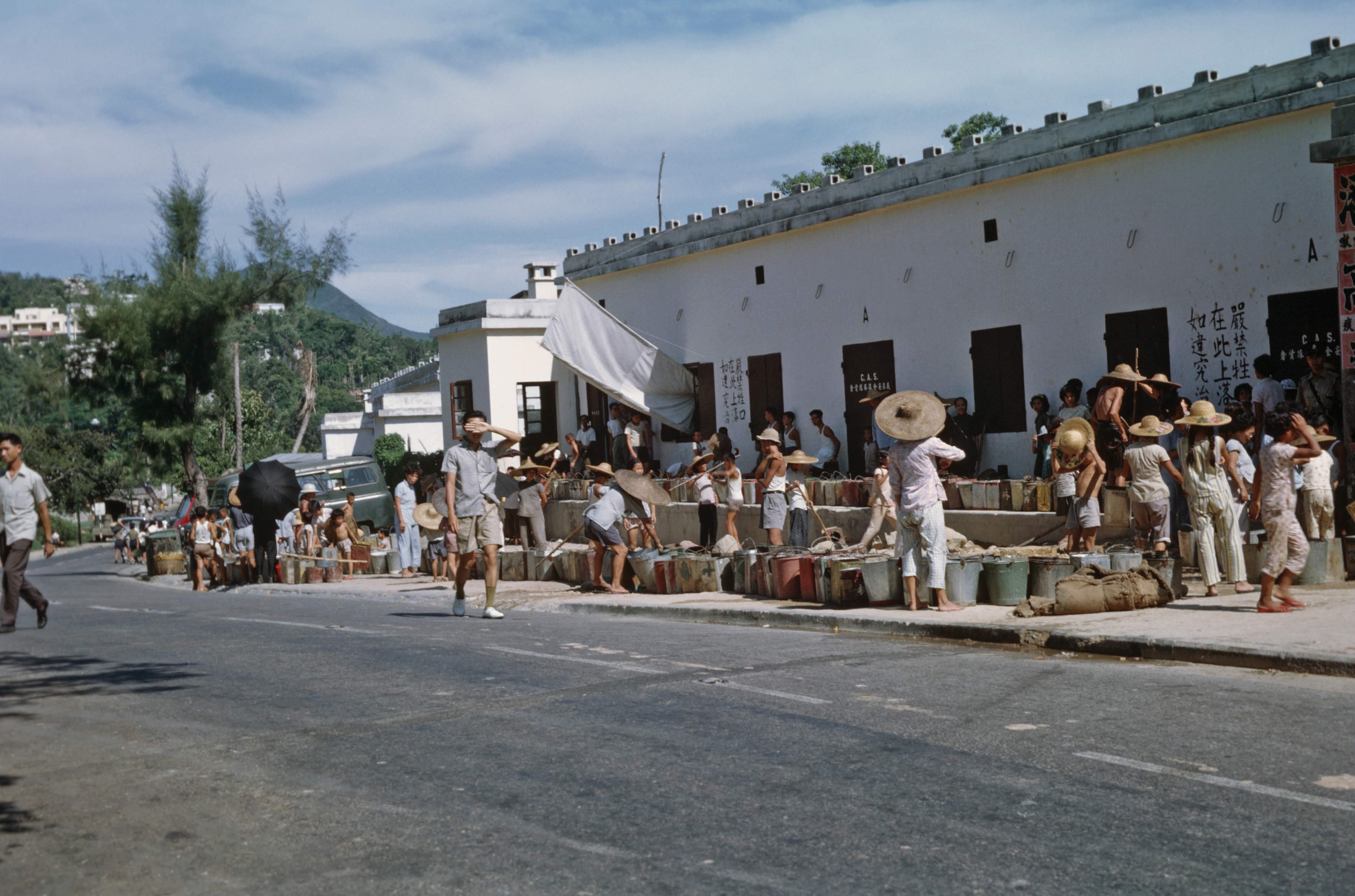
Queueing for water in Hong Kong, July 1963

The manufacturing industry opened a new decade employing large sections of the population. The period is considered a turning point for Hong Kong's economy. The construction business was also revamped with new detailed guidelines for the first time since World War II. While Hong Kong started out with a low GDP, it used the textile industry as the foundation to boost the economy. China's cultural revolution put Hong Kong on a new political stage. Events like the 1967 riot filled the streets with home-made bombs and chaos. Bomb disposal experts from the police and the British military defused as many as 8,000 home-made bombs. One in every eight bombs was genuine.

Family values and Chinese tradition were challenged as people spent more time in the factories than at home. Other features of the period included water shortages, long working hours coupled with extremely low wages. The Hong Kong Flu of 1968 infected 15% of the population. Amidst all the struggle, "Made in Hong Kong" went from a label that marked cheap low-grade products to a label that marked high-quality products.

==== 1970s ====
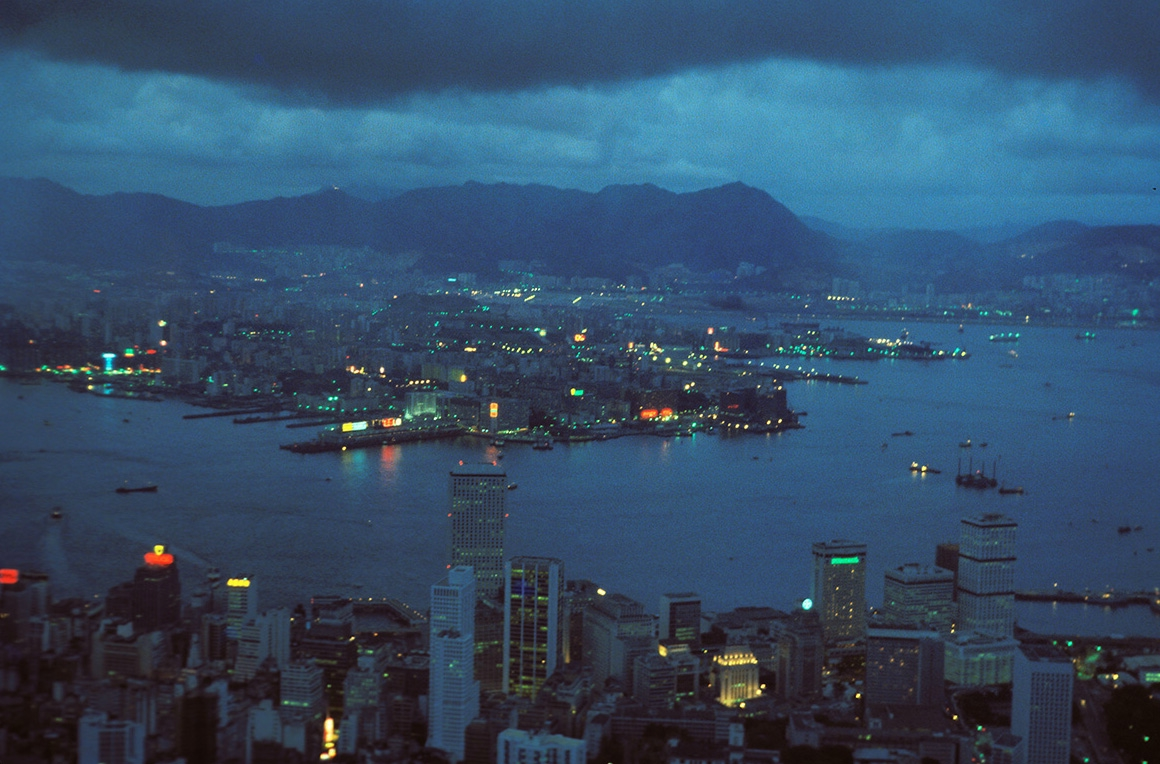
Kowloon City and Victoria, Hong Kong, 1970s

The 1970s saw the extension of government subsidised education from six years to nine years and the setup of Hong Kong's country parks system.

The opening of the mainland Chinese market and rising salaries drove many manufacturers north. Hong Kong consolidated its position as a commercial and tourism centre in Asia. High life expectancy, literacy, per-capita income and other socio-economic measures attest to Hong Kong's achievements over the last four decades of the 20th century. Higher income also led to the introduction of the first high-rise, private housing estates with Taikoo Shing. From this time, people's homes became part of Hong Kong's skyline and scenery.

In 1974, Murray McLehose founded the ICAC, the Independent Commission Against Corruption, to combat corruption within the police force. The corruption was so widespread that a mass police petition took place resisting prosecutions. Despite early opposition to the ICAC by the police force, Hong Kong was successful in its anti-corruption efforts, eventually becoming one of the least corrupt societies in the world.

The early 1970s saw legislation requiring equal pay and benefits for equal work by men and women, including the right for married women to be permanent employees.

==== 1980s ====
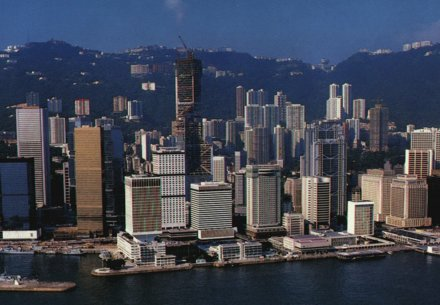
Victoria, Hong Kong, 1980s

In 1982, the British prime minister, Margaret Thatcher, hoped that the increasing openness of the PRC government and the reform and opening up in the mainland would allow the continuation of British rule. The resulting meeting led to the signing of Sino-British Joint Declaration and the proposal of the One country, two systems concept by Deng Xiaoping. But this time, Hong Kong was recognised as one of the wealthiest representatives of the far east. Political news dominated the media; while real estate took a major upswing, the financial world was rattled by panics, resulting in waves of changes in policy and Black Saturday. Warnings of the coming handover raised emigration levels to historic highs. Many left Hong Kong for the United States, Canada, the United Kingdom, Australia, Japan, and anywhere else in the world without any communist influence.

Hong Kong's Cinema enjoyed one run that put it on the international map. Some of the biggest names included Jackie Chan and Chow Yun-fat. The music world also saw a new group of cantopop stars like Anita Mui and Leslie Cheung.

==== 1990 to 1997 ====
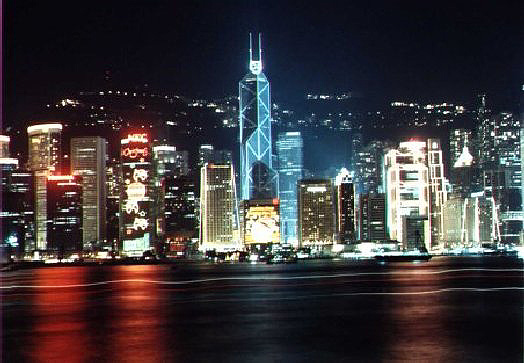
Victoria, Hong Kong, 1990s

On 4 April 1990, the Hong Kong Basic Law was officially accepted as the mini-constitution of the Hong Kong SAR after the handover. The pro-Beijing bloc welcomed the Basic Law, calling it the most democratic legal system to ever exist in the PRC. The pro-democratic bloc criticised it as not democratic enough. In July 1992, Chris Patten was appointed as the last British governor of Hong Kong. Patten had been the chairman of the Conservative Party in the United Kingdom until he lost his parliamentary seat in the general election earlier that year. Relations with the PRC government in Beijing became increasingly strained, as Patten introduced democratic reforms that increased the number of elected members in the Legislative Council. The PRC government viewed this as a breach of the Basic Law. On 1 July 1997, Hong Kong was handed over to the PRC by the United Kingdom. The old Legislative Council, elected under Chris Patten's reforms, was replaced by the Provisional Legislative Council elected by a selection committee whose members were appointed by the PRC government. Tung Chee Hwa assumed duty as the first chief executive of Hong Kong, elected in December by a selection committee with members appointed by the PRC government. He immediately reappointed the entire team of policy secretaries, guaranteeing significant continuity.

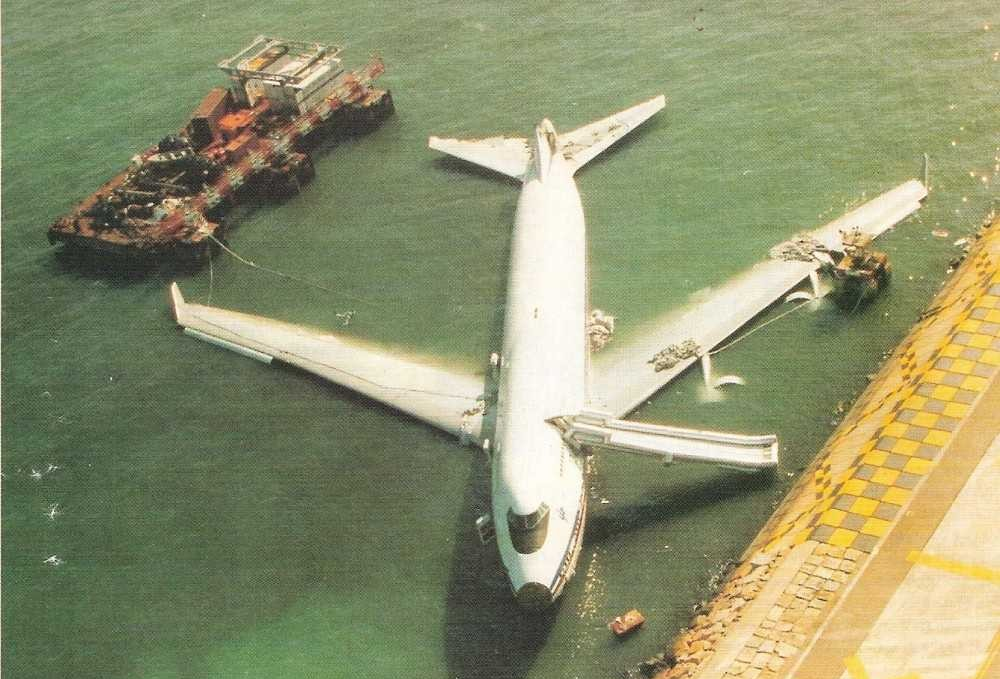
China Airlines Boeing 747 crash landed and ended up in the harbour.

Unchanged after 1997	Changed after 1997
1. The long-held British practice of no general elections by HK citizens remains unchanged.; 2. English is still taught in all schools. However, many schools teach in Cantonese and English.; 3. The border with the mainland continues to be patrolled as before.; 4. Hong Kong remains an individual member of various international organizations, such as the IOC, APEC and WTO.; 5. Hong Kong continues to negotiate and maintain its own aviation bilateral treaties with foreign countries and territories. Flights between Hong Kong and Mainland China are treated as international flights (although commonly known as inter-territorial flights in Mainland China).; 6. Hong Kong SAR passport holders have easier access to countries in Europe and North America, while mainland citizens do not. Citizens in Mainland China can apply for a visa to Hong Kong only from the PRC Government. Many former colonial citizens can still use British National (Overseas) and British citizen passports after 1997. (See British nationality law and Hong Kong); 7. It continues to have more political freedoms than Mainland China, including freedom of the press.; 8. Motor vehicles in Hong Kong, unlike those in Mainland China, continue to drive on the left. The last country or region to ever switch from left-hand traffic to right-hand traffic was Ghana (also a former British colony) in 1974.; 9. Electrical plugs (BS 1363), TV transmissions (PAL-I) and many other technical standards from the United Kingdom are still used in Hong Kong. However, telephone companies ceased installing British Standard BS 6312 telephone sockets in Hong Kong. See Technical standards in colonial Hong Kong; 10. Hong Kong retains a separate international dialling code (+852) and telephone numbering plan from that of the mainland. Calls between Hong Kong and the mainland still require international dialling.; 11. Hong Kong still uses the British date format.; 12. All statues of British monarchs like Queen Victoria and King George remain.; 13. Road names reflecting Britain's 156 years of control of the territory remain.	1. The chief executive of Hong Kong is now chosen by an Election Committee of 1200 members (it was initially 400, then 800), who are mainly elected from small professional sectors and pro-Chinese business groups in Hong Kong.; 2. All public offices now fly the flags of the PRC and the Hong Kong SAR. The Union Flag now flies only outside the British Consulate-General and other British premises.; 3. Elizabeth II's portrait disappeared from banknotes, postage stamps and public offices. As of 2023, some pre-1997 coins and banknotes are still legal tender and are in circulation.; 4. The 'Royal' title was dropped from almost all organisations that had been granted it, with the exception of the Royal Hong Kong Yacht Club.; 5. Legal references to the 'Crown' were replaced by references to the 'State', and barristers who had been appointed Queen's Counsel were now to be known as Senior Counsel.; 6. A local honours system was introduced to replace the British honours system, with the Grand Bauhinia Medal being the highest medal in the honour system and the Order of the Bauhinia Star replacing the Order of the British Empire.; 7. Public holidays changed, with the Queen's Official Birthday and other British-related occasions being replaced by PRC National Day and Hong Kong SAR Establishment Day.; 8. Many of the red British style pillar boxes were removed from the streets of Hong Kong and replaced by green Hongkong Post boxes in the Singapore style. A few examples remain but have been repainted.; 9. British citizens (without the right of abode) are no longer able to work in Hong Kong for one year without a visa; the policy was changed on 1 April 1997.; 10. The regional anthem of Hong Kong was changed from "God Save the Queen" (the national anthem of the United Kingdom of Great Britain and Northern Ireland) to "March of the Volunteers" (the national anthem of the PRC).; 11. Secondary schools must teach in Cantonese unless approved by the Education Bureau. Such schools are international schools, which teach in English. Secondary education will move away from the English model of five years secondary schooling plus two years of university matriculation to the Chinese model of three years of junior secondary plus another three years of senior secondary. University education extends from three years to four.

=== Chinese special administrative region (1997–ongoing) ===
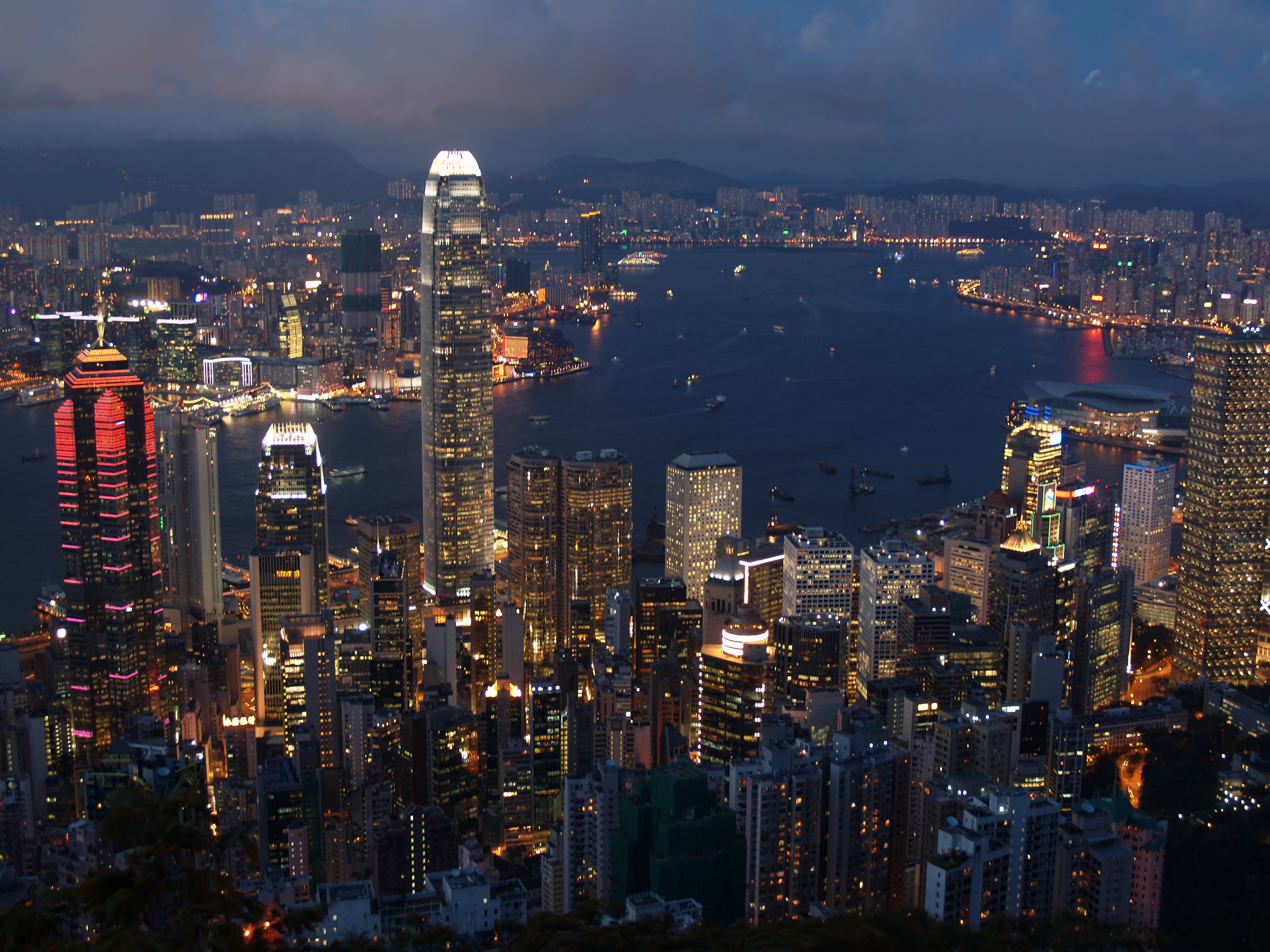
Southern Kowloon and Victoria, Hong Kong, 2000s

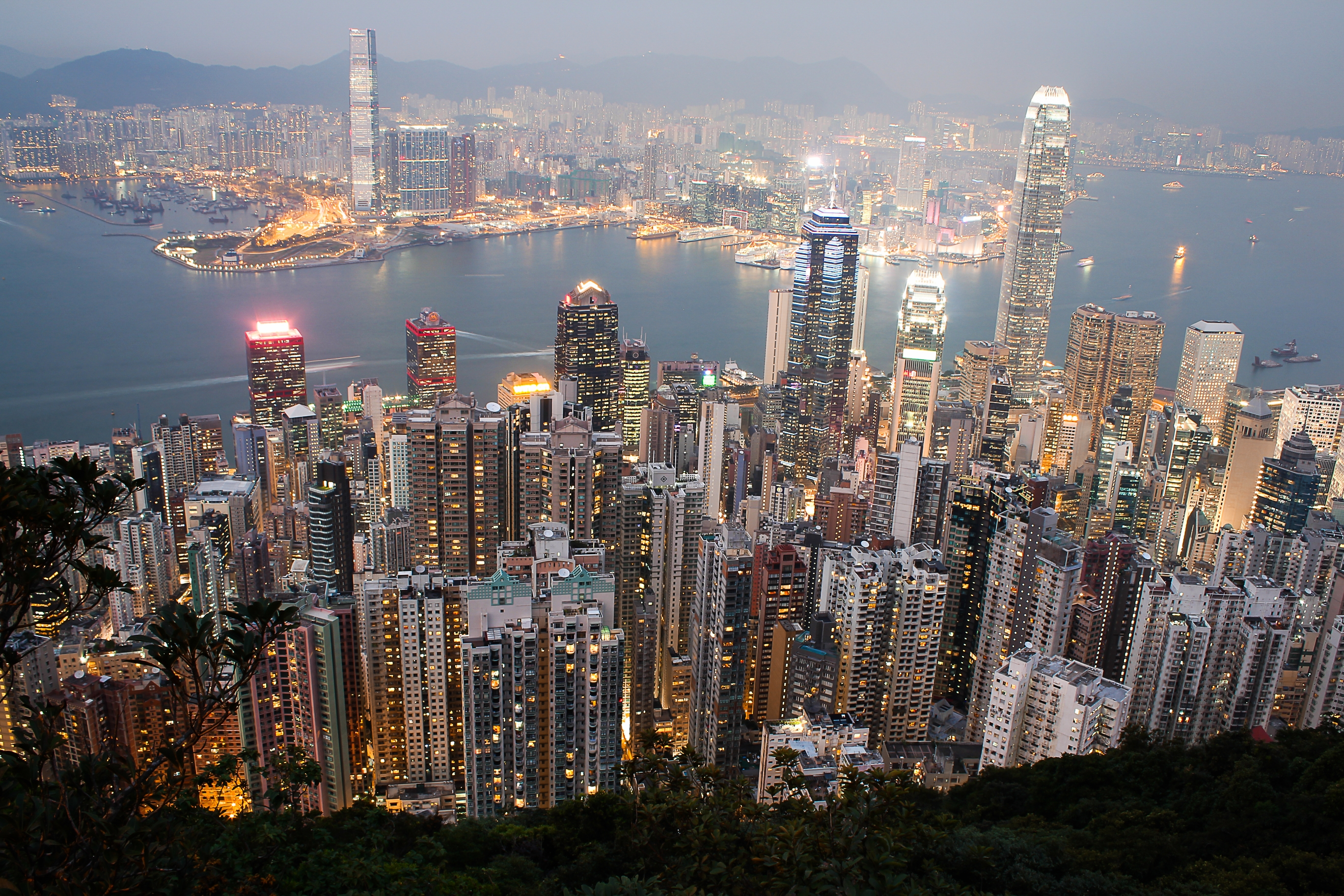
Southern Kowloon and Victoria, Hong Kong, 2014

Chinese communists portrayed the return of Hong Kong as key moment in the PRC's rise to great power status.

The new millennium signalled a series of events. A sizeable portion of the population that was previously against the handover found itself living with the adjustments. Article 23 became a controversy, and led to marches in different parts of Hong Kong with as many as 750,000 people out of a population of approximately 6,800,000 at the time. The government also dealt with the SARS outbreak in 2003. A further health crisis, the Bird Flu Pandemic (H5N1) gained momentum from the late 1990s, and led to the disposal of millions of chickens and other poultry. The slaughter put Hong Kong at the centre of global attention. At the same time, the economy tried to adjust fiscally. Within a short time, the political climate heated up and the chief executive position was challenged culturally, politically and managerially.

Hong Kong's skylines have continued to evolve, with three new skyscrapers dominating, each in Kowloon, Tsuen Wan, and Victoria, Hong Kong. The 415-metre-tall (1,362 ft) 88-storey Two International Finance Centre, completed in 2003, previously Hong Kong's tallest building, has been eclipsed by the 484-metre-tall (1,588 ft), 118-storey International Commerce Centre in West Kowloon, which was topped-out in 2010 and remains the tallest skyscraper in Hong Kong. Also worth mentioning is the 320-meter-tall (1,050-foot) Nina Tower located in Tsuen Wan. Eight additional skyscrapers over 250 meters (820 feet) have also been completed during this time.

Occupy Central with Love and Peace (OCLP; 讓愛與和平佔領中環 or 和平佔中) was a single-purpose Hong Kong civil disobedience campaign convened by Reverend Chu Yiu-ming, Dr Benny Tai Yiu-ting, and Chan Kin-man on 27 March 2013. Its aim was to pressure the PRC Government into reforming the systems for election of the Hong Kong chief executive and Legislative Council so as to satisfy "international standards in relation to universal suffrage" as promised in the 1984 Sino-British Joint Declaration and Article 45 of the 1997 Hong Kong Basic Law. Its manifesto called for occupation of the region's central business district if such reforms were not made. Upstaged by the Hong Kong Federation of Students (HKFS) and Scholarism in September 2014, its leaders joined in the Occupy Central protests.

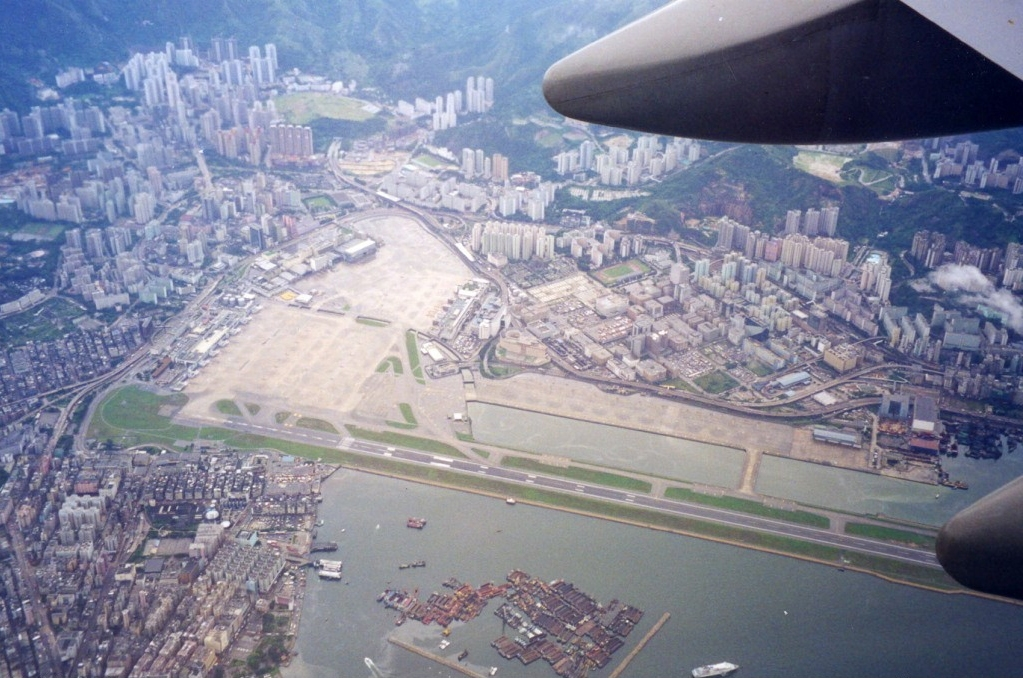
Hong Kong international airport was moved from Kai Tak to Chep Lap Kok. Photograph of Kai Tak taken the day after it closed.

The number of impoverished Hongkongers hit a record high in 2016 with one in five people living below the poverty line. Along with housing issues was growing sentiment over the influence of the Chinese Communist Party and Chinese culture. The anti-Hong Kong Express Rail Link movement protested at the proposed Hong Kong section of the Guangzhou–Shenzhen–Hong Kong Express Rail Link; the link was nevertheless completed in 2018. The Hong Kong 818 incident, inhibited by the visit of Li Keqiang, caused controversy regarding civil rights violations. The Moral and National Education controversy exemplified the conflict between communist and nationalist positions of China's government with democratic sentiments expressed by Hong Kong citizens.

The 2016 Legislative Council election saw the localists emerging as a new political force behind the pro-Beijing and pan-democracy camps by winning six seats in Hong Kong's geographical constituencies. However, six candidates were barred from contesting by the Electoral Affairs Commission, due to their association with the Hong Kong independence movement. Another six localist members who were elected were disqualified in the Hong Kong Legislative Council oath-taking controversy. After the 5th Hong Kong Chief Executive election, Carrie Lam became the first female chief executive of Hong Kong. However, her proposal of the Fugitive Offenders and Mutual Legal Assistance in Criminal Matters Legislation (Amendment) Bill 2019 has led to mass demonstrations against its implementation. The bill would make it legal for China to extradite criminals from Hong Kong, potentially including political prisoners. It is feared that the bill would cause the city to open itself up to the reach of mainland Chinese law and that people from Hong Kong could become subject to a different legal system.

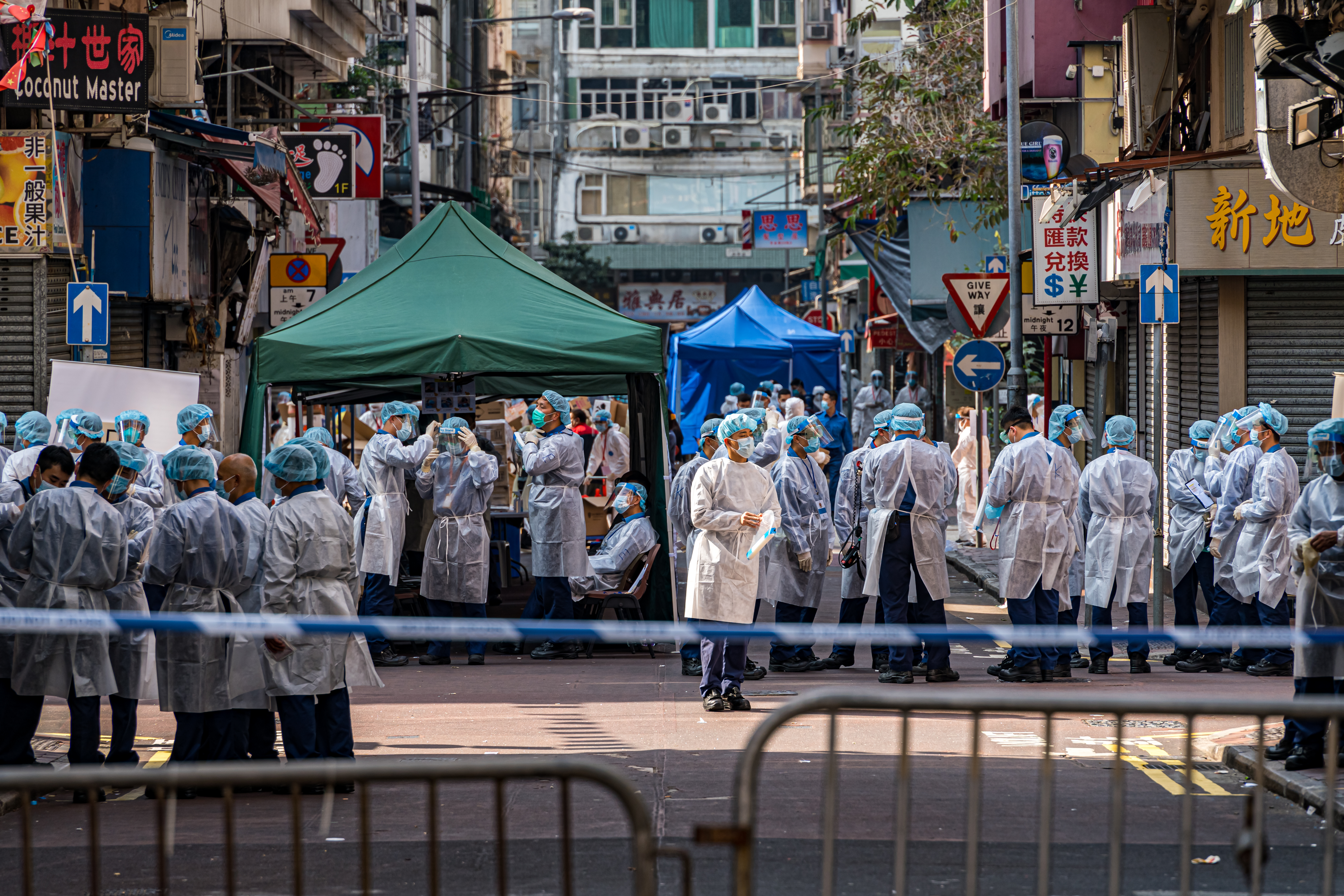
Healthcare workers conducting mass COVID-19 testing in Jordan

The COVID-19 pandemic in Hong Kong is part of the worldwide pandemic of coronavirus disease 2019 (COVID-19) caused by severe acute respiratory syndrome coronavirus 2 (SARS-CoV-2). The virus was first confirmed to have spread to Hong Kong on 23 January 2020. Confirmed cases were generally transferred to Princess Margaret Hospital's Infectious Disease Centre for isolation and centralised treatment. On 5 February, after a five-day strike by front-line medical workers, the Hong Kong government closed all but three border control points including Hong Kong International Airport, Shenzhen Bay Control Point, and Hong Kong–Zhuhai–Macau Bridge Control Point remaining open.

Hong Kong was relatively unscathed by the first wave of the COVID-19 outbreak and had a flatter epidemic curve than most other places, which observers consider remarkable given its status as an international transport hub. Furthermore, its proximity to China and its millions of mainland visitors annually would make it vulnerable. Some experts now believe the habit of wearing masks in public since the SARS epidemic of 2003 may have helped keep its confirmed infections at 845, with four deaths, by the beginning of April. In a study published in April 2020 in the Lancet, the authors expressed their belief that border restrictions, quarantine and isolation, social distancing, and behavioural changes such as wearing masks likely all played a part in the containment of the disease up to the end of March. Others attributed the success to critical thinking of citizens who have become accustomed to distrusting the competence and political motivations of the government, the World Health Organization, and the Chinese Communist Party.

After a much smaller second wave in late March and April 2020 caused by overseas returnees rushing to beat mandatory quarantine, Hong Kong saw a substantial uptick in COVID cases in July, with more than a hundred cases being reported several days in a row until early August. Experts attributed this third wave to imported cases – sea crew, aircrew members, and domestic helpers made up the majority of 3rd wave infections. In late November 2020 the city entered a fourth wave, called "severe" by Chief Executive Carrie Lam. The initial driver behind the fourth wave was a group of dance clubs in which wealthy, predominantly female Hong Kongers danced together and had dance lessons with mostly younger male dance instructors. Measures taken in response included a suspension of school classroom teaching until the end of the year, and an order for restaurants to seat only two persons per table and close at 10:00 p.m. taking effect on 2 December; a further tightening of restrictions saw, among other measures, a 6 pm closing time of restaurants starting from 10 December, and a mandate for authorities to order partial lockdowns in locations with multiple cases of COVID-19 until all residents were tested. From late January 2021, the government pursued repeatedly locked down residential buildings to conduct mass testing. A free mass vaccination program with the Sinovac vaccine and Pfizer–BioNTech vaccine was launched on 26 February. The government sought to counter the vaccine hesitancy by material incentives, which led to an acceleration of vaccinations in June.

Hong Kong was one of few countries and territories to pursue a "zero-COVID" elimination strategy, by essentially closing all its borders and, until February 2022, subjecting even mild and asymptomatic cases to hospitalisation, and sometimes isolation extending over several weeks. The fifth, Omicron variant driven wave of the pandemic emerging in late December 2021 caused the health system to be stretched to its limits, the mandatory hospitalization to be abandoned, and led several experts to question the zero-COVID strategy. Some even considered it counterproductive, due to it having nourished hopes that the city would eventually become free of the virus, and thus having led to a low COVID-19 vaccination rate in the city. Most of the deaths in the fifth wave were among the unvaccinated elderly.

The Standing Committee of the National People's Congress established the Hong Kong national security law which came into effect on 1 July 2020. In November 2020 the National People's Congress authorised the dismissal of any Legco members who are perceived to ask for help from foreign countries and who "refuse to recognise China's sovereignty over Hong Kong." After multiple pro-Democracy members of Legco resigned, the Government of the United Kingdom stated that the PRC was not upholding the Sino-British treaty.

On 27 January 2021, CCP general secretary Xi Jinping said that Hong Kong could only maintain its long-term stability and security by ensuring "patriots governing Hong Kong" when he heard a work report delivered by Carrie Lam. On 1 March, HKMAO director Xia Baolong in the seminar of "patriots governing Hong Kong" stated that Hong Kong must establish a "democratic electoral system with Hong Kong characteristics."

A "decision on improving the electoral system of the Hong Kong Special Administrative Region" was passed by the National People's Congress (NPC) on 11 March 2021 to rewrite the election rules in Hong Kong to ensure a system of "patriots governing Hong Kong," By amending the Annex I and Annex II of the Basic Law of Hong Kong, the composition of the Legislative Council (LegCo) and the Election Committee (EC). All electoral candidates of Chief Executive, Legislative Council Member, and Election Committee Member require prior approval from the Candidate Eligibility Review Committee.

On 23 June 2021, the pro-democracy tabloid Apple Daily announced that its final edition would be released on Thursday and that it would later cease activities after five top executives were arrested under the national security law and the tabloid's assets were frozen. Apple Daily founder Jimmy Lai is already imprisoned and awaits trial, along with 46 others, on subversion charges.

== See also ==
Flag of Hong Kong under British rule

Flag of Hong Kong under current Chinese rule

- History of Hong Kong (1800s–1930s)
- British nationality law and Hong Kong
- Secretary of State for War and the Colonies (1801–1854)
- Secretary of State for the Colonies (1768–1782 and 1854–1966)
- Secretary of State for Commonwealth Affairs (1966–1968)
- Secretary of State for Foreign and Commonwealth Affairs (since 1968)
- Governor of Hong Kong
- Declared monuments of Hong Kong
- Heritage conservation in Hong Kong
- List of museums in Hong Kong
- History of Macau
- Timeline of Hong Kong History
