= Anarchism in Hong Kong =

Anarchism in Hong Kong emerged as part of the Chinese anarchist movement, when many anarchists sought refuge from the Qing Empire in the territory. It grew alongside the Chinese revolutionary movement, before the territory again became a safe haven for anarchists, following the Communist victory in the Chinese Civil War. Since then anarchists have formed a part of the Hong Kong opposition movement, first to British colonial rule and then to the rising authoritarianism of the Government of Hong Kong.

== History ==
In 1841, Hong Kong was occupied by the British Empire, which made it into a crown colony. Hong Kong Island was officially ceded by the Qing Empire and the British-held territory was subsequently extended by the First and Second Conventions of Peking. Strikes against the British colonial administration broke out not long after the occupation started and continued throughout the 19th century, with many workers in Hong Kong ceasing their labour and returning to China in protest. Hong Kong also became a stronghold of revolutionary ideas among the Chinese population, now outside of the Qing dominion, where a group of students known as the "Four Bandits" (Yeung Hok-ling, Sun Yat-sen, Chan Siu-bak and Yau Lit) openly discussed the overthrow of the Qing dynasty. The Bandits, alongside the Chinese anarchist Zhang Renjie, were among the founding members of the Tongmenghui in 1905. Zhang went on to join the Hong Kong branch in 1907, after ensuring the removal of any mention of "heaven" from the organization's oath of allegiance.

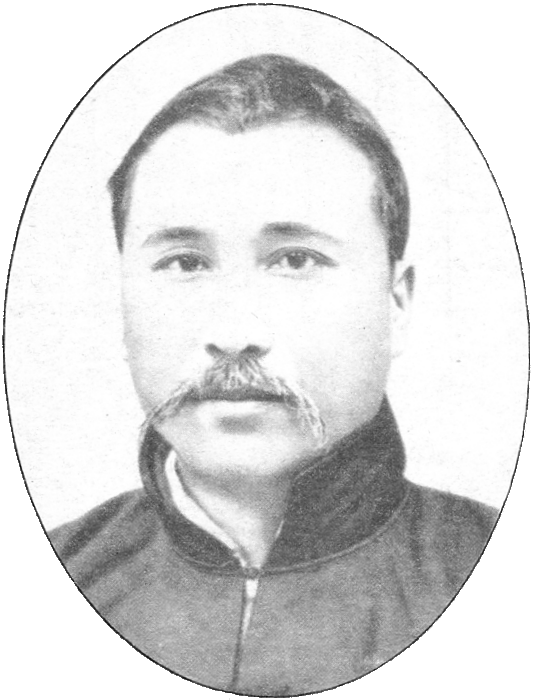
Chen Jiongming, a Cantonese anarchist and federalist leader that fled to Hong Kong from repression by the Kuomintang, where he later founded the Public Interest Party.

Liu Shifu had also moved to Hong Kong in 1906, where he became editor of a local journal. However, after a failed assassination attempt against military commander Li Chun, Liu was imprisoned for three years, only being released because his literature had impressed the local authorities. He returned to Hong Kong in 1909, where he and Chen Jiongming founded the Chinese Assassination Corps, an anarchist militant group dedicated to propaganda of the deed. With the outbreak of the 1911 revolution, Shifu returned to China, where the assassination corps continued their activities.

Chen Jiongming became instrumental in the organisation of the labour movement through South China, securing workers with the right to collective bargaining. During the Hong Kong Seamen's strike of 1922, despite the attempts of the British colonial authorities to suppress it, Chen helped to settle the strike, with employers capitulating to the demands of wage increases. After Chen's defeat in the Yunnan–Guangxi War, he fled to Hong Kong, where he continued to advocate for the unification of China from the bottom-up. Here he founded the Zhi Gong Party, which championed federalism in China and the establishment of a multi-party system, criticizing the single-party system of the Kuomintang.

After the outbreak of the May Thirtieth Movement, the Canton–Hong Kong strike took place, in which Chinese protestors called for a boycott of British Hong Kong and a general strike against the British colonial authorities. Around 250,000 Chinese people left the colony for Guangdong, causing the paralysis of Hong Kong's economy. During the strike, Zhang Renjie succeeded the recently deceased Sun Yat-sen as Chairman of the Kuomintang, bringing a distinctly anarchist leadership to the party alongside Li Shizeng, Wu Zhihui and Cai Yuanpei. However, Chiang Kai-shek began to rise to power within the Kuomintang and deposed the "Four Elders", marking a shift to the right-wing inside the party. Chiang initiated the Shanghai massacre, during which thousands of leftists were killed, beginning the Chinese Civil War.

After the Japanese invasion of Manchuria, Chen Jiongming and the Zhi Gong Party criticized Chiang Kai-shek's nationalist government for its refusal to confront the Empire of Japan and organized a boycott of Japanese products in Hong Kong. However, after Chen's death and the Japanese occupation of Hong Kong, the party was nearly wiped out and began to turn towards Marxism-Leninism after the end of World War II.

Following the end of the Chinese Civil War and the proclamation of the People's Republic of China in 1949, many anarchists fled to Hong Kong. Despite escalating violence between nationalists and communists in Hong Kong, the colony soon became a safe haven for people fleeing from the repression of the People's Republic of China, with about 60,000 refugees moving to the island during the Great Leap Forward.

The Black Bauhinia Flag, a variation of the flag of Hong Kong.

In 1969, Hong Kong's student movement began to become disillusioned with the Chinese Communist Party due to the events of the Cultural Revolution and the 1967 Hong Kong riots, with many students at Chu Hai College being attracted to anarchist and Trotskyist tendencies. From this movement and 1970s Hong Kong student protests, a libertarian socialist organization, the 70s Front, emerged. It agitated both against the British colonial administration and the Chinese Communist Party, publishing the Chinese language 70s Bi-weekly and the English language Minus magazines. However, ideological conflicts between the Trotskyists and anarchists led to a split in the organization, with many Trotskyists leaving to form the Revolutionary Marxist League. This led to the group's dissolution in the early 1980s.

The rise of Deng Xiaoping to power in China brought about a wave of economic liberalisation known as "socialism with Chinese characteristics". The new regime signed a declaration that secured the handover of Hong Kong to the People's Republic of China. The Hong Kong left-wing was subsequently split between the pro-democracy and pro-Beijing camps. Anarchist collectives, such as Autonomous 8A, began to form part of the broad opposition movement. Anarchists have since participated in a number of actions against rising authoritarianism in Hong Kong, including Occupy Central, the Umbrella Revolution and Anti-Extradition Law Amendment Bill Movement.

== See also ==
- List of anarchist movements by region
- Anarchism in China
- United front in Hong Kong

=== Other ideologies in Hong Kong ===
- Centrism in Hong Kong
- Conservatism in Hong Kong
- Liberalism in Hong Kong
- Localism in Hong Kong
- Socialism in Hong Kong
