= Kau Kee Restaurant =

Noodle restaurant in Hong Kong

Coordinates: 22.284230°N 114.152522°E

Kau Kee Restaurant (九記牛腩)
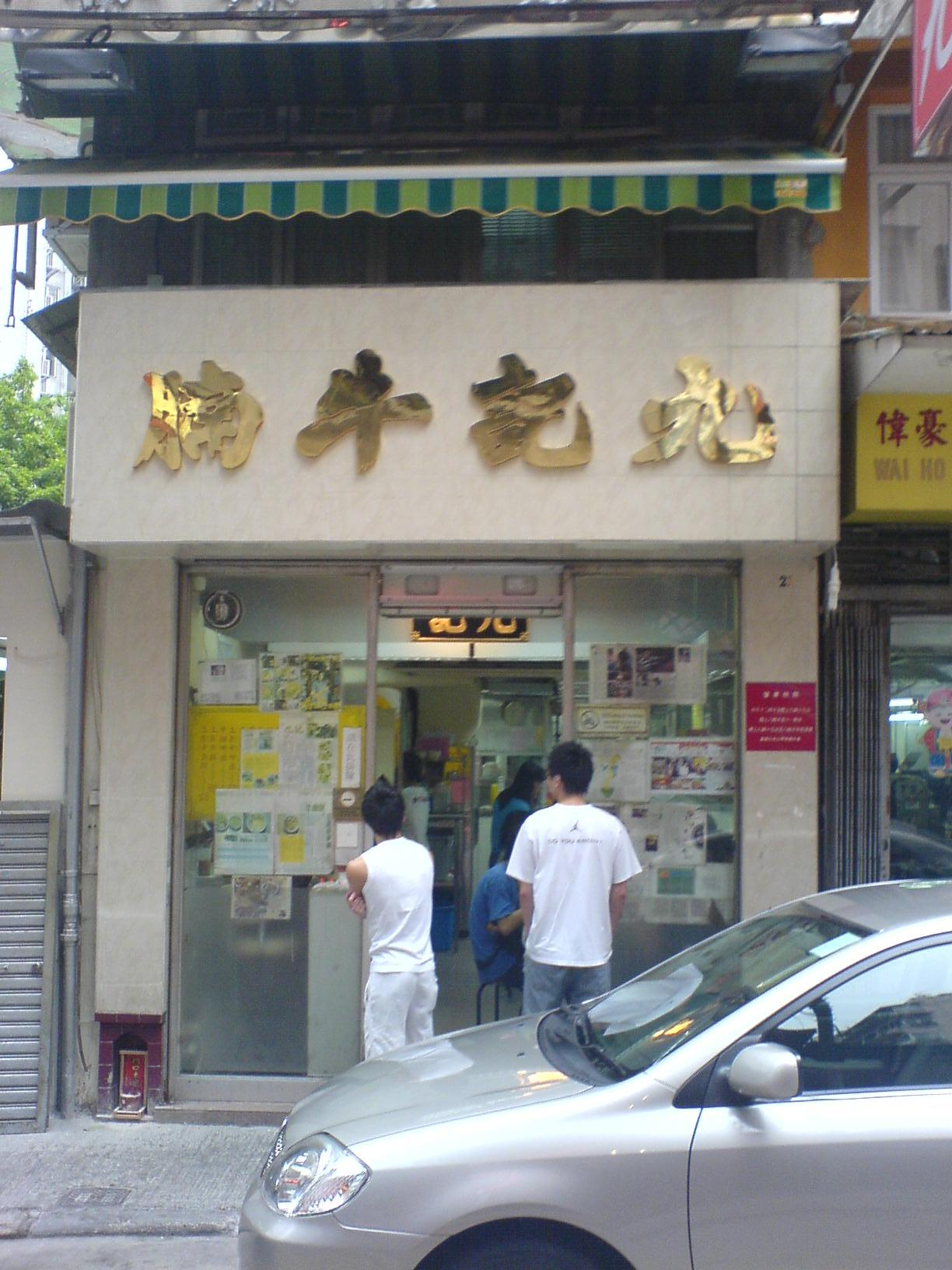
- Interactive map of Kau Kee Restaurant (九記牛腩)

Restaurant information
- Food type: Chinese: beef brisket soup noodles
- Location: 21 Gough Street, Sheung Wan, Hong Kong, China

Kau Kee Restaurant (Chinese: 九記牛腩) is a noodle restaurant in Hong Kong. Its speciality is beef brisket soup with noodles. On his website, the television food personality Andrew Zimmern has noted, "If I had only one meal in all of Hong Kong, it would be at Kau Kee." Writer Mark Rozzo described Kau Kee as "the noodle shop with perhaps the biggest cult following in the world."
