= Gough Street =

Street on Sheung Wan, Hong Kong

Coordinates: 22.28414°N 114.15277°E

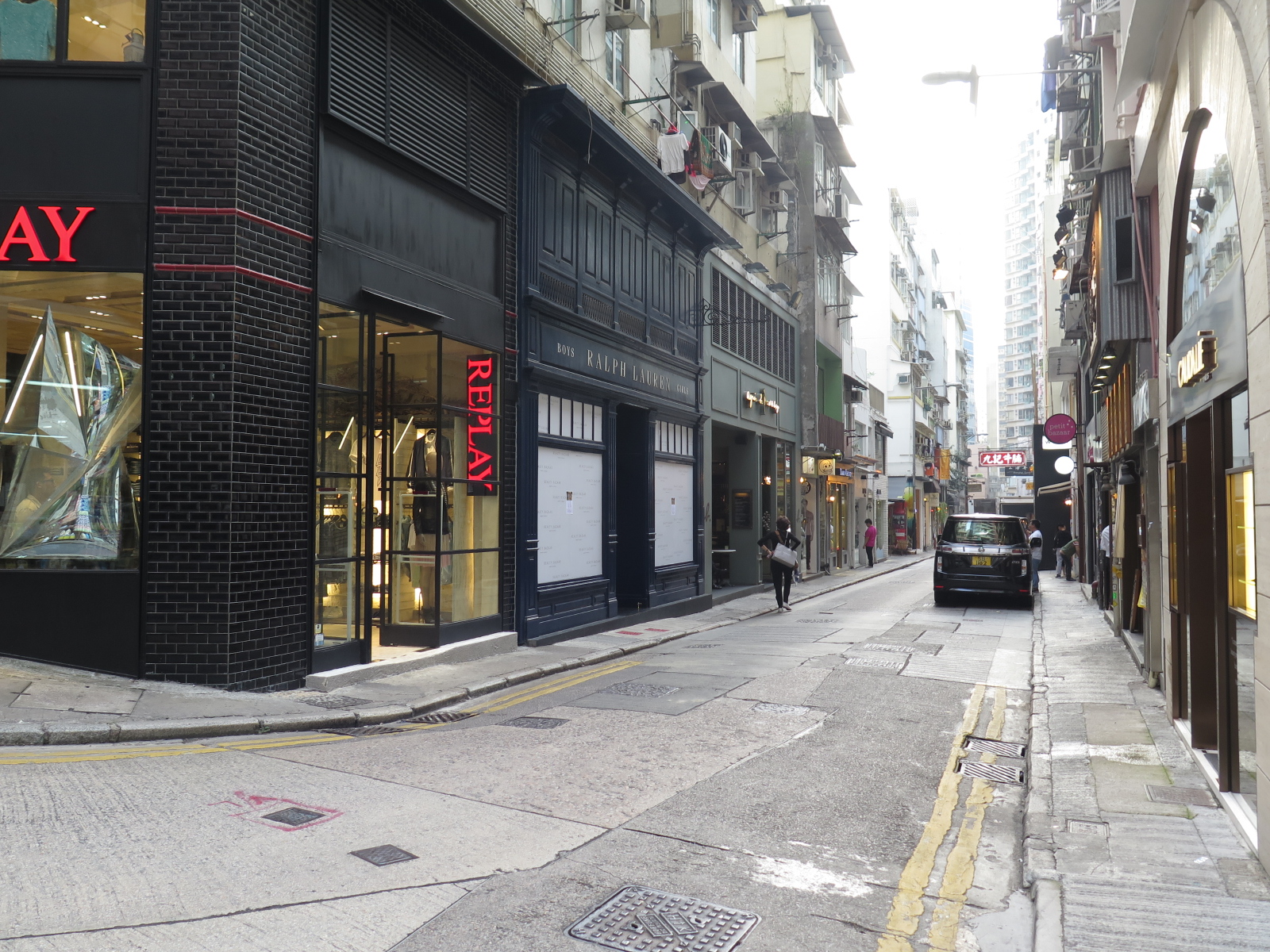
Gough Street, 2015

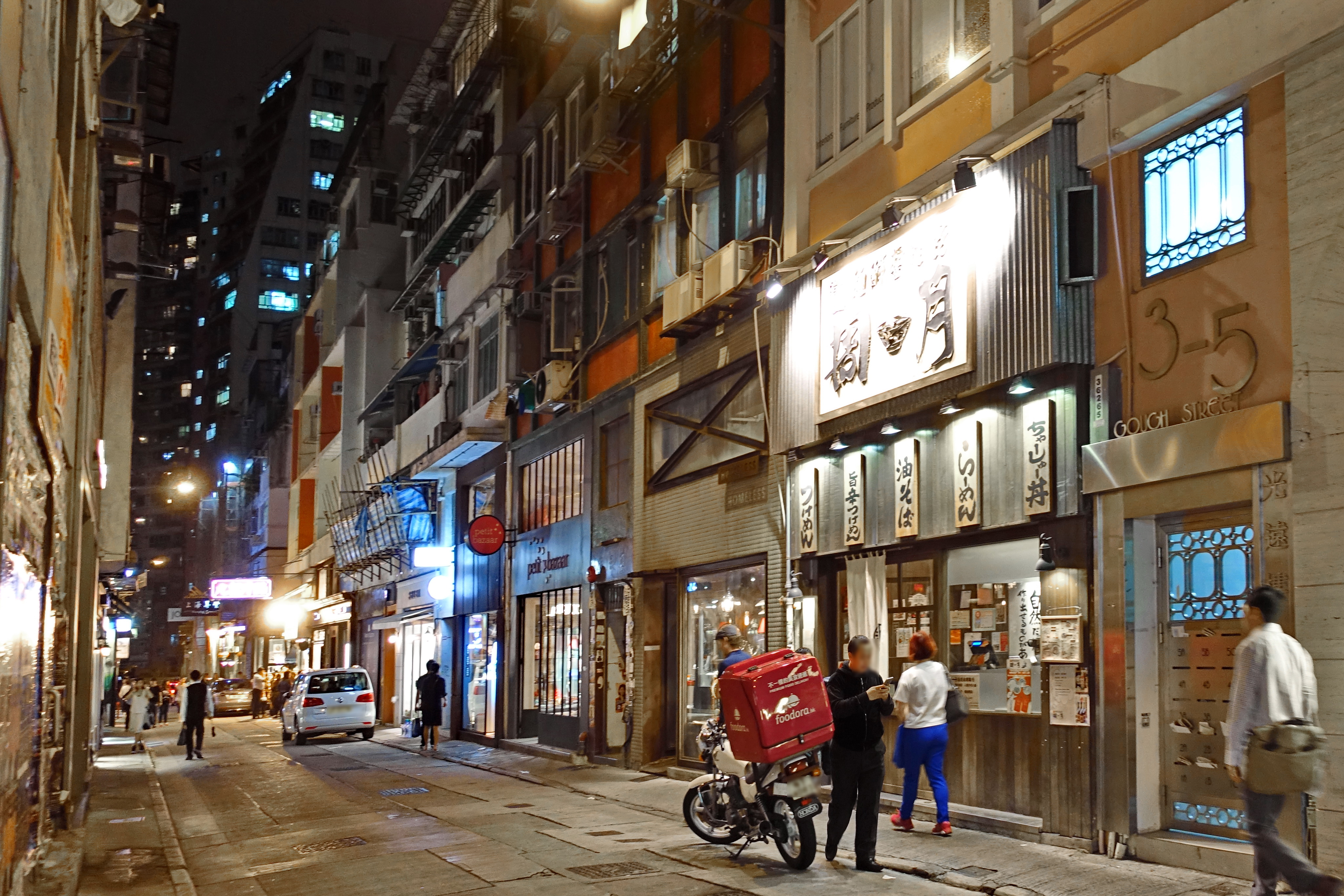
Gough Street

Gough Street (Chinese: 歌賦街) is a street on Sheung Wan, Hong Kong, just north of the Soho area of Central. It is connected to Shing Wong Street to the west and Aberdeen Street to the east. The street is informally referred to as "NoHo", north of Hollywood Road.

The street is named for Hugh Gough, 1st Viscount Gough, Commander-in-Chief of British Forces in China.

== History ==
Historically, many local printing presses and old beef-brisket noodle shops were located on Gough Street. Kau Kee Restaurant, is a notable noodle shop that specialises in beef brisket noodles in clear soup (清湯牛腩) located there. In the last several years, a lot of the printing presses moved to other areas and new restaurants and bars began to move into the premises vacated by the printing presses. Now, the street has many international fashion brands and high-end home furnishings.

The street is most well known for hosting 'Yeung Yiu Kee' (楊耀記), a family business of Yeung Hok-ling in 1884, where he gathered with friends and fellow revolutionaries Sun Yat-sen, Chan Siu-bak and Yau Lit, known collectively as the Four Bandits. As Sun Yat-sen became an important figure for his founding of the Republic of China, the street was honored as part of the Dr Sun Yat-sen Historical Trail.

== See also ==
- List of streets and roads in Hong Kong
