= The Church of Jesus Christ of Latter-day Saints in Hong Kong =

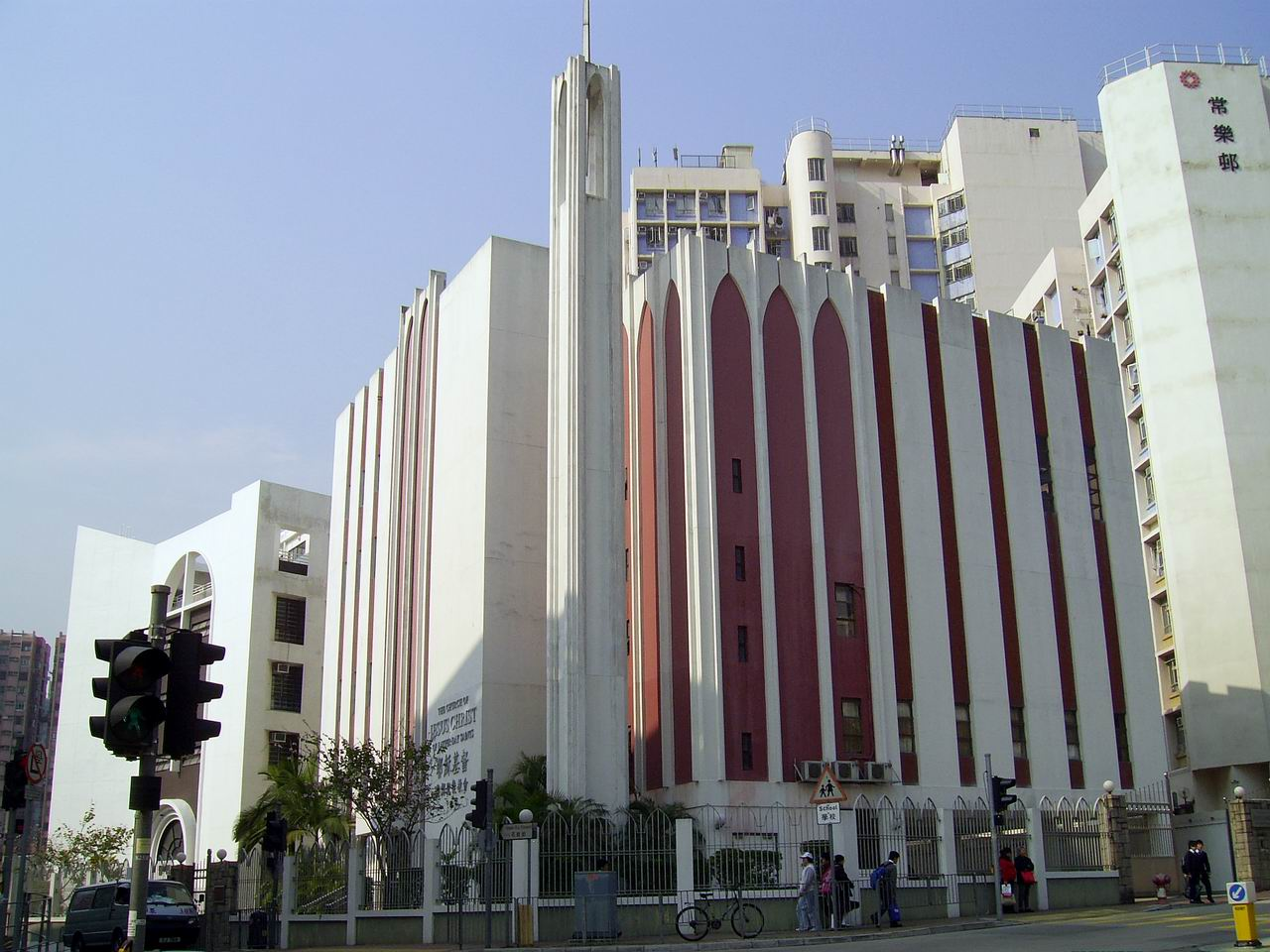
- A meetinghouse in Hong Kong.
- Area: Asia
- Members: 24,930 (2025)
- Stakes: 4
- Districts: 1
- Wards: 20
- Branches: 6
- Total Congregations: 26
- Missions: 1
- Temples: 1 operating
- FamilySearch Centers: 9

The Church of Jesus Christ of Latter-day Saints in Hong Kong refers to the Church of Jesus Christ of Latter-day Saints (LDS Church) and its members in Hong Kong. In 2025, Hong Kong had the third most LDS Church members per capita in Asia behind the Philippines and Mongolia.

== History ==
Membership in Hong Kong
Year	Members
1950	3
1960	346
1970	3,085
1980	6,193
1989*	17,000
1999	20,256
2009	23,223
2019	25,083
2025	24,930
*Membership was published as an estimated or rounded number. Source: Windall J. Ashton; Jim M. Wall, Deseret News, various years, Church Almanac Country Information: Hong Kong

The LDS Church has had a presence in Hong Kong since 1949 when church president George Albert Smith sent missionaries to China to preach.

== Stakes & district ==
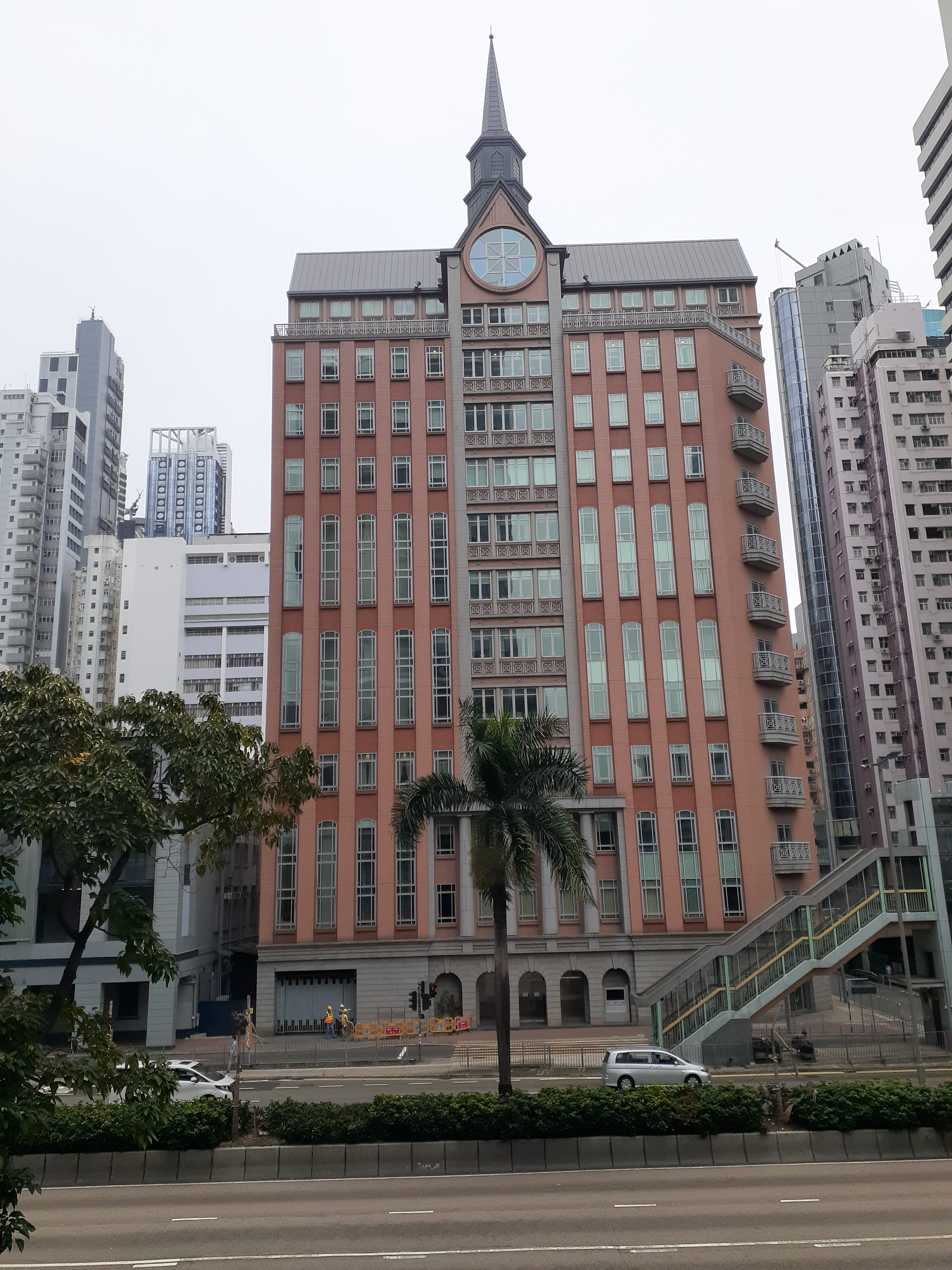
Wan Chai Chapel

As of August 2026, the LDS Church had 4 stakes and one district in Hong Kong:

Stake/District	Organized
Hong Kong China District (English/Mandarin)	17 May 1998
Hong Kong China Kowloon Stake	20 Mar 1994
Hong Kong China New Territories Stake	11 Nov 1984
Hong Kong China Tolo Harbour Stake	11 Nov 1984
Hong Kong China Victoria Harbour Stake	25 Apr 1976

== Missions ==
The China Hong Kong Mission is the only one in the region and its geographical administrative area includes all of China. There are missionaries in Macau but as of 2007, there are none preaching within mainland China, although there are some service missionaries.

== Temples ==
Hong Kong China Temple Location
Red = Operating
Blue = Under Construction
Yellow = Announced
Black = Closed for Renovations

The Hong Kong China Temple was built in 1996 and is located at 2 Cornwall Street, Kowloon Tong. When it was completed it served also as a meetinghouse for a local congregation. The offices of the China Hong Kong Mission were also located in the building, as were living quarters for the temple president, mission president, and others. In 2005, with the completion of a new administration building in Wan Chai, the headquarters for the church moved there. In June 2010, with the completion of a new chapel across the street (street address: 18 Dorset Crescent), the meetinghouse and mission offices were relocated there. The living quarters for the temple president, mission president, and six missionaries are still located in the temple building.

In January 2019, the LDS Church announced that the Hong Kong China Temple would close on July 8, 2019, for extensive renovations. The temple was reopened in June 2022.

48. Hong Kong China Temple; Official website; News & images	
Location: Announced: Groundbreaking: Dedicated: Rededicated: Size: Style:	Kowloon Tong, Hong Kong, China; 3 October 1992 by Ezra Taft Benson; 22 January 1994 by John K. Carmack; 26 May 1996 by Gordon B. Hinckley; 19 June 2022 by Gerrit W. Gong; 51,921 sq ft (4,823.6 m^{2}) on a 0.31-acre (0.13 ha) site Hong Kong colonial, single-spire design - designed by Liang Peddle Thorpe Architects

== See also ==
- Religion in Hong Kong
