= Four Bandits =

Group of student revolutionaries in Hong Kong, Qing China

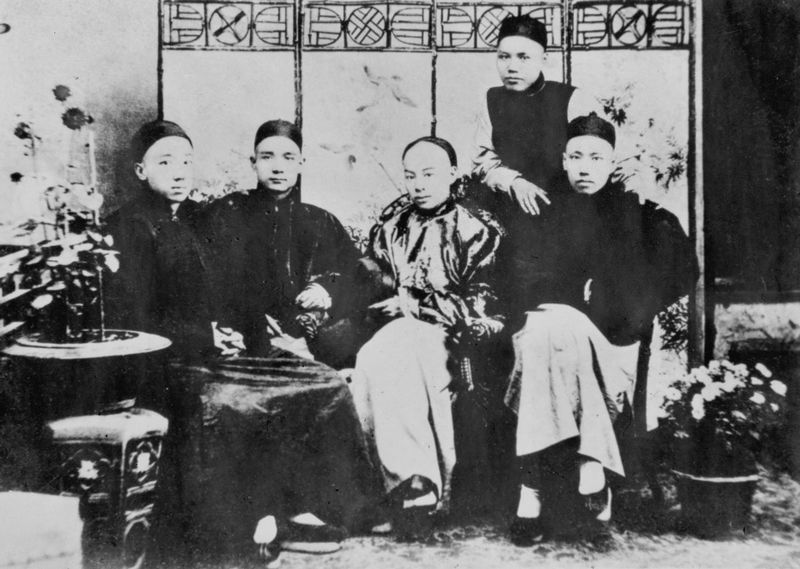
Photograph at the Hong Kong College of Medicine for Chinese (from left to right: Yeung Hok-ling, Sun Yat-sen, Chan Siu-bak and Yau Lit). The one standing was Kwan King-leung. Photo taken circa 1888.

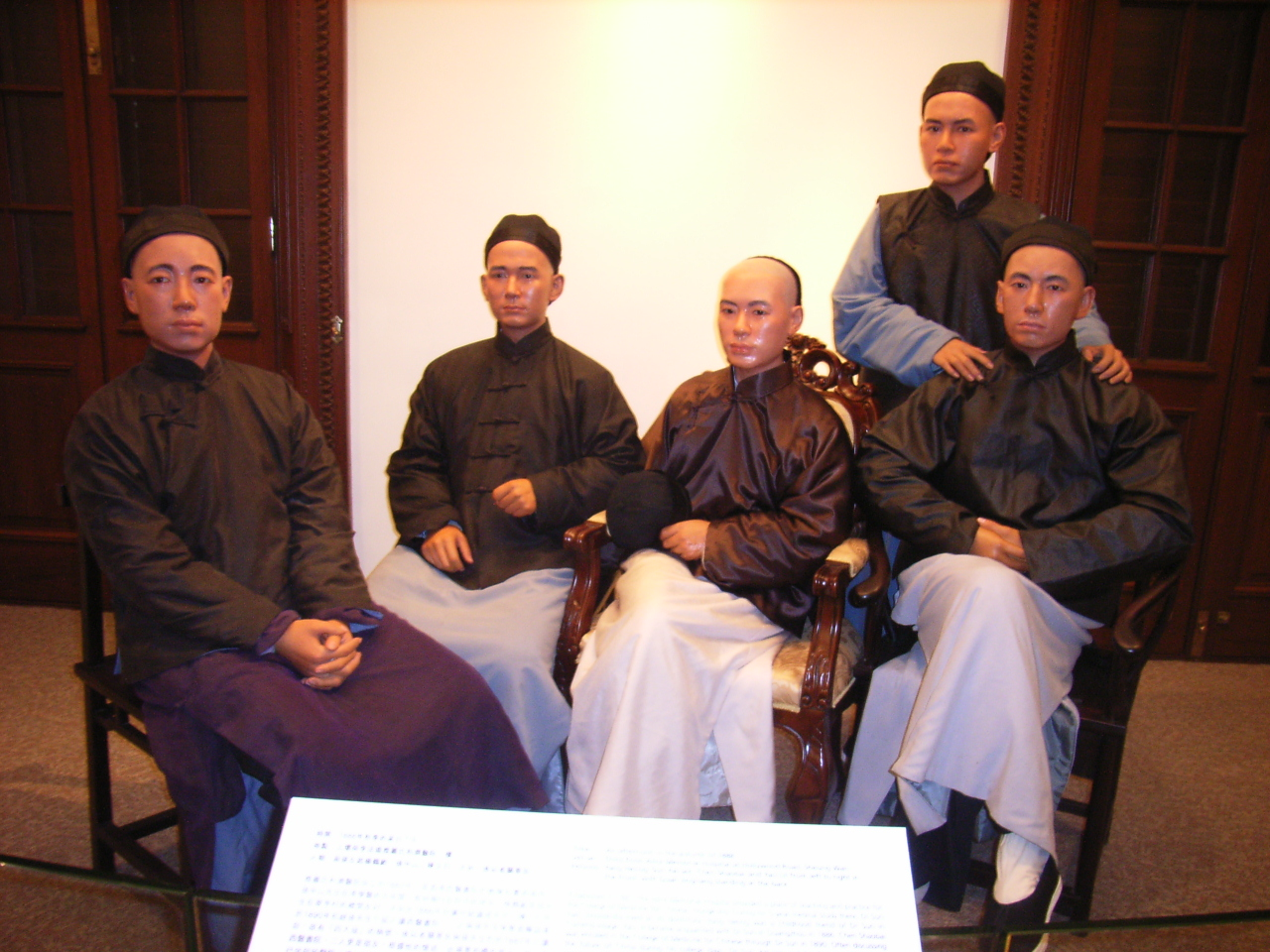
Wax statues of the Four Bandits at the Dr Sun Yat-sen Museum.

The Four Bandits, Four Outlaws or Four Desperados (Chinese: 四大寇) was a nickname given to a 19th-century group of four young revolutionaries: Sun Yat-sen, Yeung Hok-ling, Chan Siu-bak and Yau Lit. While studying in British Hong Kong, they were keen on Chinese politics and aspired to overthrow the Manchu-led Qing dynasty. The quad used to gather at 'Yeung Yiu Kee' (楊耀記), Yeung's family business located at 24 Gough Street in Hong Kong. One of the Four Bandits, Sun Yat-sen, later became the leader of China Revolutionary Alliance and the first Provisional President of the Republic of China. Today, the Dr Sun Yat-sen Museum displays their wax sculptures to commemorate the quad.
