= Yau Lit =

Chinese revolutionary (1864–1936)

- 尢列
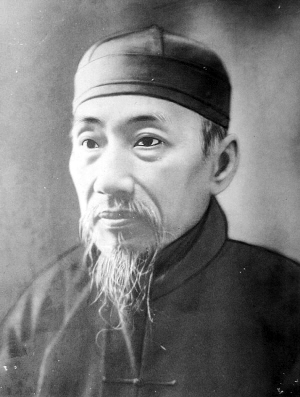
- Born: Yau Kwai-bok; 1864; Shunde, Guangdong, Qing dynasty
- Died: 12 December 1936 (aged 71–72); Nanjing, Republic of China
- Occupation: revolutionary
- Children: Yau Wing-cheong (son)
- Father: Yau Wan-wan

Chinese name
- Chinese: 尢列
- Jyutping: Jau^{4} Lit^{6}
Transcriptions
Standard Mandarin
- Hanyu Pinyin: Yóu Liè
- Bopomofo: ㄧㄡˊㄌㄧㄝˋ
- Wade–Giles: Yu^{2} Lieh^{4}
Yue: Cantonese
- Jyutping: Jau^{4} Lit^{6}

Birth name
- Chinese: 尢季博
- Jyutping: Jau^{4} Gwai^{3}-bok^{3}
Transcriptions
Standard Mandarin
- Hanyu Pinyin: Yóu Jìbó
- Bopomofo: ㄧㄡˊㄐㄧˋㄅㄛˊ
- Wade–Giles: Yu^{2} Chi^{4}-po^{2}
Yue: Cantonese
- Jyutping: Jau^{4} Gwai^{3}-bok^{3}

Courtesy name
- Chinese: 推孝
- Jyutping: Teoi^{1} Haau^{3}
Transcriptions
Standard Mandarin
- Hanyu Pinyin: Tuī Xiào
- Bopomofo: ㄊㄨㄟㄒㄧㄠˋ
- Wade–Giles: T'ui^{1} Hsiao^{4}
Yue: Cantonese
- Jyutping: Teoi^{1} Haau^{3}

School name
- Chinese: 其洞
- Jyutping: Kei^{4} Dung^{6}
Transcriptions
Standard Mandarin
- Hanyu Pinyin: Qí Dòng
- Bopomofo: ㄑㄧˊㄉㄨㄥˋ
- Wade–Giles: Ch'i^{2} Tung^{4}
Yue: Cantonese
- Jyutping: Kei^{4} Dung^{6}

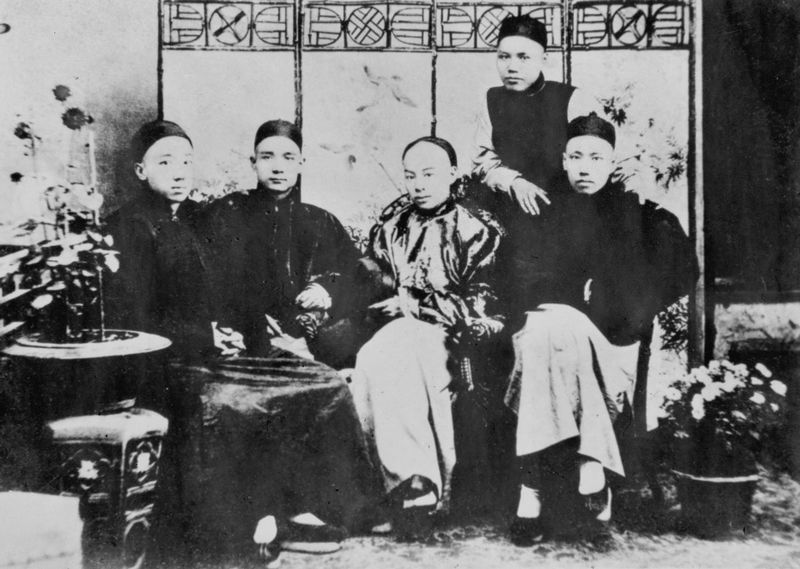
Yau Lit, sitting at the right, as one of the Four Bandits

Yau Lit (Chinese: 尢列; pinyin: Yóu Liè; Wade–Giles: Yu Lieh; 1864 – 12 December 1936), born Yau Kwai-bok (尢季博), courtesy name Tui-hau (推孝) or Ling-kwai (令季), or Euclid Yau, was a Chinese revolutionary from Shuntak, Guangdong. He is one of the Four Bandits, together with Sun Yat-sen, Chan Siu-bak and Yeung Hok-ling.

== Early life ==
Yau was born to a family of scholars at Xinjifang, Xingtan, Shunde District, Guangdong. He entered a private school at the age of 5, and was educated under Luk Nam-long (陸南朗), a famous scholar in his hometown, at the age of 10. Luk influenced Yau with his strong sense of distinction between the Manchus and the Han Chinese.

== Revolution ==
In 1881, the 17-year-old Yau Lit travelled to Shanghai, Incheon, the Three Northeast Provinces and Nanking, joined the Hongmen during the journey and aspired to revolution. When he returned to Guangdong, he entered the Canton Academy of Mathematics (廣州算學館). Later, he worked at the Mathematics Branch of Shatin Bureau, Guangdong, and was responsible for drawing the border between China and the then France-occupied Annam. In 1892, Yau worked as a secretary at the Secretariat for Chinese Affairs of Hong Kong.

One day, Yau visited Yeung Hok-ling, his classmate at the Canton Academy of Mathematics, and was introduced to Sun Yat-sen, a medical student from Yeung's hometown. Sun then introduced them to Chan Siu-bak, his classmate at the Alice Memorial Hospital. The four frequently met at Yeung Yiu Kee (楊耀記), Yeung's family shop at 24 Gough Street, to discuss a revolution against the Qing dynasty, and were collectively called the Four Bandits by their neighbours.

Yau was a member of the Furen Literary Society, which was set up to spread the idea of revolution. He introduced Yeung Kui-wan, the leader of Furen, to Sun, who had already established the Revive China Society in Honolulu, Hawaii. After the Furen Literary Society was merged into the Revive China Society to set up the Hong Kong Chapter of the Revive China Society, Yau participated in plotting the Canton Uprising of 1895. The uprising failed, and Lu Haodong was among the revolutionaries killed by Qing soldiers. Yau had to flee to Saigon.

In 1897, Yau returned to Hong Kong to found the Chung-wo Tong (中和堂) in Kowloon to advocate revolution; branches were later founded in Yokohama, Japan and Southeast Asia. Chung-wo Tong was subsequently merged into the Tongmenghui. In 1900 Yau participated in another unsuccessful uprising in Waichow, and had to flee to Yokohama with Sun. In Yokohama Yau and Sun decided the government after revolution should be called the Republic of China (中華民國).

Yau focused on gaining the support from Chinese people living in Nanyang. He worked as the chief editor of the Thoe Lam Jit Poh (圖南日報), a pro-revolution newspaper circulating in Southeast Asia. He was jailed for several months in Singapore when he came to assist other revolutionaries.

Following the Wuchang Uprising in 1911, Yau went to Yunnan to persuade his old friend Cai E to join the Xinhai Revolution.

== After the revolution ==
In 1912, the Republic of China was established in Nanjing as the first democratic republic in East Asia. Soon afterwards, Zhang Xun, a general who remained loyal to Qing, attacked Nanking. Fearing Nanking would be captured, Yau Lit initiated the Chung-wo North Expedition Army (中和北伐軍) to protect the capital city. Emperor Puyi of Qing abdicated after the failure of Zhang's attack.

Yau was invited to Beijing by President Yuan Shikai to discuss national issues, but escaped to Tianjin when he discovered Yuan was only using him to restrain Sun Yat-sen. When Yuan declared himself the Emperor of China, Guan Renfu (關仁甫) of Chung-wo Tong was one of the National Protection Armies against Yuan. Yuan died and the Republic of China was restored.

When Sun Yat-sen established the Government in Canton in 1921, the Three Bandits were appointed as Sun's consultants. Seeing himself at odds with Chan Siu-bak and his suggestions opposed by Hu Hanmin, Yau returned to Hong Kong to set up a school teaching Confucian values. He also co-founded the Hong Kong Chinese Herbalist Association to promote traditional Chinese medicine.

== Later life ==
In 1936, when China had been reunified by Chiang Kai-shek, Yau visited Nanjing and died there at the age of 72.

== Descendants ==
His descendants modified the "尢" surname to "尤", which shares the same pronunciation "Yau" as the former. Carrie Yau Tsang Ka-lai (尤曾嘉麗), former Permanent Secretary for Home Affairs of Hong Kong, is Yau Lit's great-granddaughter-in-law.
