= Chan Siu-bak =

Chinese revolutionary (1859–1934)

- 陳少白
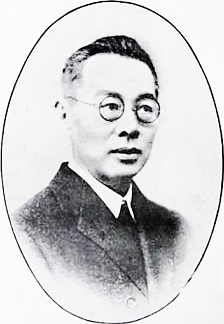

Personal details
- Born: Chan Siu-man; 20 July 1869 Xinhui District, Jiangmen, Guangdong, Qing dynasty
- Died: 23 December 1934 (aged 65) Beiping, Republic of China
- Resting place: Cha'an Temple, Xinhui District, Jiangmen, Guangdong, Republic of China
- Education: Canton Christian College; Hong Kong College of Medicine for Chinese
- Occupation: revolutionary, politician

Chinese name
- Traditional Chinese: 陳少白
- Simplified Chinese: 陈少白
Transcriptions
Standard Mandarin
- Hanyu Pinyin: Chén Shàobái
Yue: Cantonese
- Jyutping: Can^{4} Siu^{3}baak^{6}
other Yue
- Taishanese: Cin^{3} Siau^{1}bak^{5}

Birth name
- Traditional Chinese: 陳紹聞
- Simplified Chinese: 陈绍闻
Transcriptions
Standard Mandarin
- Hanyu Pinyin: Chén Shàowén
Yue: Cantonese
- Jyutping: Can^{4} Siu^{6}man^{4}
other Yue
- Taishanese: Cin^{3} Siau^{5}mun^{3}

Art name
- Traditional Chinese: 夔石
- Simplified Chinese: 夔石
Transcriptions
Standard Mandarin
- Hanyu Pinyin: Kuí Shí
Yue: Cantonese
- Jyutping: Kwai^{4} Sek^{6}
other Yue
- Taishanese: Kai^{3} Siak^{4}

Chan Siu-bak (陳少白) (born Chan Siu-man (陳紹聞); 20 July 1869 – 23 December 1934), courtesy name Siu-bak (少白), art-named Kwai-shek (夔石), was a Chinese revolutionary from Xinhui, Guangdong. He was one of the Four Bandits, together with Sun Yat-sen, Yau Lit and Yeung Hok-ling.

== Early life ==
Chan was born to a family of Christian scholars, and entered a private school at the age of 6. When he was young, he learned about western knowledge from the translated books brought by his uncle Chan Mung-nam (陳夢南), a Christian preacher.

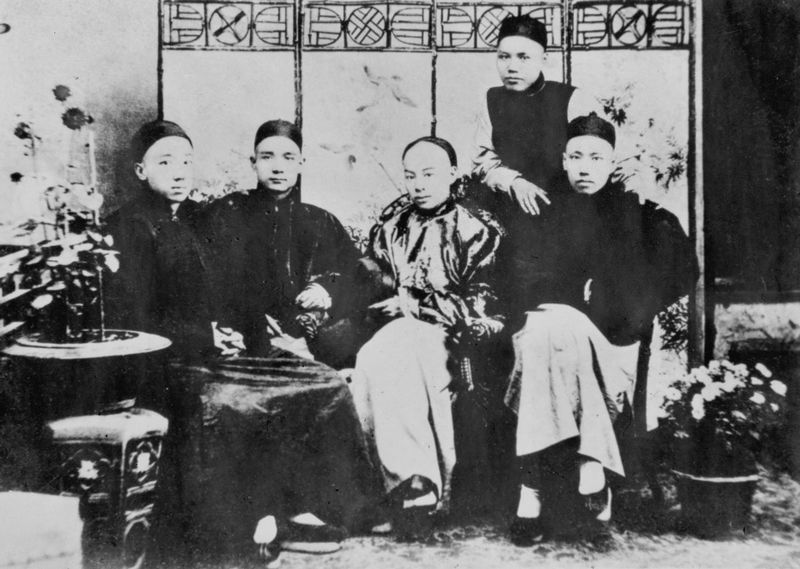
Photograph at the Hong Kong College of Medicine for Chinese (from left to right: Yeung Hok-ling, Sun Yat-sen, Chan Siu-bak and Yau Lit). The one standing was Kwan King-leung.

In 1888, Chan became one of the first students to study at Christian College in China (格致書院) founded by Andrew P. Happer. He met Au Fung-Chi (區鳳墀), who introduced him to Sun Yat-sen in 1889, a medical student at Hong Kong College of Medicine for Chinese. Chan and Sun found revolution as a common interest between themselves.

== Revolution ==
With Sun's suggestion, Chan changed to study at Hong Kong College of Medicine for Chinese in January 1890. In Hong Kong, Sun introduced him to Yau Lit and Yeung Hok-ling. The four frequently met at Yeung Yiu Kee (楊耀記), Yeung's family shop at 24 Gough Street, to discuss a revolution against the Qing Dynasty, and were collectively called the Four Bandits by their neighbours. As Sun began his commitment to revolution upon graduation, Chan dropped out of the medical school to follow him.

In 1895, the Revive China Society in Hong Kong was founded by Sun, and Chan became a member of the society. Chan and Sun set up the headquarters of the society at 13 Staunton Street, Central, Hong Kong. Following the failure of the Canton Uprising of 1895, Chan fled to Yokohama, Japan with Sun and Cheng Si-leung. He would stay there for 2 years until he went to Taiwan to set up the Taiwan Chapter of Revive China Society.

In 1899, he returned to Hong Kong to reform the Chung-wo Tong (中和堂) founded by Yau Lit earlier. In 1900, he founded the China Daily to spread the idea of revolution. In 1905 he became the president of the Hong Kong Chinese Revolutionary Alliance. Upon the recommendation of Chan Siu-bak, Chan Po-yin joined in Hong Kong the Chinese Revolutionary Alliance in 1905 and went to Singapore in 1906 to help Mr. Chan Cho-nam (陳楚楠, 1884–1971) and Mr. Cheung Wing-fook (張永福, 1872-?) in starting the revolution-related Chong Shing Chinese Daily Newspaper (中興日報, 中興 meaning China revival), with the inaugural issue on 20 August 1907 and a daily distribution of 1000 copies. The newspaper ended in 1910, presumably due to the revolution in 1911. Working with other Cantonese people, the Singapore group opened the revolution-related Kai Ming Bookstore (開明書報社, 開明 meaning open wisdom) in Singapore. For the revolution, Chan Po-yin raised over 30,000 yuan for the purchase and shipment (from Singapore to China) of military equipment and for the support of the expenses of people travelling from Singapore to China for revolutionary work.

As Guangdong declared independence from Qing government shortly after the Wuchang Uprising in October 1911, Chan was appointed by the Guangdong military government as the foreign minister, until the Republic of China was established in Nanjing on 1 January 1912.

== After the revolution ==
After resigning from the government, Chan founded the Yuethong Shipping Company (粵航公司) and regained several piers in Canton from foreign companies. Yuethong lasted until 1919.

When Sun Yat-sen established the Government in Canton in 1921, the Three Bandits were appointed as Sun's consultants and Chan also as the advisor at the base camp. In 1923 the Canton Government was forced to dissolve due to Chen Jiongming's rebellion, and Chan returned to develop Xinhui.

== Death ==
In 1934, Chan was hospitalized due to illness. His condition deteriorated and was transferred to a German hospital in Beiping. The treatment failed and he died on 23 December 1934. His casket was escorted by the Nationalist representatives via the sea to Guangdong and was buried on the mountainside of Cha'an Temple in his hometown.
