= Yeung Hok-ling =

Chinese revolutionary (1868–1934)

- 楊鶴齡
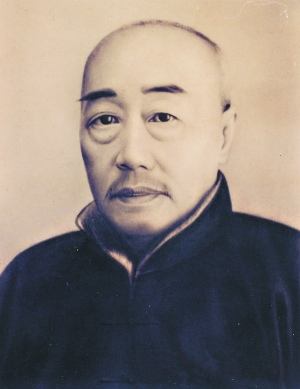
- Born: 1868; Portuguese Macau
- Died: 29 August 1934 (aged 65–66); Portuguese Macau
- Resting place: Cuiheng, Zhongshan, Guangdong, Republic of China
- Education: Canton Academy of Mathematics
- Occupation: revolutionary

Yeung Hok-ling (楊鶴齡) (1868 - 29 August 1934), courtesy name Lai-ha (禮遐), was a Chinese revolutionary. He is one of the Four Bandits, together with Sun Yat-sen, Yau Lit and Chan Siu-bak.

== Biography ==
Born in Macau, Yeung's hometown was at Cuiheng Village at Zhongshan in Guangdong, which was also the hometown of Sun Yat-sen and Lu Haodong. Yeung entered the Canton Academy of Mathematics (廣州算學館) in 1886. In 1888, he went to Hong Kong and stayed at Yeung Yiu Kee (楊耀記), his family shop on Gough Street, Sheung Wan.

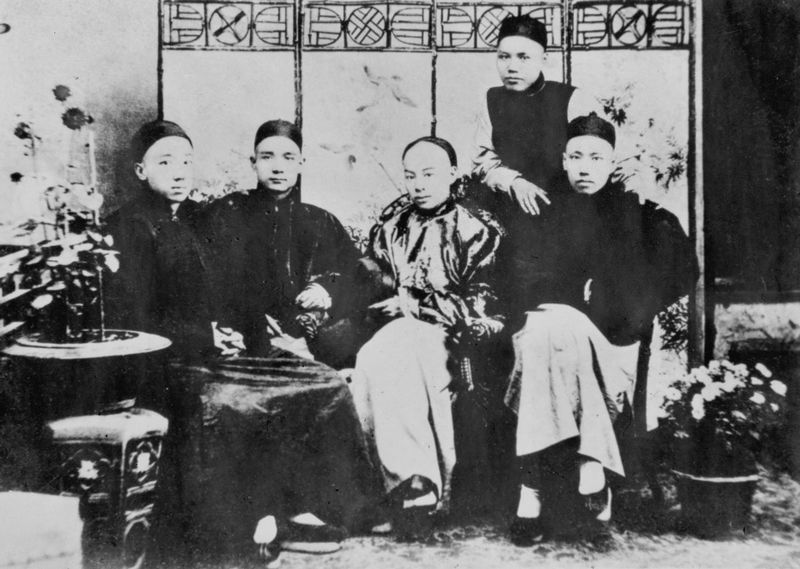
Yeung Hok-ling, sitting at the left, as one of the Four Bandits

In 1890, Yeung introduced Yau Lit, his classmate at the Canton Academy of Mathematics, to Sun Yat-sen, his old friend from Cuiheng. Sun then introduced them to Chan Siu-bak, his classmate at the Hong Kong College of Medicine for Chinese. The four frequently met at Yeung Yiu Kee to discuss a revolution against the Qing Dynasty, and were collectively called the Four Bandits by their neighbours.

When Sun graduated in 1892, he had to borrow money from Hospital Kiang Wu to set up his own pharmacy in Macau, and Yeung persuaded his brother-in-law, Ng Tsit-mei (吳節薇), to be Sun's guarantor. Sun was soon forced to leave Macao to redevelop his medical career in Shekkei, Heungshan, and Yeung sold a building in Rua Central to support him. In 1896, Yeung's father died and left him some properties in Heungshan, Hong Kong and Macau; he would later sell all these properties to finance anti-Qing revolution.

Later, Yeung worked at the China Daily founded by Chan Siu-bak to advocate revolution. After the Xinhai Revolution in 1911, he lived in Macau as a commoner. He wrote to Sun in 1919 to apply for a job in the Republic of China Government. When Sun Yat-sen established the Government in Canton in 1921, the Three Bandits were appointed as Sun's consultants, but Yeung resigned and returned to Macao after several months. In 1923 Sun re-established the Canton Government and appointed Yeung as the special investigator in Hong Kong and Macau. After Sun's death in 1925, Yeung returned to Macau.

Yeung died in Macau on 29 August 1934 and was buried at Cuiheng Village, Zhongshan, Guangdong.
