= Li Ki-tong =

Li Ki-tong (1873 – 6 October 1943; Chinese: 李紀堂; Sidney Lau: Lei^{5} Gei^{2} Tong^{4}) (formerly Li Po-lun) was a Hong Kong publisher and key financial backer of the revolutionary movement leading to the Xinhai Revolution which overthrew the Qing dynasty of China.

== Early life ==
Li was born in Xinhui, Guangdong, the third son of wealthy businessman Lei Sing (Chinese: 李陞; Sidney Lau: Lei^{5} Sing^{1}) (1830–1900).

== Publishing and wealth ==
Li's father was considered among Hong Kong's wealthiest Chinese, with vast landholdings. Consequently, Li became a substantial landholder, particularly in the New Territories, holding hundreds of acres in Castle Peak, Ha Pak Nai and Long Valley.

Li was the primary financier for the China Daily, founded to promote the revolution, published in Hong Kong from 1900 to 1911.

He spent his entire fortune in support of the revolution and ultimately spent time in debtors' prison and was bankrupted.

== Revolutionary ==
Li first met Dr Sun Yat-sen, as the latter passed through Hong Kong in June 1895, upon the introduction of revolutionary Yeung Ku-wan, co-founder of the forerunner to the Revive China Society, the Furen Literary Society. He was an early member of the China Club, established by revolutionary firebrand Tse Tsan-tai in 1898, and in 1900 became a member of the Revive China Society. He later also became a member of Dr Sun's Tongmenghui (Chinese Revolutionary Alliance).

Li owned the Red House on Castle Peak Farm and gave it over to the revolutionaries (including Feng Ziyou and Huang Xing) for military training and storage of materiel. He also operated a grocery store in the Central Market, whose proceeds went to support the revolution.

In January 1903, Li provided the financial resources for Tse Tsan-tai's failed uprising (the Heavenly Kingdom of the Great Mingshun) in Guangzhou. From 1904 to 1906, he operated a school in Kowloon to promote revolutionary ideas and as a source of recruitment.

In about 1910, Li provided land and resources for the erection of the fortified structure at No. 55 Ha Pak Nai, Yuen Long, Hong Kong, for use by the members of the Revive China Society.

Li died in 1943 in Chongqing, Sichuan, China, the wartime capital of the Republic of China.
