= Pak Tsz Lane Park =

Park in Hong Kong

Coordinates: 22°17′0.24″N 114°09′10.44″E

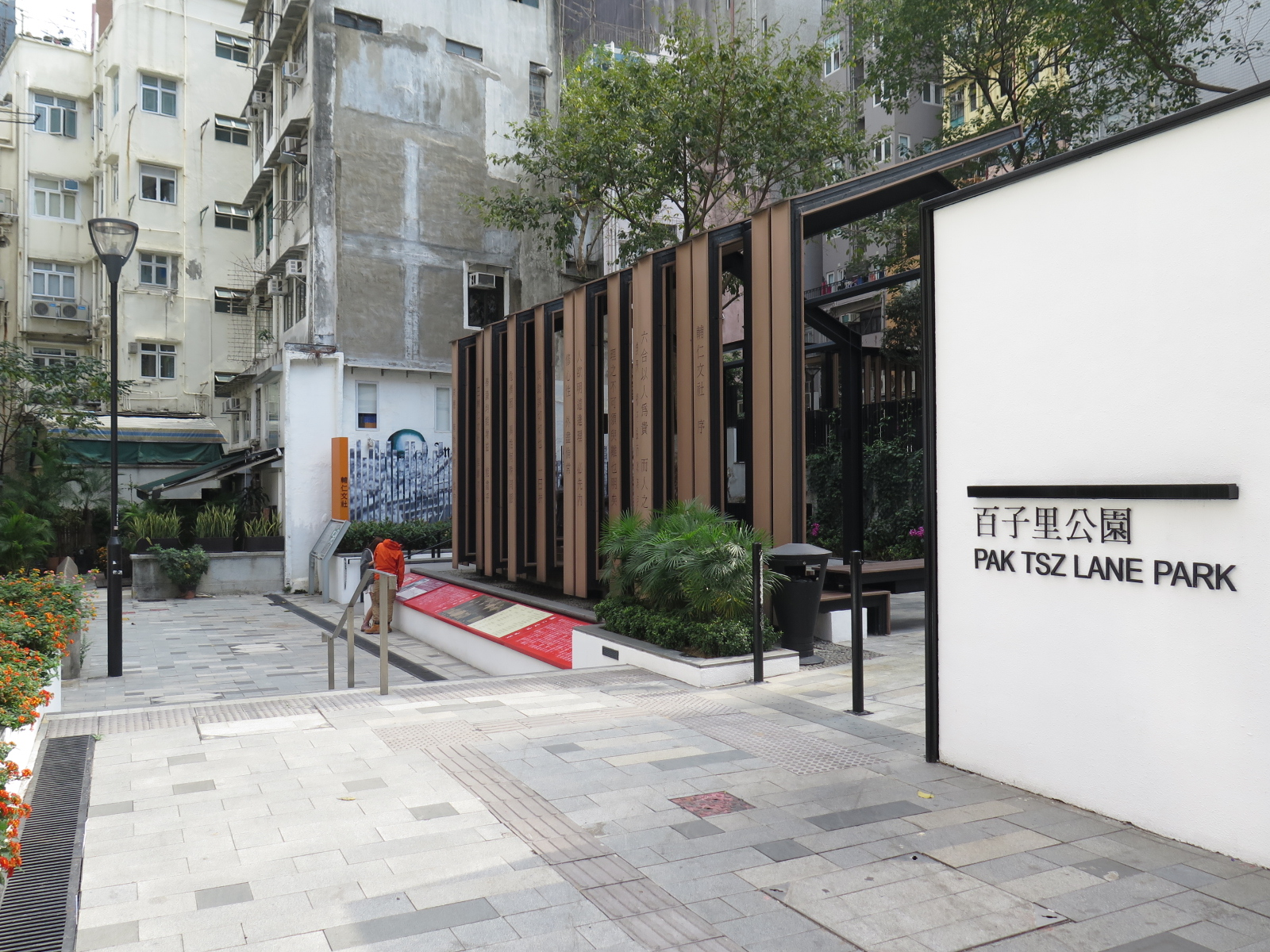
A general view of the display-panel area of Pak Tsz Lane Park (Hong Kong)

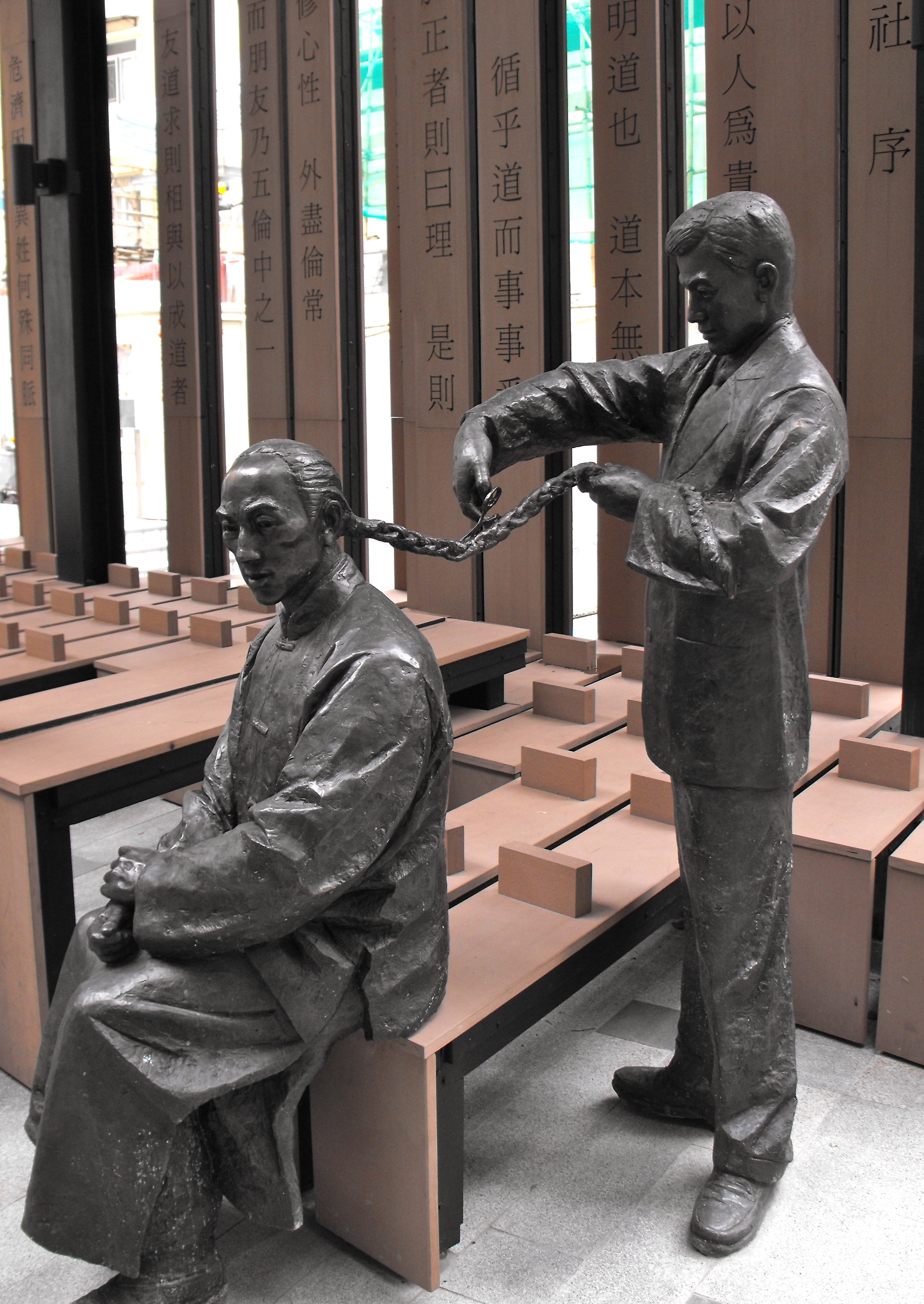
Sculpture "Cutting off the Queue (pigtail)"

Pak Tsz Lane Park (Chinese: 百子里公園) is a park in Central, Hong Kong, featuring a monument celebrating the late 19th-century revolutionary anti-Qing Dynasty activity of the members of the Furen Literary Society and the Hong Kong chapter of the Revive China Society. Leading members of these societies were Yeung Ku-wan (President), Sun Yat-sen and Tse Tsan-tai.

The park is located in central Hong Kong, in a quiet square behind Aberdeen Street, Hollywood Road, Gage Street and Peel Street. It is close to the rear of 52 Gage Street where the revolutionists met and where Yeung Ku-wan taught and was eventually assassinated by Qing Dynasty agents. The Park can be approached by a number of narrow lanes, such as Sam Ka Lane (三家里), and Pak Tsz Lane (百子里), all of which afforded a number of possibilities for a quick get-away by the revolutionists, in case of action against them by either Qing agents or the Hong Kong police.

The park was refurbished by the architecture firm Ronald Lu & Partners, who were also responsible for the design. The work was directed and financed ($HK 40 million) by the Hong Kong Urban Renewal Authority. It was opened in May 2012, in time for the Xinhai Revolution Centenary anniversary in October 2011.

It now comprises:

- Information panels recounting the founding and history of the Furen Literary Society and details of the founding members.
- An audio-visual commentary
- A bronze sculpture of a Western-dressed man cutting the queue (pigtail) of a Chinese man dressed in traditional Manchu clothes, as a symbol of liberation from the Qing rule
- In the pavement nearby are inscribed the tenets of the Furen Literary Society (in English)
- Slatted panels displaying maps of Guangzhou and Huizhou indicating events during the rebellions organised in 1895 and 1900, respectively.
- A slatted display of Sun Yat-sen's letter of condolence to Tse Tsan-tai, following the assassination of Yeung Kui-wan.
- An educative game [based on a children's street game] with time-lines of the actions of the Furen Literary Society leading to 3 discs fixed to a wall. Each disc has paired windows which, when the discs are turned, show paired photographs illustrating important events and actions by the early revolutionists.

Also the remains can be seen of an old well, which, though unrelated to the history of the Furen Literary Society, has been preserved.

Pak Tsz Lane is Stop 8 and the rear of 52 Gage Street is Stop 7 on the Dr Sun Yat-sen Historical Trail. The latter stop is in one of the approach lanes to the Pak Tsz Lane Park.

None of the explanations is in English. The lack of signposts, in adjacent streets, pointing to the park means that it can be easy to miss the park.
