= Timeline of late anti-Qing rebellions =

Numerous rebellions against China's Qing dynasty took place between the mid-19th and early 20th centuries, prior to the abdication of the last Emperor of China, Puyi, in February 1912. The table below lists some of these uprisings and important related events.

== Taiping Rebellion ==
Date	War	Pro-Chinese parties	Rebels	Death	Length
December 1850 (Note: Some sources claims it started in January 1851.) – July 1864 (Note: According to Tucker the fall of Nanking is usually described as the end of the war. However the last rebels led by Li Fuzhong were in August 1871 defeated.)	Taiping Rebellion (Note: Also known as the Taiping Civil War or the Taiping Revolution.)	Qing China; British Empire; France	Taiping Heavenly Kingdom; Co-belligerents: Nian rebels Red Turban rebels Small Swords Society	10–30 million killed	13 years and 6 months (minimum); 20 years and 8 months (maximum)

== Nian Rebellion ==
Date	War	Pro-Chinese parties	Rebels	Death	Length
1851 (Note: Encyclopædia Britannica claims it started in 1853.) – 1868	Nian Rebellion (Note: Also written as the Nien Rebellion.)	Qing China	Nian rebels (Note: This includes the Five Banner alliance, the Army of the Taipings and some Henan armies); Co-belligerents: Taiping Heavenly Kingdom; Red Turban rebels	100,000+ killed	15 years (minimum); 17 years (maximum)

== Miao Rebellion ==
Date	War	Pro-Chinese parties	Rebels	Death	Length
1854 – 1873	Miao Rebellion (Note: Also known as the Qian Rebellion.)	Qing China	Miao people	4.9 million+ killed	19 years

== Red Turban Rebellion ==
Date	War	Pro-Chinese parties	Rebels	Death	Length
1854 – 1856	Red Turban Rebellion (Note: Also known as the Red Turban Revolt and the Taiping Rebellion in Guangdong.)	Qing China	Red Turban rebels	Unknown	2 years

== Da Cheng Rebellion ==
Date	War	Pro-Chinese parties	Rebels	Death	Length
1855 – 1861	Da Cheng Rebellion (Note: Also known as the Hong Soldiers Rebellion.)	Qing China	Hong Soldiers rebels	Unknown	6 years

== Panthay Rebellion ==
Date	War	Pro-Chinese parties	Rebels	Death	Length
1856 – 1873	Panthay Rebellion (Note: Also known as the Du Wenxiu Rebellion and the Tu Wen-hsiu Rebellion.)	Qing China	pro-Du Wenxiu forces	Unknown	17 years

== First Dungan Revolt ==
Date	War	Pro-Chinese parties	Rebels	Death	Length
1862 – 1877	First Dungan Revolt (Note: Also known as the Tongzhi Hui Revolt and the Hui (Muslim) Minorities War.)	Qing China	Kashgar's rebels	Unknown	15 years

== Summary ==
Date	Event
1850–1864	The Taiping Rebellion, led by the heterodox Christian convert Hong Xiuquan, sees southern China descend into civil war. The rebellion later becomes an inspiration to Sun Yat-sen, the leader of the 1911 Revolution.
1851–1868	The Nian Rebellion, revolt in Northern China
1861–1895	The Self-Strengthening Movement seeks institutional reform – members of China's elite seek to modernise the nation.
1890s	More intellectuals and members of the elite, mostly students studying abroad, vow to overthrow the Manchu Qing Dynasty and build a republic.
1892	Yeung Ku-wan, together with Tse Tsan-tai and others, start the Furen Literary Society in Hong Kong.
1894	Sun Yat-sen founds the Revive China Society (Xingzhonghui) in Honolulu, Hawaii.
1895	China is defeated in the First Sino-Japanese War, revealing the severe weaknesses of the Qing state, and the power of the modernised Japanese Empire.
1895	The Furen Literary Society is merged into the Hong Kong chapter of the Revive China Society, with Yeung Ku-wan as president and Sun Yat-sen as Secretary.
1895	The Gongche Shangshu movement – a petition of civil service candidates – becomes the first modern Chinese political movement, with intellectuals and members of the elite petitioning the Qing government for political reform. The leaders of the movement become the key figures of the Hundred Days' Reform.
1895	The abortive First Guangzhou uprising is organised by the Hong Kong chapter of the Revive China Society. Sun Yat-sen and Yeung Ku-wan are forced to leave China and Hong Kong, respectively.
1898	The Hundred Days' Reform sees the young Guangxu Emperor initiate 103 days of reform, which are ended by conservative opponents led by Empress Dowager Cixi. Many reformers are forced to leave the country.
1898	The Boxer Rebellion highlights hostility to foreigners and domestic political frustration. The movement targets foreign concessions and missionaries in China.
Early 1900s	The Revive China Society and other revolutionary groups stage abortive coups across the country, including the Huizhou uprising in 1900, the Ping-liu-li uprising in 1906, and the Huanggang uprising in 1907. Japan becomes the most popular destination for Chinese students, as revolutionary sentiments spread.
1901	Yeung Kui-wan is assassinated and buried in an unnamed tomb in Hong Kong.
1905	Sun Yat-sen and Song Jiaoren found the Tongmenghui, an alliance of many Chinese revolutionary groups, in Tokyo. Its oath is "To expel Tartar barbarians and to revive China, to establish a republic, and to distribute land equally among the people".
1911	The Railway Protection Movement begins in response to public anger over the sale, by the Qing government, of railway construction rights to foreigners. Violence spreads to Sichuan, Shaanxi and Hunan. The Qing government mobilises troops to put down unrest in Hubei.
April 27, 1911	Second Guangzhou Uprising or the Yellow Flower Mound revolt, is led by Huang Xing, the Tong Meng Hui leader. Over a hundred revolutionaries force their way into the residence of the viceroy of Guangdong and Guangxi provinces. The revolt ends in a catastrophic defeat, and most of the revolutionaries are killed.
October 10, 1911	Revolutionary groups organise the Wuchang Uprising in the Hubei city of Wuchang. This serves as the catalyst for the Xinhai Revolution and the establishment of the Republic of China.
January 1, 1912	Sun Yat-sen announces the establishment of the Republic of China in Nanking, and is inaugurated as the provisional president of the republic.
February 12, 1912	The last Qing emperor, Puyi, abdicates.
February 14, 1912	Yuan Shikai is elected provisional president of the Republic of China by the provisional Nanjing senate and on March 10, in Peking (Beijing), is sworn in.

== See also ==
- Anti-Qing sentiment
- Wuchang Uprising
- 1911 Revolution

== Bibliography ==
- Tucker, Spencer C. (2017). The Roots and Consequences of Civil Wars and Revolutions: Conflicts that Changed World History. Santa Barbara, California: ABC-CLIO. ISBN 978-1-44-084-2948.
- Sunday Morning Post (hard copy). Hong Kong. 9 October 2011.
