= Heavenly Kingdom of the Great Mingshun =

Short-lived revolutionary state within Qing China (1903)

Heavenly Kingdom of the Great Mingshun 大明順天國
- 1903–1903
- Status: Unrecognized state
- Capital: Guangzhou
- Common languages: Chinese, Cantonese
- Religion: God Worshipping Society; Tiandihui
- Government: Monarchist revolutionary state
- Leaders
  - 1903: Tse Tsan-tai, Li Ki-tong and Hong Quanfu
- Historical era: Qing dynasty
  - Established: January 28, 1903
  - Disestablished: January 31, 1903
Preceded by	Succeeded by
Qing dynasty	Qing dynasty
- Today part of: China

The Heavenly Kingdom of the Great Mingshun (Chinese: 大明順天國), or the Shuntian Kingdom (順天國), was an attempt within Qing China by members of the Revive China Society to establish a Westernized constitutional monarchy with references to the Taiping Heavenly Kingdom in 1903, founders of whom were Tse Tsan-tai, Li Ki-tong, and Hong Quanfu, a former Taiping general.

== Description ==
The name of the Heavenly Kingdom connotes major anti-Manchu ideals and also bears reference to the former Taiping Heavenly Kingdom, the ripples of whose rebellion were still felt at the turn of the century. The daming 大明 means the revival of the Ming dynasty (a sentiment shared by many Chinese secret societies at the time), shuntian 順天 refers to the proverb 順天應時 (to follow the mandate of heaven and comply with the popular wishes of the people), and tianguo 天國 is a nod to the Taiping; a kingdom of God among mortals. Even though much of the Shuntian Kingdom draws inspiration from the Taiping, unlike the dictatorship-esque government Hong Xiuquan established, the Shuntian Kingdom advocated for a constitutional monarchy and a democratic republic, like the United Kingdom and the United States respectively. It advocated to return the government to the people through elections and emphasized all men were created equal, all the while retaining the core of Chinese culture and tradition.

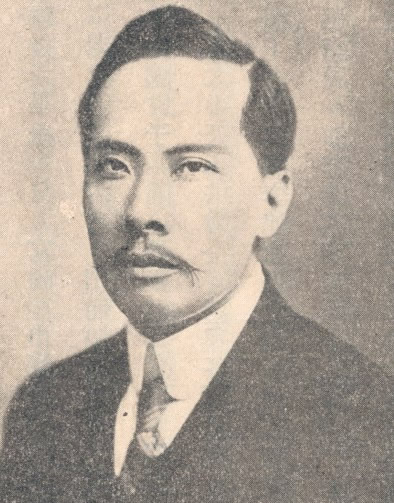
Tse Tsan-tai

Hong Quanfu

Zuantai and Quanfu, two important people to the cause of the Heavenly Kingdom

Almost all organizers of the Heavenly Kingdom were Christians and had ties to the Chinese triads. As they were baptized by Western missionaries and had extensive contact with Western ideals, they strove to reform China with Western-style education. For example, Yung Wing, the interim president, received a Western, Christian education in the United States. Upon returning to China, he felt the deep chasm between Chinese and American ideals and strove to "transform" China with civilization, an ambition shared by many others among him.

== History ==
On August 14, 1901, Tse Tsan-tai, Li Ki-tong, and Hong Quanfu convened to discuss plans for an uprising in Tse's apartment. Quanfu agreed to raise approximately 500 thousand yuan and convene the Hongmen in Guangdong to support the cause, and named the uprising the Shuntian; Tsan-tai proposed to occupy Guangzhou and call on Yung Wing to be the interim president; Ki-tong promised to bear all militarist capabilities of the state. The main headquarters were set up on D'Aguilar Street in Hong Kong, and multiple branch offices were set up through Guangzhou. Quanfu thus became the Shuntian Kingdom's General of Southern Guangdong, the triad leader Liang Muguang became Commander-in-Chief, and Ki-tong became the leader of the General Staff.

The main plan was to detonate a large amount of explosives in the Wanshou Palace in Guangdong, and after more than a year of preparations, the explosives indeed killed numerous officials celebrating the Chinese New Year in the palace on January 28, 1903. However, an anonymous tip was sent to the Hong Kong police department two or three days before the scheduled uprising, and news of the intended uprising leaked out. Letters about the delivery route, storage info, and the receiving men were seized. At the same time, Ki-tong ordered ammunition from the foreign companies in Hong Kong, who reported the case to the Guangzhou officials when the money failed to deliver on time, and in the end, arms given by Muguang and Quanfu were either intercepted by villagers or policemen. Many branch offices were raided by Qing officials shortly after, and more than 20 people associated with the revolutionary state were arrested. Several more strongholds were broken through under the orders of a thorough investigation by the Viceroy of Liangguang. Hong Quanfu, upon hearing the failure of the uprising in Xiangshan, cut his beard and fled to Singapore.

=== Legacy ===
The Shuntian Kingdom uprising is the last major uprising established by Western-educated Chinese Christians in the late Qing Dynasty, though Christians would continue to play an integral role in future revolutions. The uprising also helped to establish a much clearer line between the Chinese populace and the Qing government, with the ideas of revolution becoming more favorable among the intellectuals, students, and soldiers of Guangdong and beyond.
