= Dr Sun Yat-sen Historical Trail =

Chinese revolutionary's commemorative historical trail

Coordinates: 22.28221°N 114.15110°E

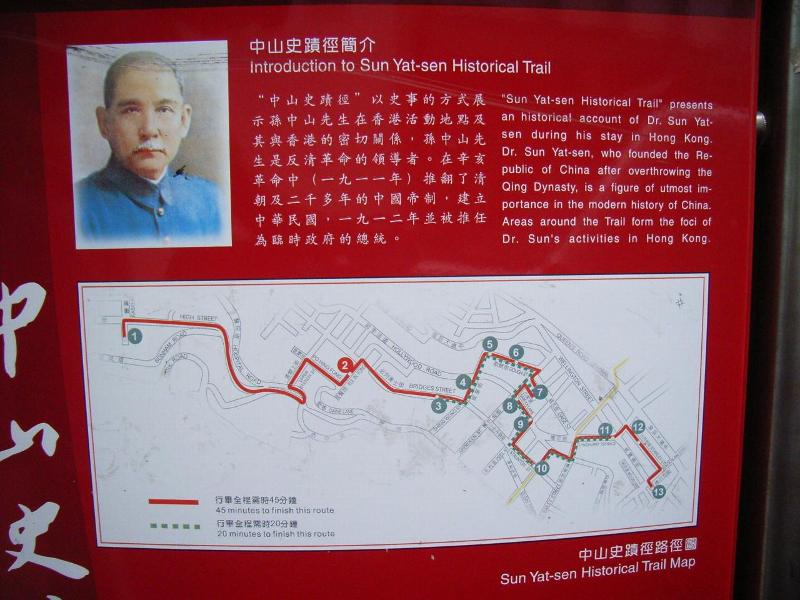
The Sun Yat-sen Historical Trail map in 2006.

The Dr Sun Yat-sen Historical Trail (Chinese: 孫中山史蹟徑) was set up in November 1996 by the Central and Western District Council to commemorate the 130th birthday of Sun Yat-sen. It includes 16 spots in the areas of Central and Sheung Wan in Hong Kong, related to the life of Sun Yat-sen and other revolutionaries in the late Qing era. Originally the Sun Yat-sen Historical Trail had 13 markers; in 2001, it was renovated and renamed, and two spots (now the 1st and the 7th spots) were added to it. In 2018, the trail was further updated under a Revitalization Project, where artists were commissioned by the government to create art at each location.

There are multiple bronze markers embedded in sidewalks and handrails throughout the city, noting the trail. Although about 600m north of the trail, the Sun Yat Sen Memorial Park in Sai Ying Pun contains a large concrete map of the trail near its main gate. The Dr Sun Yat-sen Museum was opened in 2006 and is about 200m south of the trail.

Name	Notes/Location	Photographs	Significance	References
1 - The University of Hong Kong	Bonham Road		Founded in 1911, the University of Hong Kong (HKU) is the city's oldest higher education institution. Sun Yat-sen studied at the College of Medicine for Chinese, Hongkong, from 1887 to 1892. This institution later became part of HKU’s Faculty of Medicine in 1912. Sun Yat-sen returned to HKU on February 20, 1923, where he delivered a speech describing Hong Kong and the university as his "intellectual birthplace."	
2 - Original site of the Diocesan Home and Orphanage	Eastern Street		Before pursuing his medical studies, Sun Yat-sen briefly attended the Diocesan Home and Orphanage in late 1883. Founded by the Anglican Church, the school provided Western-style education to Chinese students. Sun later transferred to Government Central School in April 1884, marking an essential step in his academic journey.	
3 - Original site of Tong Meng Hui Reception Centre	Po Hing Fong		Founded by Sun Yat-sen in 1905, the Tongmenghui’s Hong Kong branch established reception centers, including one at Po Hing Fong. These served as safe havens for revolutionaries and supported anti-Qing government activities.	
4 - Original site of the American Congregational Mission Preaching Hall	2 Bridges Street (now Bridges Street Market)		After arriving in Hong Kong, Sun Yat-sen lived at the American Congregational Mission Preaching Hall. He was baptized there and adopted the Christian name "Yat-sen." After transferring to the Government Central School, he continued to reside at the preaching hall.	
5 - Original site of the Government Central School	44 Gough Street		Founded in 1862, the Government Central School was Hong Kong’s first public school with a Western curriculum. Sun Yat-sen enrolled in 1884 and graduated in 1886.	
6 - Original site of the "Yeung Yiu Kee", meeting Place for "the Four Bandits"	8 Gough Street (marker located at intersection of Gough Street and Shin Hing Street)		While studying medicine, Sun Yat-sen met with friends at Yeung Yiu Kee on Gough Street to discuss politics and the anti-Qing cause. The group, known as the ‘Four Great Outlaws,’ held views considered radical at the time.	
7 - Site where Yeung Ku-wan was assassinated by Qing agents	52 Gage Street, corner of Aberdeen Street. The marker has been moved into Sam Ka Lane in Pak Tsz Lane Park, at the rear of 52 Gage Street.		Yeung Ku-wan, president of the Hong Kong branch of the Revive China Society, was assassinated in January 1901. The Qing government sent an assassin after Yeung’s failed uprisings in Guangzhou and Huizhou.	
8 - Original site of the Furen Literary Society	Pak Tsz Lane		Founded in 1892 by Yeung Ku-wan and Tse Tsan-tai, Foo Yan Man Ser at 1 Pak Tsz Lane focused on political discussions and reforms. Sun Yat-sen had close ties with its members, including Yeung and Tse, who later played key roles in the Revive China Society.	
9 - Original site of the Queen's College	Between Aberdeen Street and Hollywood Road. Markers in Hollywood Road and Staunton Street, along the walls of the Former Hollywood Road Police Married Quarters.		The foundation stone of the new Government Central School was laid on 26 April 1884, likely attended by Sun Yat-sen. The school became Victoria College in 1889 and Queen's College in 1894. In 1950, it moved to Causeway Bay, and the original site is now PMQ.	
10 - Original site of the Alice Memorial Hospital & the College of Medicine for Chinese, Hong Kong	77 to 81 Hollywood Road		Sun Yat-sen studied at the College of Medicine for Chinese, Hong Kong, after transferring from the Canton Hospital in 1887. He graduated in 1892, and the college became part of the University of Hong Kong's Faculty of Medicine in 1912.	
11 - Original site of the To Tsai Church	75 Hollywood Road		While studying medicine in Hong Kong, Sun Yat-sen lived at the College of Medicine for Chinese and often attended gatherings at To Tsai Church nearby. It was here that he built the network that would later support his revolutionary efforts. Both the church and Alice Memorial Hospital were founded by the London Missionary Society to aid the local Chinese community.	
12 - Original site of the Hong Kong Headquarters of Revive China Society	13 Staunton Street		In February 1895, Sun Yat-sen established the Hong Kong Headquarters of the Revive China Society at 13 Staunton Street, disguised as the Kuen Hang Club. The headquarters, led by Wong Wing-sheung, organized the first revolutionary attempt, the Guangzhou uprising.	
13 - Original site of the Heng Yin Lau Western Restaurant	2 Lyndhurst Terrace		Heng Yin Lau, a popular Western-style restaurant in late 19th-century Hong Kong, was located at the intersection of Lyndhurst Terrace and Pottinger Street. It was a favored meeting spot for Sun Yat-sen and his friends to discuss national affairs during his medical studies.	
14 - Original site of the China Daily Office	24 Stanley Street (marker located at 19 Stanley Street)		In 1899, Sun Yat-sen instructed Chan Siu-pak to establish The China Daily in Hong Kong as anti-Qing propaganda. The office, which opened in January 1900, was not only the publication site but also a meeting point for Revive China Society members and revolutionaries. The Huizhou uprising in 1900 was planned on the office's second floor.	
15 - Original site of Wo Kee Chan	20 D'Aguilar Street (marker located at 24 Wellington Street)		Wo Kee Chan, a seamen’s boarding house on the third floor of 20 D'Aguilar Street, was used as a base for revolutionary activities. It was here that the 1903 Guangzhou uprising was planned, led by Tse Tsan-tai and financially supported by Li Ki-tong. The uprising ultimately failed, and Tse later founded South China Morning Post to promote reform and revolution.	
16 - Hong Kong in the Time of Dr Sun Yat-sen	Intersection of Staunton Street and Shing Wong Street; is located close to spot #4.			
Example of bronze sidewalk marker	Intersection of Staunton Street and Graham Street			
Example of handrails	Shing Wong Street, between Staunton Street / Bridges Street and Hollywood Road			
Concrete map at Sun Yat Sen Memorial Park	Sun Yat Sen Memorial Park			
Information Poster	Central-Mid-levels escalator			
Information Poster	Central-Mid-levels escalator			
Direction Pole	Intersection of Gage and Cochrane Street			

== See also ==
- Heritage Trails in Hong Kong
- Dr Sun Yat-sen Museum, near the trail
- Sun Yat Sen Memorial Park
- Red House (Hong Kong)
