= Gage Street =

Street in Central, Hong Kong

Coordinates: 22.28327°N 114.15344°E

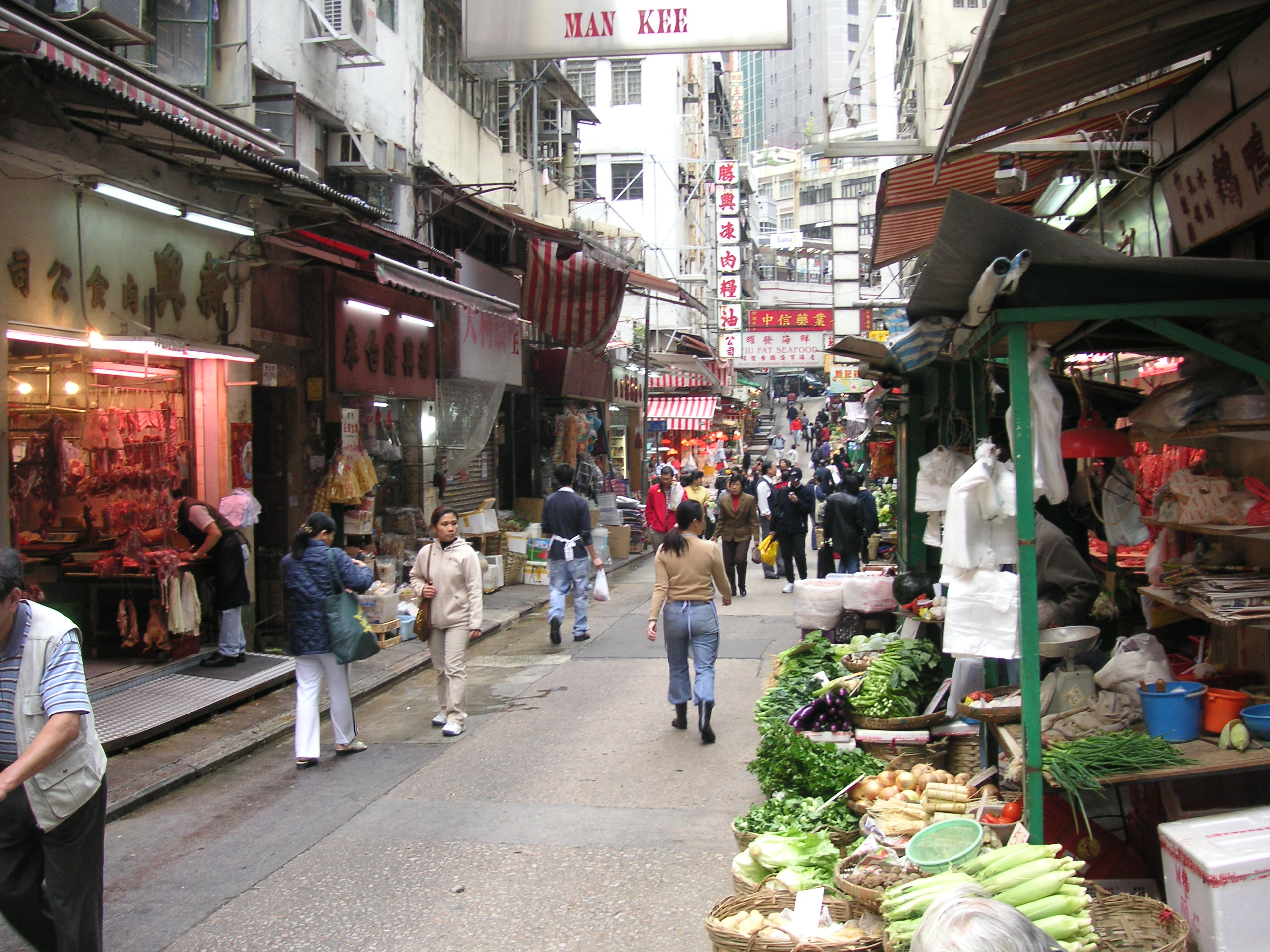
Gage Street Market

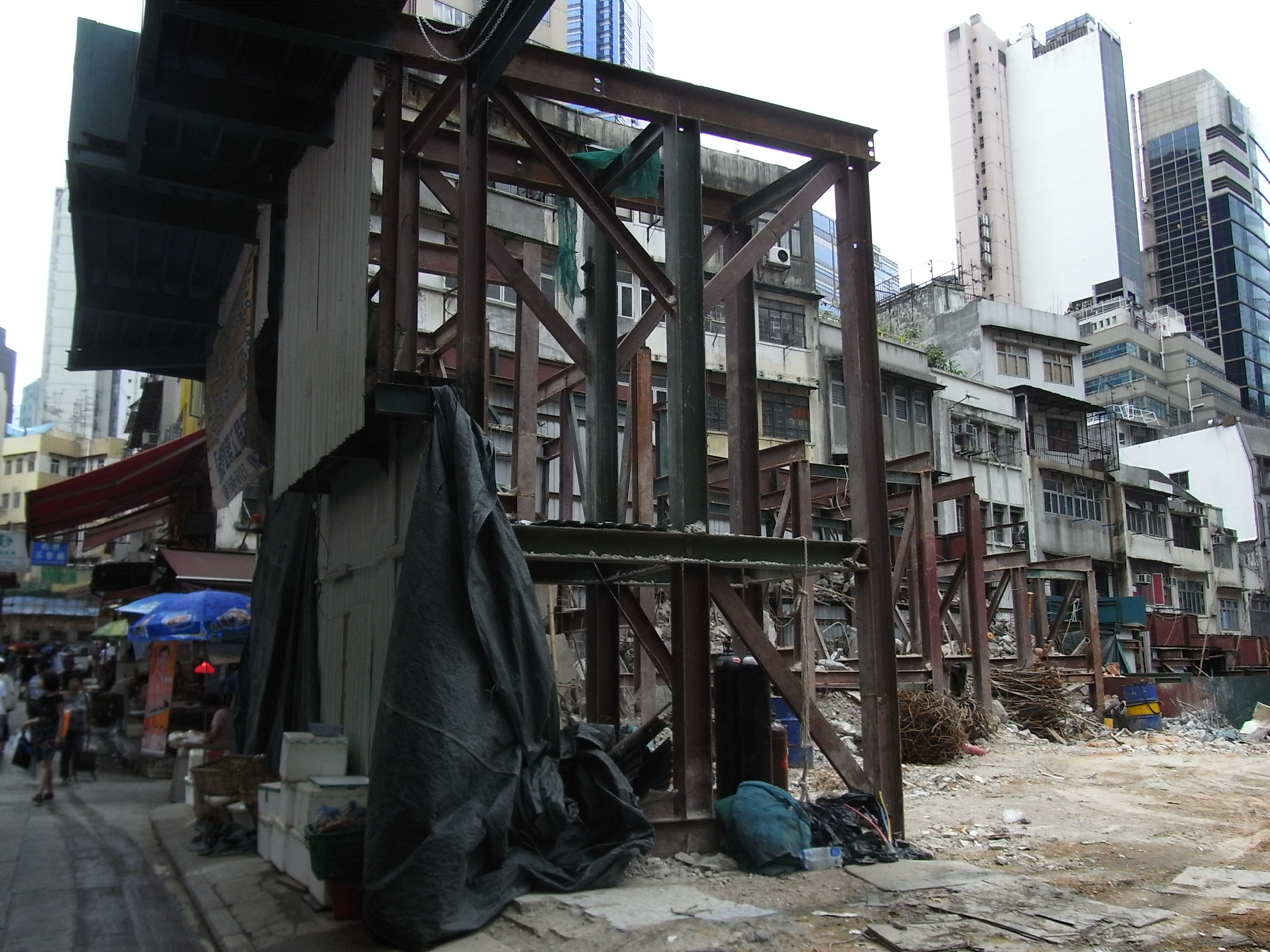
A construction site on Gage Street

Gage Street (Chinese: 結志街; Cantonese Yale: git3 ji3 gaai1) is a market street in Central, Hong Kong. It begins at the junction with Lyndhurst Terrace and Cochrane Street, near the Central–Mid-Levels Escalators, and descends gently in a straight line towards the junction with Aberdeen Street, intersecting with Graham Street and Peel Street along the way.

It is named after William Hall Gage.

== In popular culture ==
The 2013 novel Gage Street Courtesan by Christopher New depicts the European courtesans who lived in this street in the 19th century.

The 2009 film Bodyguards and Assassins begins with the assassination of Chinese revolutionary Yeung Ku-wan on Gage Street. The site of the assassination, 52 Gage Street, is part of the Dr Sun Yat Sen Historical Trail.

== See also ==
- List of streets and roads in Hong Kong
