= Bodyguards and Assassins =

2009 Hong Kong film by Teddy Chan

- Film poster

Chinese name
- Traditional Chinese: 十月圍城
- Simplified Chinese: 十月围城
Transcriptions
Standard Mandarin
- Hanyu Pinyin: Shíyuè Wéichéng
Yue: Cantonese
- Jyutping: Sap6 Jyut6 Wai4 Sing4
- Directed by: Teddy Chan
- Written by: Chun Tin-nam; James Yuen; Chan Wai; Guo Junli; Wu Bing; Joyce Chan
- Produced by: Peter Chan; Huang Jianxin; Jojo Hui
- Starring: Donnie Yen; Wang Xueqi; Tony Leung Ka-fai; Nicholas Tse; Hu Jun; Eric Tsang; Chris Lee; Fan Bingbing; Zhang Hanyu; Mengke Bateer; Wang Po-chieh; Leon Lai
- Cinematography: Arthur Wong
- Edited by: Derek Hui; Wong Hoi
- Music by: Chan Kwong-wing; Peter Kam
- Production companies: We Pictures; Cinema Popular; Polybona Films
- Distributed by: We Distributions; China Film Group
- Release date: 18 December 2009
- Running time: 138 minutes
- Country: Hong Kong
- Languages: Cantonese; Mandarin
- Budget: US$23 million
- Box office: US$5,837,674 (excluding China)

Bodyguards and Assassins is a 2009 Hong Kong historical action film directed by Teddy Chan, featuring an all-star cast including Donnie Yen, Wang Xueqi, Tony Leung Ka-fai, Nicholas Tse, Hu Jun, Chris Lee, Eric Tsang, Fan Bingbing, Zhang Hanyu, Wang Po-chieh, Mengke Bateer and Leon Lai. The film is about Sun Yat-sen making a secret trip to British-ruled Hong Kong to discuss plans with fellow revolutionaries to start a revolution to overthrow the Qing Empire and establish a republic in China. When Sun faces an attempt on his life by assassins sent by the Qing government, a motley crew of people from various walks of life band together to protect him and ensure that the meeting goes as planned.

== Plot ==
In 1905, Sun Wen intends to make a secret trip to British-ruled Hong Kong to discuss plans with fellow revolutionaries to overthrow the corrupt Qing Empire and establish a republic in China. When the Qing government learns of his trip, they send a group of assassins to infiltrate Hong Kong and assassinate him when he shows up. Ahead of Sun's arrival, newspaper editor Chen Shaobai meets businessman Li Yutang, who has been secretly financing the revolutionaries, to inform him about the upcoming meeting. Trouble also begins brewing in Hong Kong when Chen's acquaintances are murdered by the assassins, who also kidnap Chen during their raid. Li officially declares his support for the revolutionaries after the newspaper agency is closed by the British authorities, who do not interfere in the Chinese political situation. He also gathers a motley crew of people from all walks of life, including rickshaw pullers, hawkers and a beggar, to protect Sun and ensure that the meeting goes uninterrupted. Li's son, Chongguang, is selected to serve as Sun's decoy to distract the assassins while Sun attends the meeting and leaves Hong Kong safely.

== Cast ==
- Donnie Yen as Shen Chongyang, a policeman addicted to gambling and eager to do anything for money. He helps the bodyguards after Yueru persuades him to do so for their daughter's sake.
- Tony Leung Ka-fai as Chen Shaobai, the chief editor of China Daily in Hong Kong. He is kidnapped by the assassins during a raid but manages to escape and rejoin his comrades.
- Wang Xueqi as Li Yutang, a businessman and friend of Chen Shaobai. He initially provides only financial support to the revolutionaries, but openly declares his support for them later and gathers the bodyguards to protect Sun Wen.
- Fan Bingbing as Yueru, Li Yutang's fourth wife and Shen Chongyang's ex-wife. She and Shen have a daughter, who is raised as Li's child.
- Wang Po-chieh as Li Chongguang, Li Yutang's 17-year-old only son who is passionate about the revolutionaries' cause. He serves as Sun Wen's decoy to distract the assassins.
- Leon Lai as Liu Yubai, a beggar who used to be from a rich family. He fights with an iron fan and holds off the assassins alone at the residence of Sun Wen's mother.
- Nicholas Tse as "Si" (Deng Sidi), a rickshaw puller who serves the Li family faithfully and gathers his fellow rickshaw pullers to join the cause.
- Li Yuchun as Fang Hong, Fang Tian's daughter who joins the bodyguards after the assassins killed her father.
- Mengke Bateer as Wang Fuming, a stinky tofu vendor and former Shaolin monk who joins the bodyguards.
- Eric Tsang as Smith, the police chief who is initially reluctant to help the bodyguards due to orders from his British superiors. Later, he leads the police to protect the bodyguards' convoy from assassin marksmen.
- Hu Jun as Yan Xiaoguo, the assassin leader who is fiercely loyal to the Qing Empire.
- Zhang Hanyu as Sun Wen, the revolutionary leader who comes to Hong Kong for a secret meeting with fellow revolutionaries.
- Simon Yam as Fang Tian, a former general living in disguise with his men as an opera troupe in Hong Kong.
- Jacky Cheung as Yang Quyun, a pro-democracy English teacher and president of the Furen Literary Society. His death in the prologue marks the first political assassination in Hong Kong.
- Michelle Reis as Liu Yubai's lover
- Zhou Yun as Chun, Si's fiancée.
- Lü Zhong as Madame Yang, Sun Wen's mother.
- John Shum as Zhang Dayou, a photographer and Chun's father.
- Cung Le as Sa Zhenshan, an assassin.
- Philip Ng as Bai Que, an assassin.
- Xing Yu as Hei Man, an assassin.
- Dennis To as Nie Zhongqing, an assassin.

== Accolades ==
List of accolades
Ceremony	Category	Recipient	Outcome
4th Asian Film Awards	Best Film	Bodyguards and Assassins	Nominated
4th Asian Film Awards	Best Actor	Wang Xueqi	Won
4th Asian Film Awards	Best Supporting Actor	Nicholas Tse	Won
4th Asian Film Awards	Best Newcomer	Li Yuchun	Nominated
4th Asian Film Awards	Best Production Designer	Kenneth Mak	Nominated
4th Asian Film Awards	Best Costume Designer	Dora Ng	Nominated
29th Hong Kong Film Awards	Best Film	Bodyguards and Assassins	Won
29th Hong Kong Film Awards	Best Director	Teddy Chan	Won
29th Hong Kong Film Awards	Best Screenplay	Guo Junli, Qin Tiannan, Joyce Chan, Chan Tung-man	Nominated
29th Hong Kong Film Awards	Best Actor	Wang Xueqi	Nominated
29th Hong Kong Film Awards	Best Supporting Actor	Tony Leung Ka-fai	Nominated
29th Hong Kong Film Awards	Best Supporting Actor	Nicholas Tse	Won
29th Hong Kong Film Awards	Best Supporting Actress	Li Yuchun	Nominated
29th Hong Kong Film Awards	Best Supporting Actress	Fan Bingbing	Nominated
29th Hong Kong Film Awards	Best New Performer	Li Yuchun	Nominated
29th Hong Kong Film Awards	Best Cinematography	Arthur Wong	Won
29th Hong Kong Film Awards	Best Film Editing	Derek Hui, Wong Hoi	Nominated
29th Hong Kong Film Awards	Best Art Direction	Kenneth Mak	Won
29th Hong Kong Film Awards	Best Costume Make-Up Design	Dora Ng	Won
29th Hong Kong Film Awards	Best Action Choreography	Stephen Tung, Lee Tat-chiu	Won
29th Hong Kong Film Awards	Best Sound Design	Kinson Tsang, George Lee	Nominated
29th Hong Kong Film Awards	Best Visual Effects	Ng Yuen-fai, Chas Chau, Joe Tam, Yung Kwok-yin	Nominated
29th Hong Kong Film Awards	Best Original Film Score	Chan Kwong-wing, Peter Kam	Won
29th Hong Kong Film Awards	Best Original Film Song	Song: Powder (粉末) Composer: Chan Kwong-wing; Lyricist: Chris Shum; Singer: Li Yuchun	Nominated
16th Hong Kong Film Critics Society Awards	Film of Merit	Bodyguard and Assassins	Won
16th Hong Kong Film Critics Society Awards	Best Actor	Wang Xueqi	Won
47th Golden Horse Awards	Best Feature Film	Bodyguards and Assassins	Nominated
47th Golden Horse Awards	Best Director	Teddy Chan	Nominated
47th Golden Horse Awards	Best Actor	Wang Xueqi	Nominated
47th Golden Horse Awards	Best Supporting Actor	Nicholas Tse	Nominated
47th Golden Horse Awards	Best Cinematography	Arthur Wong	Nominated
47th Golden Horse Awards	Best Visual Effects	Ng Yuen-fai, Chas Chau, Joe Tam, Yung Kwok-yin	Nominated
47th Golden Horse Awards	Best Costume Make-Up Design	Dora Ng	Won
47th Golden Horse Awards	Best Action Choreography	Stephen Tung, Lee Tat-chiu	Nominated
47th Golden Horse Awards	Best Film Editing	Hui Wan-yu, Wong Hoi	Nominated
5th Huading Awards	Best Supporting Actor	Nicholas Tse	Won

== See also ==
- List of Hong Kong films of 2009

Awards and achievements
Preceded by Ip Man	Hong Kong Film Award for Best Film; 2010	Succeeded by Gallants
