= Yeung Ku-wan =

Chinese revolutionary (1861–1901)

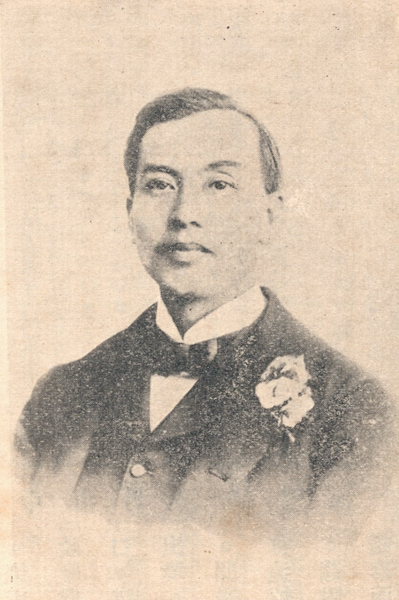
- Early anti-Qing dynasty revolutionary
- Born: 19 December 1861; Dongguan, Guangdong, Qing China
- Died: 11 January 1901 (aged 39); British Hong Kong

Yeung Ku-wan
- Traditional Chinese: 楊衢雲
- Simplified Chinese: 杨衢云
Transcriptions
Standard Mandarin
- Hanyu Pinyin: Yáng Qúyún
- Wade–Giles: Yang^{2} Ch'ü^{2}-yün^{2}
Yue: Cantonese
- Yale Romanization: Yèuhng Kèuih wàhn
- Jyutping: Joeng^{4} Keoi^{4} Wan^{4}

Yeung Fei-hung
- Traditional Chinese: 楊飛鴻
- Simplified Chinese: 杨飞鸿
Transcriptions
Standard Mandarin
- Hanyu Pinyin: Yáng Fēihóng
Yue: Cantonese
- Yale Romanization: Yèuhng Fēi hùhng
- Jyutping: joeng^{4} fei^{1} hung^{4}

Siu-chun
- Traditional Chinese: 肇春
Transcriptions
Standard Mandarin
- Hanyu Pinyin: Zhào chūn
Yue: Cantonese
- Yale Romanization: Siuh chēun
- Jyutping: Siu^{6} ceon^{1}

Yeung Ku-wan (19 December 1861 – 11 January 1901) was a Chinese revolutionary of the late Qing dynasty. In 1890, Yeung started the Furen Literary Society in British Hong Kong to spread ideas of revolution against the Qing dynasty and to establish a republic in China. He became the first President of the Hong Kong Chapter of the Revive China Society in 1894 and was, with Sun Yat-sen, in charge of planning an uprising in Canton (now Guangzhou) in 1895 and in Huizhou in 1900. Yeung was assassinated in 1901 in Hong Kong by an agent sent by the Qing government.

== Names ==
Born Yeung Fei-hung (楊飛鴻), his style name was Siu-chun (肇春). He signed himself 'Yeung Küwan' when he lived in Hong Kong and is now known as Yeung Ku-wan.

== Biography ==
Yeung's ancestral home was in Haicheng (海澄; a town in present-day Longhai City, Fujian), but he was born in Fumen Walled City, Dongguan, Guangdong. At a young age, he followed his father to Hong Kong and was educated in St. Paul's College. When he was 14, Yeung learned how to operate machinery in a shipyard but an accident caused him to lose three fingers from his right hand. He switched to reading English and became a teacher after graduating. Later, he worked in the Zhaoshangju (招商局; now the China Merchants Group) as its chief secretary, as well as being a vice-manager in the Sassoon Maritime Company (沙遜洋行).

Yeung's knowledge of Chinese was scanty and he tried to improve it when he became involved in politics. His experiences in Hong Kong had given him a pugnacious nationalism: boxing was one of his hobbies and he was quick with his fists when he encountered foreigners taking advantage of Chinese people. His extensive reading of Western literature enabled him to speak with authority on revolutionary theory and history, and he is said to have dominated discussions on these subjects. He would instinctively assume the seat of honour at social gatherings and was not to be interrupted during his discourses.

On 13 March 1892, Yeung, together with Tse Tsan-tai and others, started the Furen Literary Society (輔仁文社) in Pak Tsz Lane, Sheung Wan, with Yeung as their leader and the guiding principles of "Open up the people's minds" (開通民智) and "Love your country with all your heart" (盡心愛國). The society released books and papers discussing the future of China and advocating the overthrow of the Qing government and establishment of a republic in China. Yeung was also a member of the Hongmen (洪門), an anti-government secret organisation.

In November 1894, Sun Yat-sen founded the Revive China Society (Xingzhonghui) in Honolulu, Hawaii. He returned to Hong Kong in early 1895 and met up again with Yeung, whom he had first met in 1891. As they both wanted to take advantage of the uneasy political situation due to the First Sino-Japanese War, on 18 February 1895 the Furen Literary Society was merged into the Revive China Society, with help from Yau Lit, a close friend of Sun and member of Furen. Yeung and Sun became the President and Secretary of the Society respectively. They disguised their activities in Hong Kong under the guise of running a "Qianheng Company" (乾亨行).

In October 1895, the Revive China Society planned to launch an uprising in Guangzhou, with Yeung directing the uprising from Hong Kong. However, their plans leaked out and more than 70 members, including Lu Hao-tung, were captured by the Qing government.

Under pressure from the Qing government in China, the British Hong Kong government forced Yeung and Sun Yat-sen to leave, barring them from entering Hong Kong over the next five years. Yeung travelled to Johannesburg, South Africa, via Singapore and later to Japan, where he stayed from 1896 to 1899, to expand the Revive China Society and spread its ideas. While in Japan, he also gave private tuition in English.

His relationship with Sun Yat-sen was complicated: Yeung was President (and Sun was Secretary) when his Furen Literary Society first merged with Sun's Revive China Society in 1895 (renamed as the Hong Kong chapter of the Hing Chong Hui). However Sun gradually became more powerful and edged Yeung out, resulting in Yeung resigning (as President) in 1899, to be succeeded by Sun Yat-sen.

=== Assassination ===
In 1900, Yeung started another uprising in Huizhou, Guangdong, but this also failed. He returned to Hong Kong and taught English in a school at Gage Street to support his family. On 10 January 1901, around 6 pm, Yeung was shot in the head and chest (while tutoring students on the second floor of his home with his young child seated on his lap) by Chen Lin (陳林), an assassin sent by the Qing government. He died from his wounds the following day and was buried in the Hong Kong Cemetery in Happy Valley. His tomb was completed on 23 December 1901.

After Yeung died, Sun issued formal condolences and initiated fundraising for Yeung's family.

== Condolence letter from Sun Yat-sen ==
Almost a month after Yeung Ku-wan had been assassinated, Sun Yat-sen, who was in Japan having been exiled from Hong Kong, sent a letter of condolence to Tse Tsan-tai. During a meeting to mourn Yeung's death, Sun Yat-sen expressed his sadness and stated that he and his companions had managed to collect 1000 silver dollars to assist Yeung's widow and family. The comrades expressed their sadness and several gave speeches about Yeung's life and his ambitions. The money was to be delivered to the Hong Kong China Daily newspaper which would pass it on to Yeung's family. The newspaper also promised to help the family in other ways too. Sun Yat-sen's eulogy was also sent to many of their colleagues in both east and west Japan.

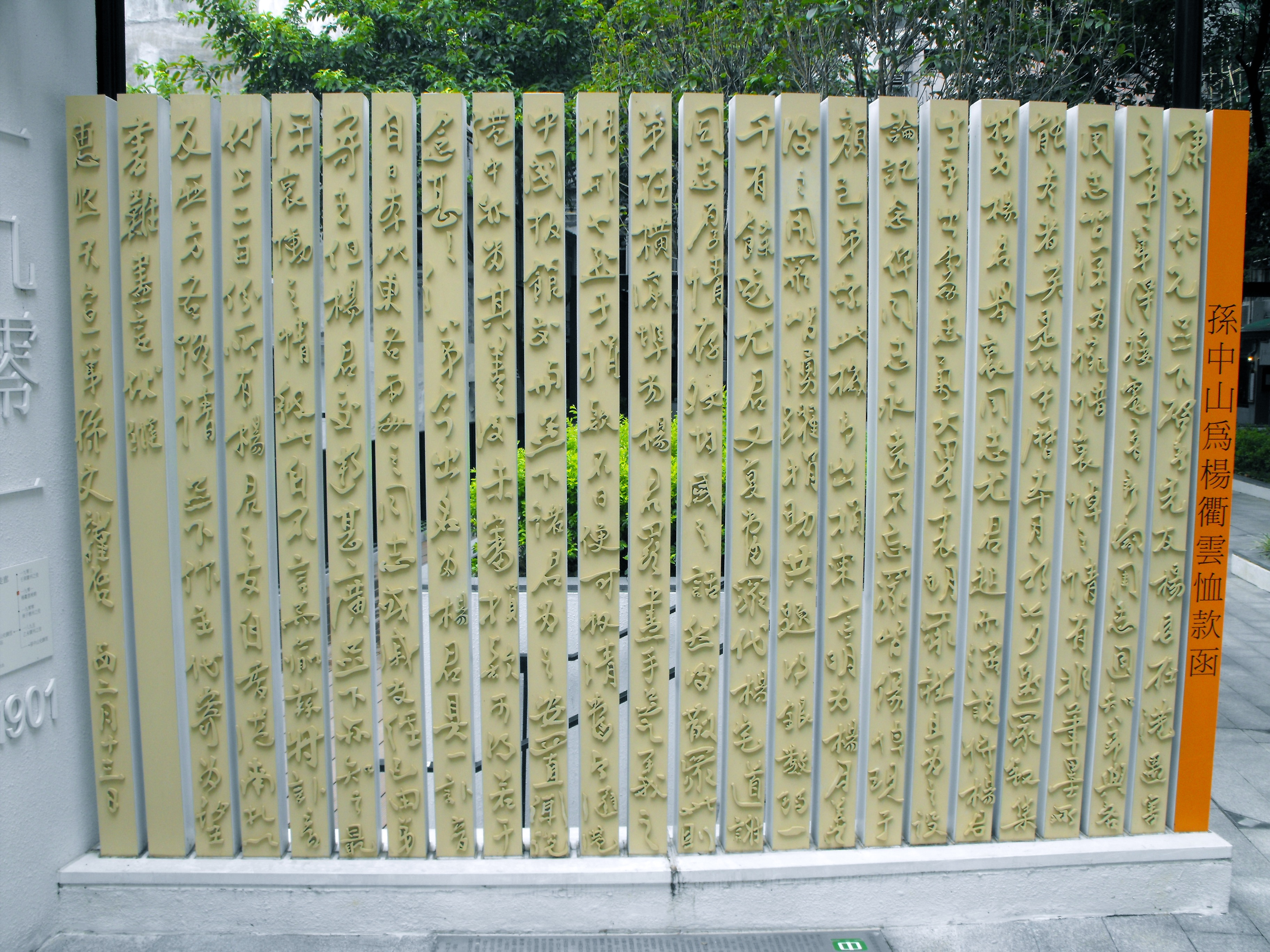

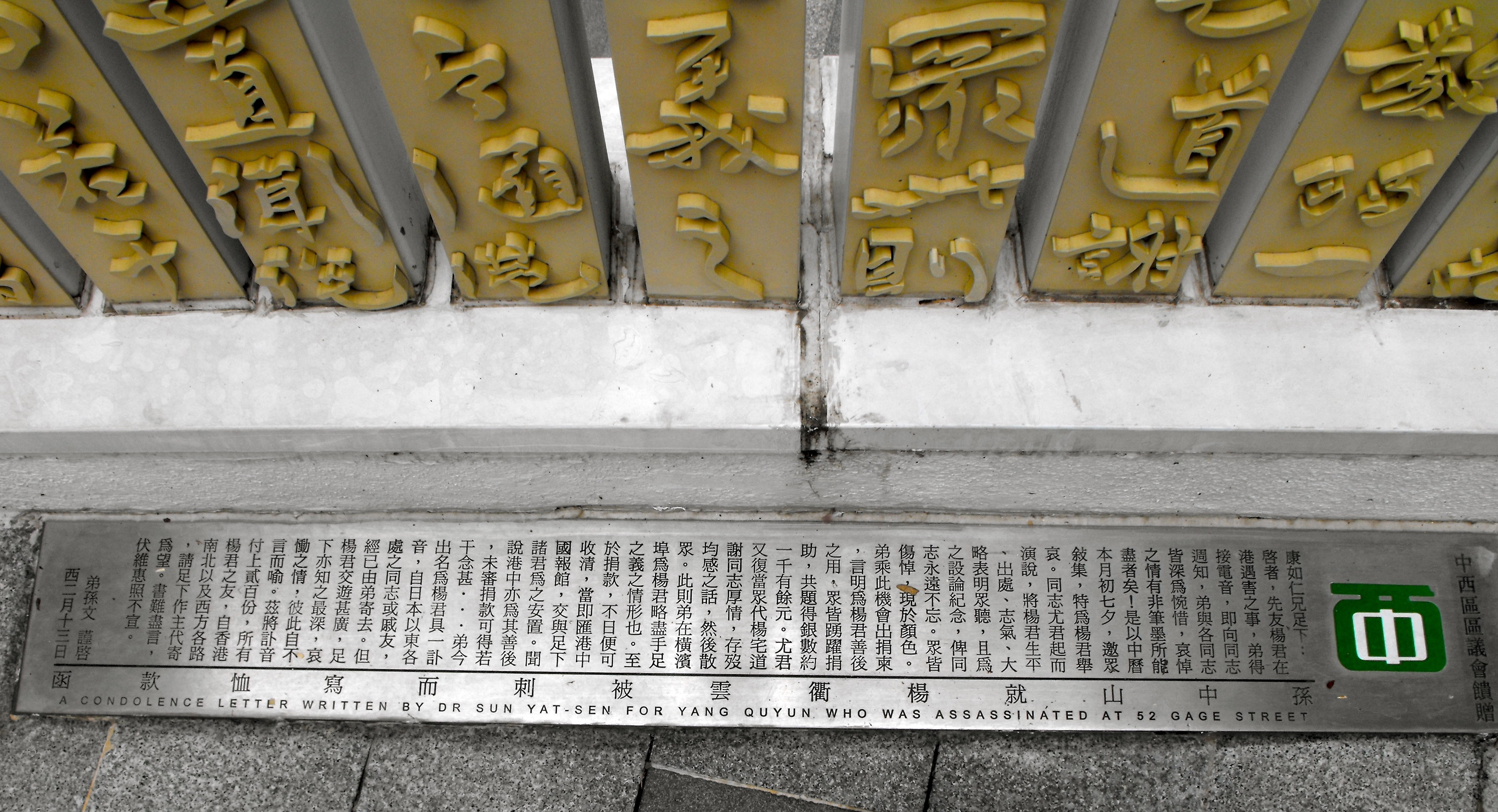
Sun Yatsen's Letter of Condolence for Yeung Ku-wan in running script (top) and in regular script (bottom), displayed in Pak Tsz Lane Park

Dear Kang Ru [Editor's note: Tse Tsan-tai]
As you know, our friend Yeung was assassinated in Hong Kong a few days ago [Editor's note: 11 January 1901]. When I got this bad news, I passed it onto all our comrades immediately. Myself and all comrades are so full of grief, indignation and extreme sadness that we can not find words to express our feelings! Having failed to gather everybody for a mourning service on 26 January, I organised a meeting on the 7th this month with all the friends and comrades to remember Yeung.

Comrade You stood up first and gave a brief speech about Yeung's whole life, where he was from, his ambitions and his vision when confronting problems. We used this ceremony to pay tribute to Yeung. We will never forget him. At the ceremony many Comrades could not hold their emotion, and they cried and shouted….

I personally used this opportunity to call for donations to support Yeung's family. All the comrades gave a donation, and the total is 1000 silver dollars. Then Comrade You thanked all the friends for their generous support on behalf of Yeung's family. After that the ceremony finished.

This is only one of the few things I can do for my and Yeung's brotherhood in Japan. The money will be collected and placed with the Hong Kong China Daily Newspaper [name?]. It will then be delivered to you and other comrades. Please use the money well. I heard that the Hong Kong Newspaper also will help Yeung's family in the future. But I do not know how much money they gave to the family.

I have written a eulogy letter for Yeung and have sent it to all the friends, comrades and relatives from east Japan to west. But I know Yeung had so many friends. I knew him very well, so I have made hundreds of copies of this eulogy letter for all the friends from Hong Kong and the western world. Please help me to send the letter to them on my behalf.

However, a letter always cannot explain everything, but please take care and keep in touch

Brother Sun Wen wrote this.

Western calendar
13 Feb [1901]

The letter, in Sun Yatsen's writing, is displayed in the Pak Tsz Lane Park, close to where Yeung Ku-wan was assassinated.

== Subsequent events ==
It was Yeung's wish before he died that his tombstone be anonymous, so his tombstone was inscribed with only the serial number "6348" to avoid being recognized and desecrated by the Qing government.

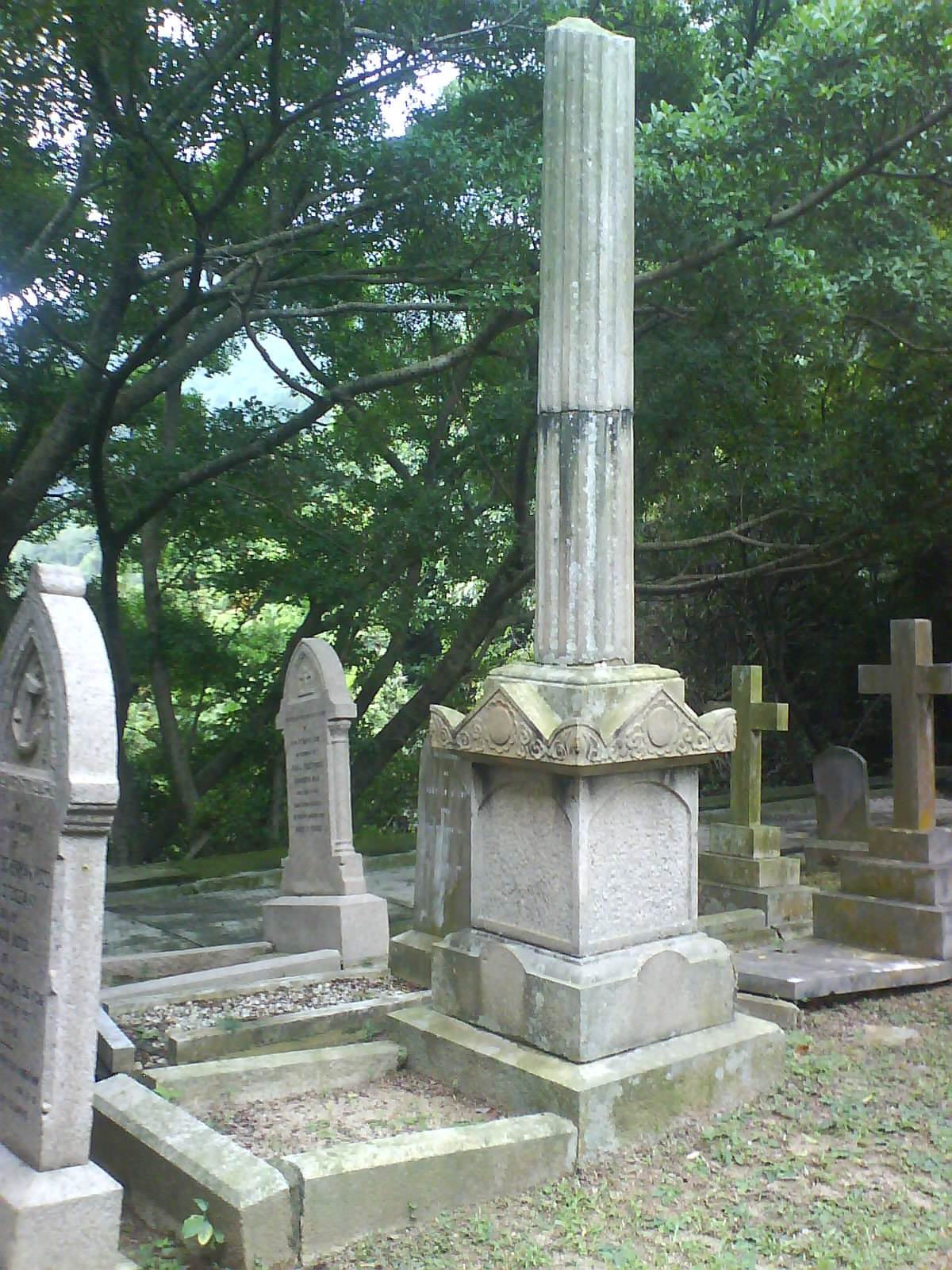
The unnamed tomb of Yeung Ku-wan in the Hong Kong cemetery, Happy Valley, Hong Kong

After the Xinhai Revolution in 1911 that overthrew the Qing Dynasty, former members of the Revive China Society suggested to the new republican government that the body of Yeung be exhumed and reburied in Huanghuagang Park, Guangzhou, along with the remains of the other 72 martyrs of the Guangdong uprising. However, the government did not accept this.

In December 1921, soon after Chiang Kai-shek married his second wife, Ch'en Chieh-ju, she asked him why he wanted to win the confidence of Sun Yat-sen. Chiang replied that "Dr. Sun is the greatest Chinese of the century." She then told Chiang that she had been "taught that Yeung Ch'u-yun (Yeung Ku-wan) of Hong Kong was the patron saint of our Republic". He said, "No, Yeung Ch'u-yun was a pioneer only and was assassinated. I believe Dr. Sun should definitely be the patron".

Following the death of Sun Yat-sen in 1925, Chiang Kai-shek became the leader of the Chinese Nationalist Party in 1926. In 1927, when he was setting up the Nationalist government in Nanjing, he was preoccupied with "the elevation of our leader Dr. Sun Yat-sen to the rank of 'Father of our Chinese Republic'. Dr. Sun worked for 40 years to lead our people in the Nationalist cause, and we cannot allow any other personality to usurp this honored position". He asked Chen Guofu (at the time Head of the Kuomintang Department of Organisation) to purchase a photograph that had been taken in Japan in around 1895 or 1898. It showed members of the Revive China Society, with Yeung presiding and Sun, as secretary, on the back row, along with members of the Japanese Chapter of the Revive China Society. When told that it was not for sale, Chiang offered a million dollars to recover the photo and its negative. "The party must have this picture and the negative at any price. They must be destroyed as soon as possible. It would be embarrassing to have our Father of the Chinese Republic shown in a subordinate position". Chiang never obtained either the photo or its negative. In fact, it was kept safe by the family of Tse Tsan-tai.

Following a visit to Yeung's ancestral home (Hai Cang Qu, Xiamen, Fujian Province) by Yeung Kui-wan's cousin, Yeung Bat-fan, in 1988, the people started a collection to pay for a statue to Yeung Kui-wan. The local government erected the statue at the entrance to the village, on Xia Yang Lu, in 1998.

Since 2004, Yeung Ku-wan's nephew Yeung Hing-on has actively campaigned for official recognition of the important role his uncle played in the early revolutionary movement against the Qing Dynasty. In particular, he hoped that the planned park at Pak Tsz Lane (see below) would be named after Yeung Ku-wan or the Furen Literary Society that met near there.

Due to his efforts, a commemorative marker has been placed near the house at 52 Gage Street, where Yeung Ku-wan was assassinated.

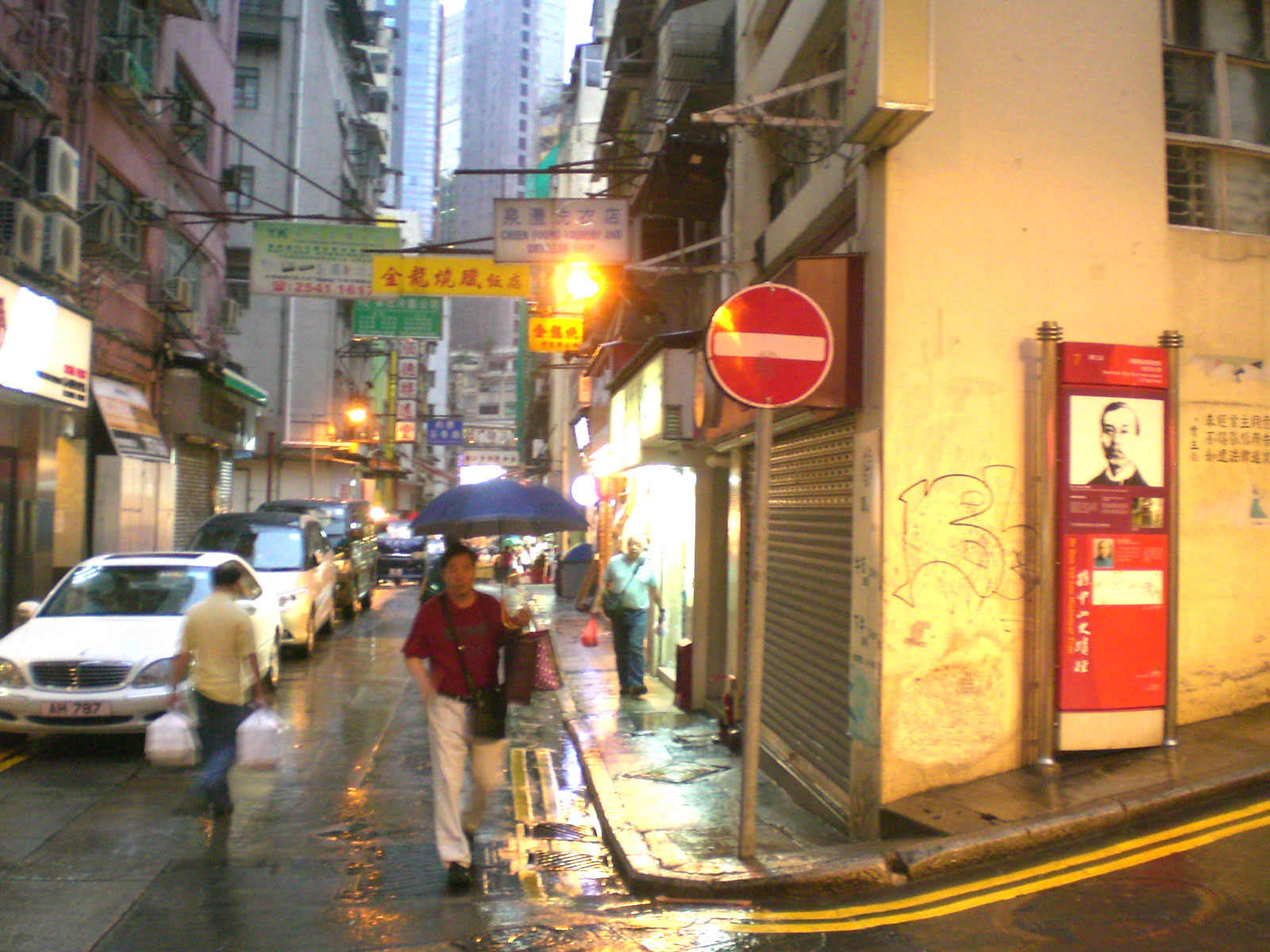
Commemorative marker of the site where Yeung Ku-wan was assassinated. Located at 52 Gage Street, corner of Aberdeen Street, Hong Kong. The marker is part of the Dr Sun Yat-sen Historical Trail and of the Central and Western Heritage Trail. Note: as of August 2012, the plaque has been moved to Sam Ka Lane, the passageway at rear of 52 Gage Street

In March 2011, the Permanent Secretary for Home Affairs of Hong Kong, Raymond Young, announced that "in order to honour the Qing revolutionary Mr. Yeung Ku-wan and Hong Kong's important role in the revolutionary movement, the Government will erect an information plaque beside Mr. Yeung's unnamed tomb at the Hong Kong Cemetery in Happy Valley Cemetery to highlight his revolutionary deeds." In May 2011, work began on the park, which is to be named 'Pak Tse Lane Garden'.

In August 2011, it was reported in the South China Morning Post (SCMP) that the promised information plaque would be installed alongside Yeung's unnamed tomb "next month" (Note that the SCMP was founded by Tse Tsan-tai, the first treasurer of the Furen Literary Society.).

In September 2011, the Hong Kong authorities place next to his tomb a granite plaque giving the story of Yeung Ku-wan – 110 years after he was assassinated and in time for the 100th anniversary celebrations of the Xinhai Revolution, which resulted in the Chinese Republic that Yeung Ku-wan fought and died for.

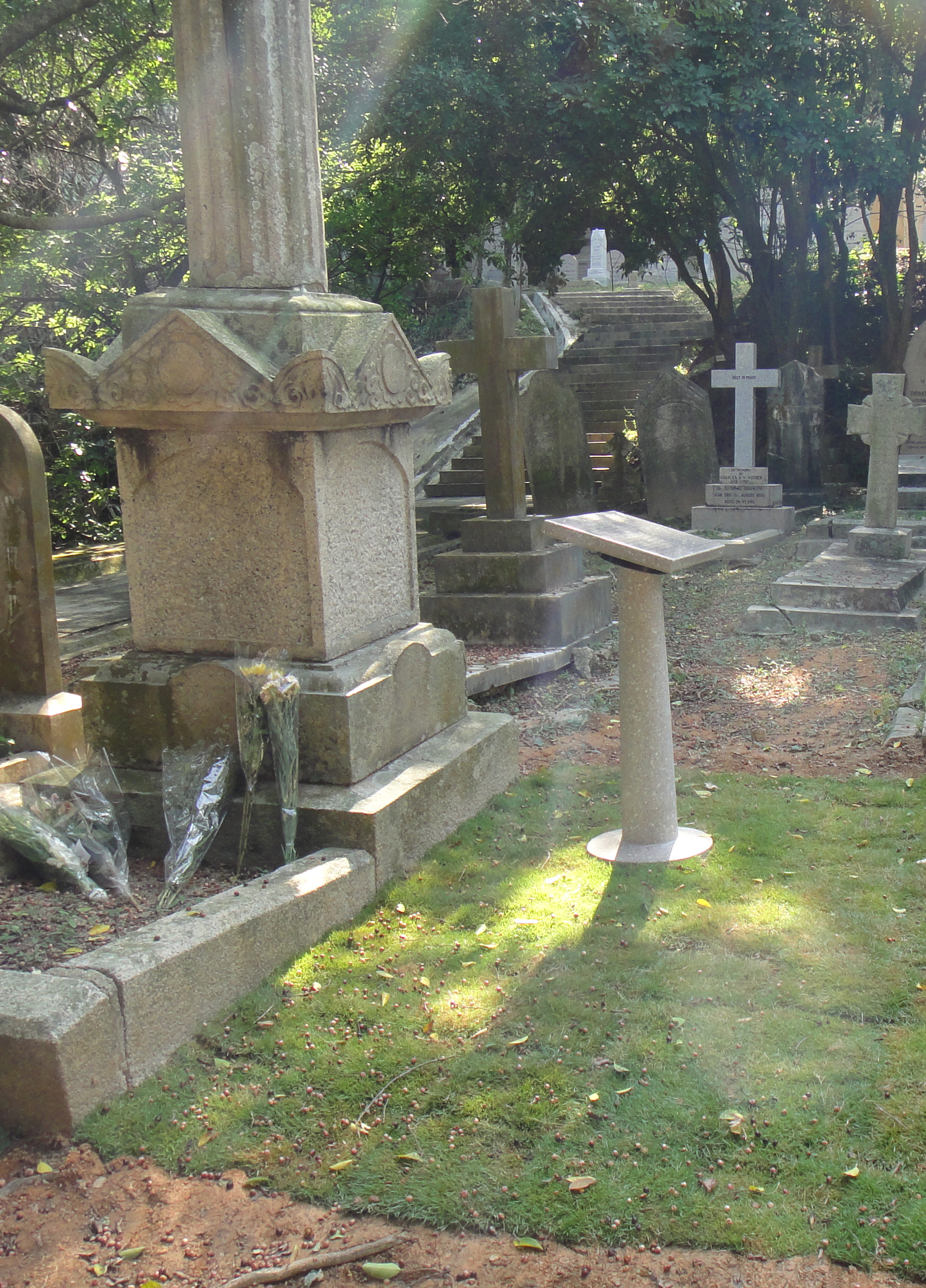
Yeung Kui-wan's grave with plaque

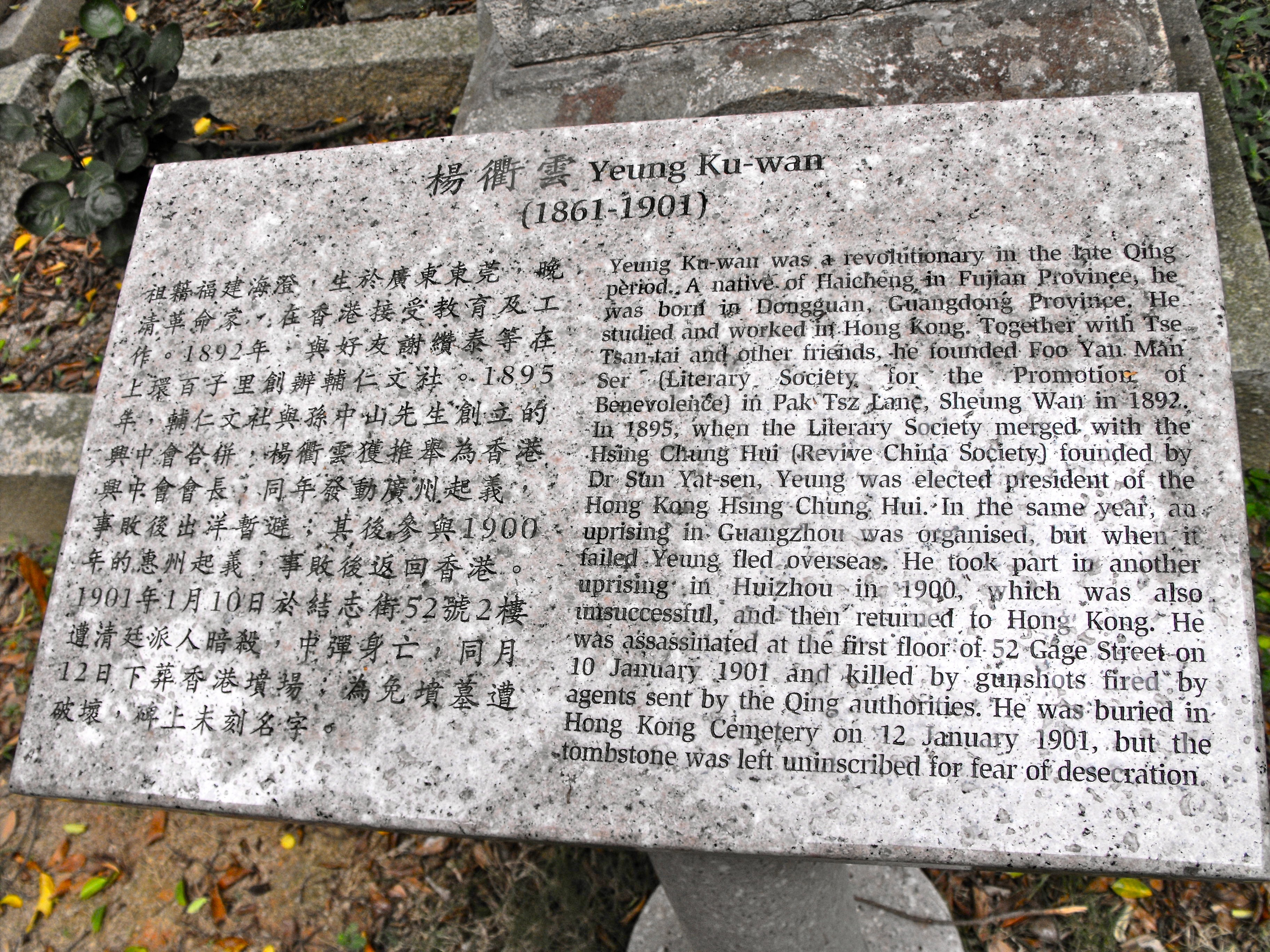
Plaque at Yeung Ku-wan's grave, placed by the Hong Kong Government, September 2011

In August 2013, Stuart Heaver in a SCMP report points out that, strangely, in the official police report for 1901, the murder of Yeung Ku-wan is restricted to 2½ lines – and mistakenly gives Yeung's age as 84 – even though there were only four murders in the city that year.

In the same report, Heaver also reveals a number of intriguing aspects about Yeung Ku-wan:

- Albert Yeung Hing-on says that his father (Yeung Ku-wan's nephew) always said his uncle's killing was a personal vendetta, not a political assassination.
- The inclusion of Yeung's story on the Sun Yat-sen heritage trail and also the new memorial for the Furen Wenshe (Pak Tsz Lane Park) is largely due to the work of historian Dr Joseph Ting Sun-pao, who was chief curator of the Hong Kong Museum of History and who oversaw the establishment of the Dr Sun Yat-sen Museum before his retirement in December 2006.
- Dr Ting also had located evidence in Taiwan that revealed that once the Chinese republic had been established, Tse Tsan Tai and some of Yeung Ku-wan's other colleagues made a formal request for Yeung's body to be removed from Hong Kong to its rightful place in the revolutionary cemetery in Guangzhou. Ting found official documents that showed the request was eventually refused on the grounds that the revolutionary's "stance against the Qing had wavered" during the 1900 Huizhou uprising.
- Dr Ting said that "All the funds came through Yeung Ku-wan and he had all the connections," and "that [he] had a more important role in the very early days of the revolution than Sun Yat-sen, who was [then] just a young medical graduate."
- When asked about why Yeung did not flee Hong Kong after the 1900 uprising, when his life was clearly in danger, Dr Ting's answer is unexpected: "I think he was British, otherwise he would not have been buried in the cemetery in Happy Valley."
- It is known that the colonial authorities had issued Yeung with a firearm for his own protection and he enjoyed a close relationship with the British, but Dr Ting believes he must also have been made a British subject, perhaps even a citizen.

== Family ==
Yeung Ku-wan's father Yeung Ching-seoi (Chinese: 楊清水; pinyin: Yáng Qīngshuǐ) was originally from Haicheng (present-day Haicang District, Xiamen, Fujian). Yeung Ching-seoi was educated in Malaya (now Malaysia). When he grew up, he tried farming in his hometown before working on ocean-bound ships. Due to illness, Yeung Ching-seoi probably went to Hong Kong in the 1860s, 'when Yeung Ku-wan was still quite young'. After he had recovered, he worked for the British colonial government in Hong Kong as a secretary and married Yeung Ku-wan's mother. The family name of Yeung Kui-wan's mother was Cheng (Chinese: 鄭; pinyin: Zhèng), and she was from Humen. Yeung Ching-seoi and his wife had a son (Yeung Ku-wan) and two daughters. Yeung Ching-seoi continued to work in the shipping business and taught English in his later years.

Yeung Ku-wan's wife's family name was Poon (Chinese: 潘; pinyin: Pān). He had three daughters by her – Yeung Gam-ha (Chinese: 楊錦霞; pinyin: Yáng Jǐnxiá), Yeung Lai-ha (Chinese: 楊麗霞; pinyin: Yáng Lìxiá), and Yeung Sau-ha (Chinese: 楊秀霞; pinyin: Yáng Xìuxiá).

== Media appearances ==
The beginning of the 2009 film Bodyguards and Assassins briefly features the assassination of Yeung Ku-wan, who was played by Jacky Cheung.

== See also ==
- Timeline of late anti-Qing rebellions
