= Aberdeen Street =

Street on Hong Kong Island, Hong Kong

Coordinates: 22°17′00″N 114°09′08″E

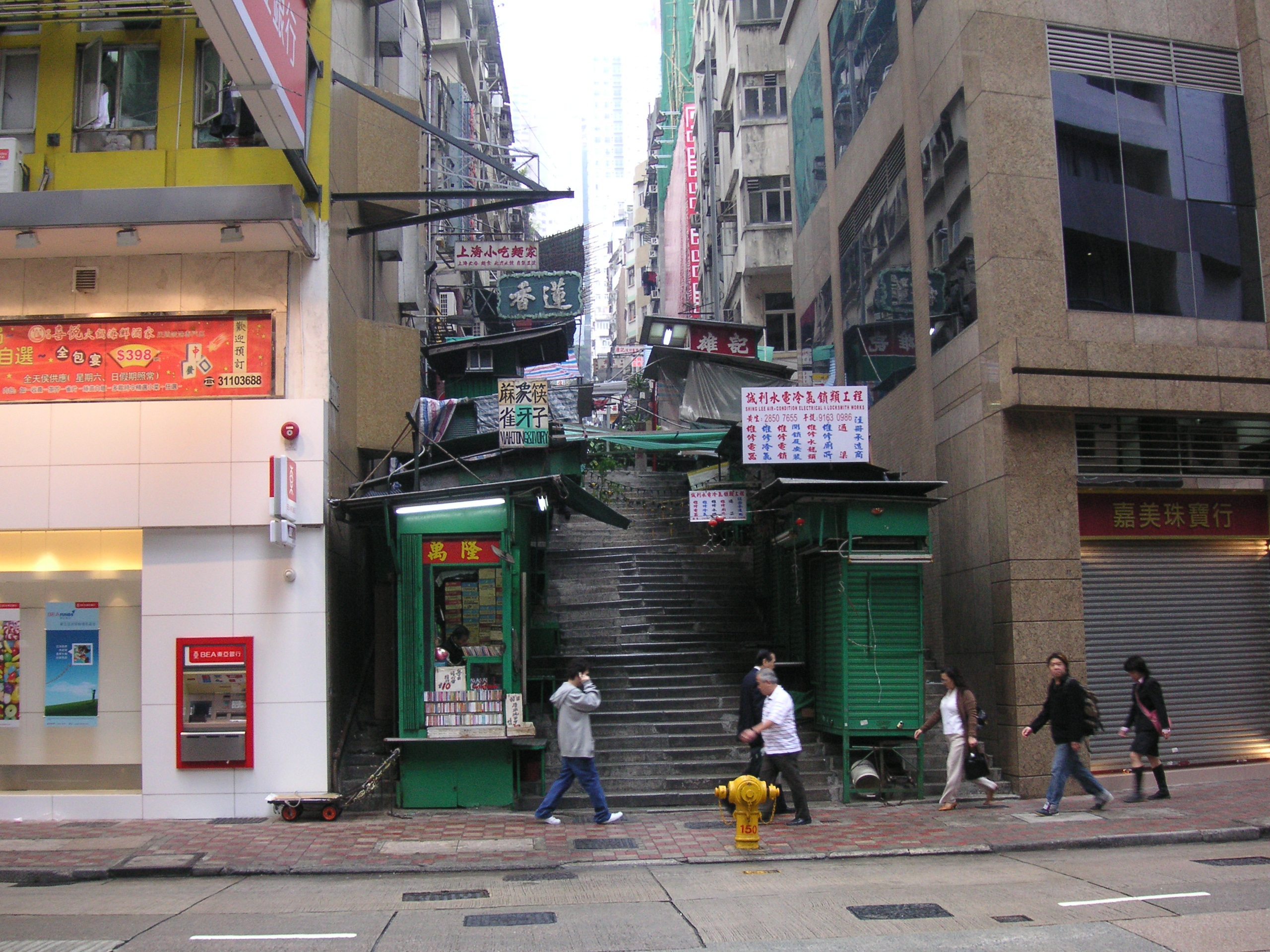
- Aberdeen Street at Queen's Road Central
- Interactive map of Aberdeen Street
- Native name: 鴨巴甸街 (Chinese)
- Namesake: George Hamilton-Gordon, 4th Earl of Aberdeen
- Location: Central / Sheung Wan, Hong Kong
- From: Queen's Road Central
- To: Caine Road

Aberdeen Street
- Traditional Chinese: 鴨巴甸街
Transcriptions
Yue: Cantonese
- Yale Romanization: Ngaap bā dīn gāai
- Jyutping: Ngaap3 ba1 din1 gaai1

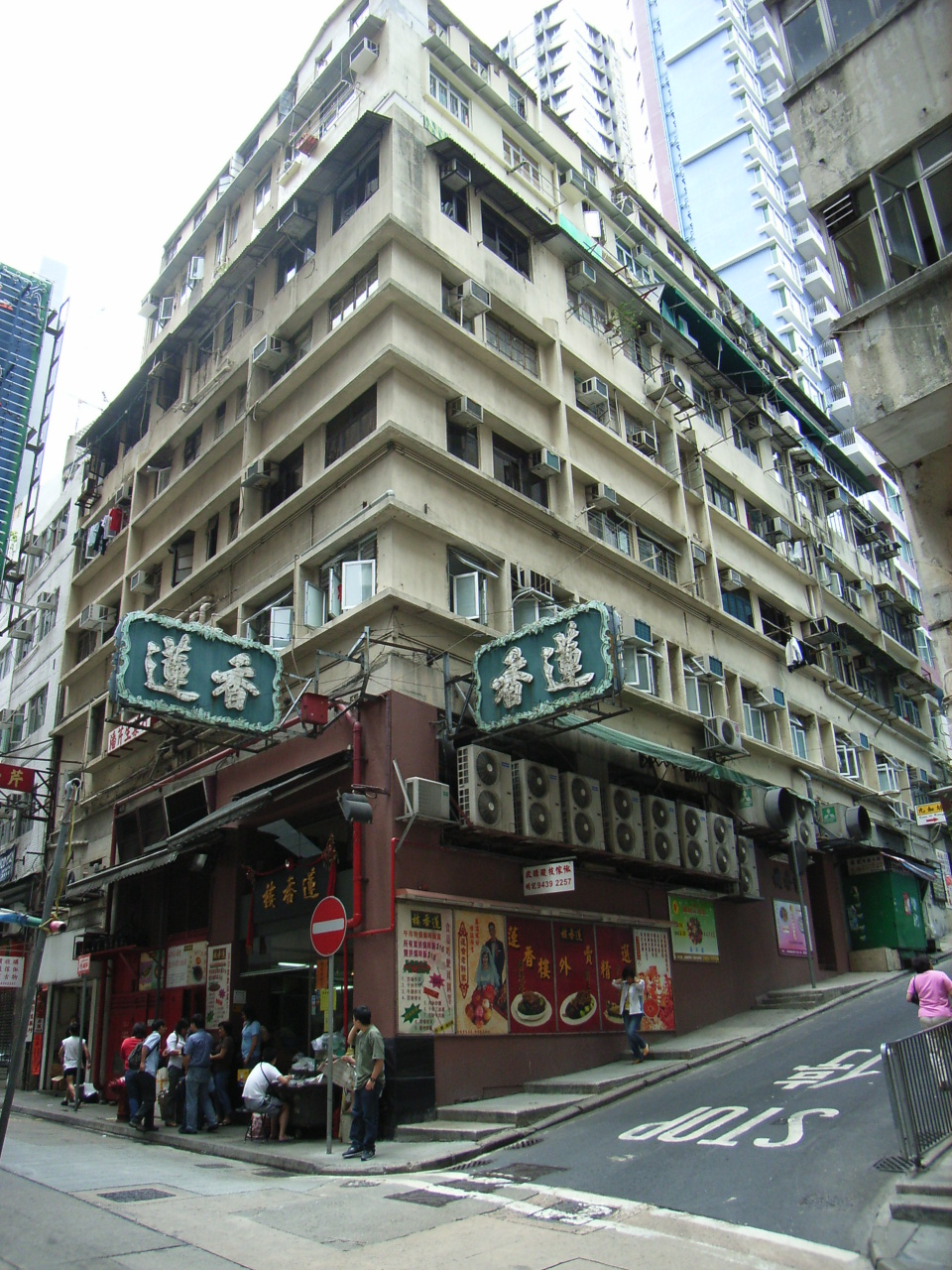
Lin Heung Tea House, at the corner of Aberdeen Street and Wellington Street.

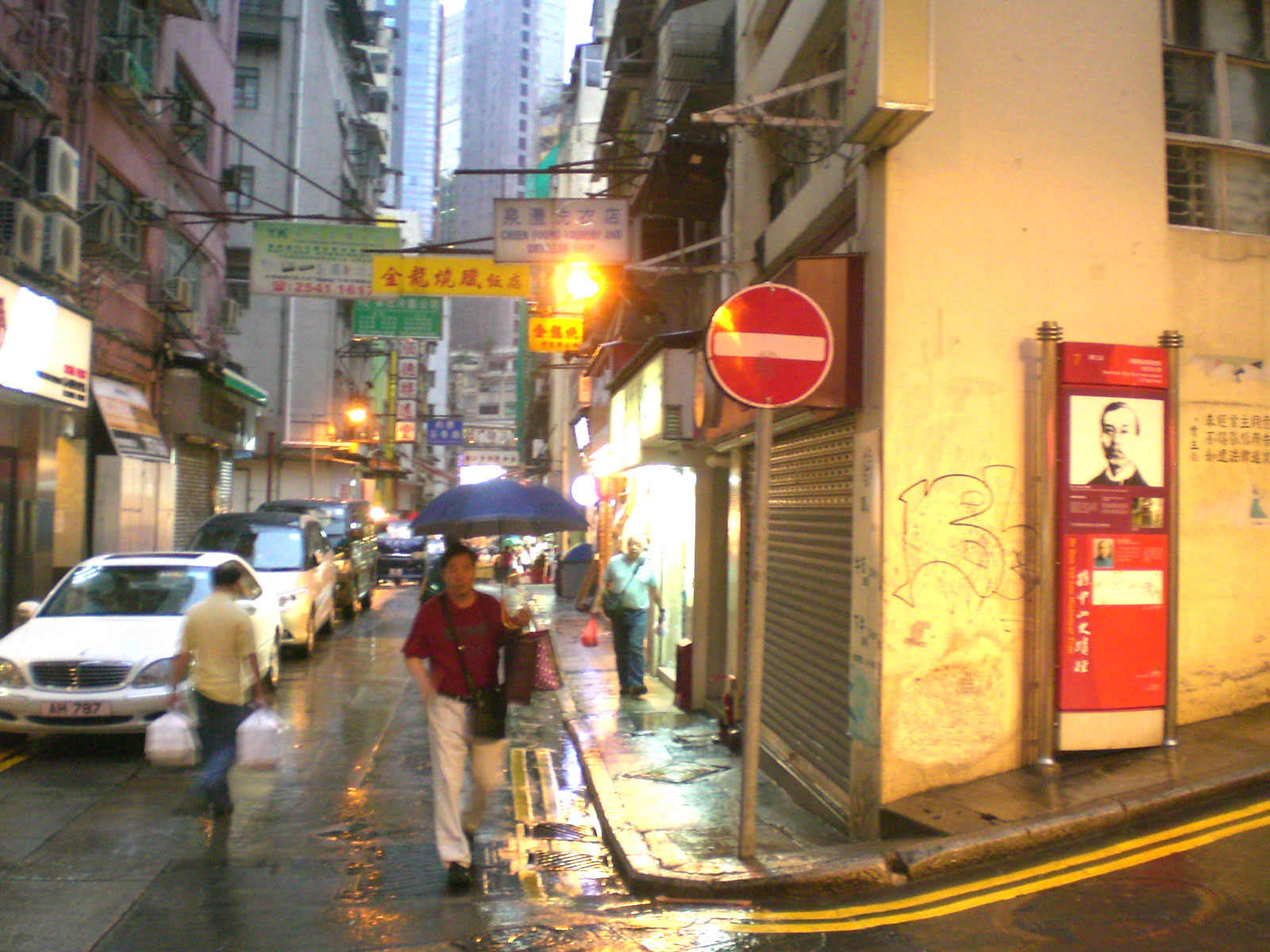
Gage Street, at its junction with Aberdeen Street. The red sign commemorates Yang Quyun.

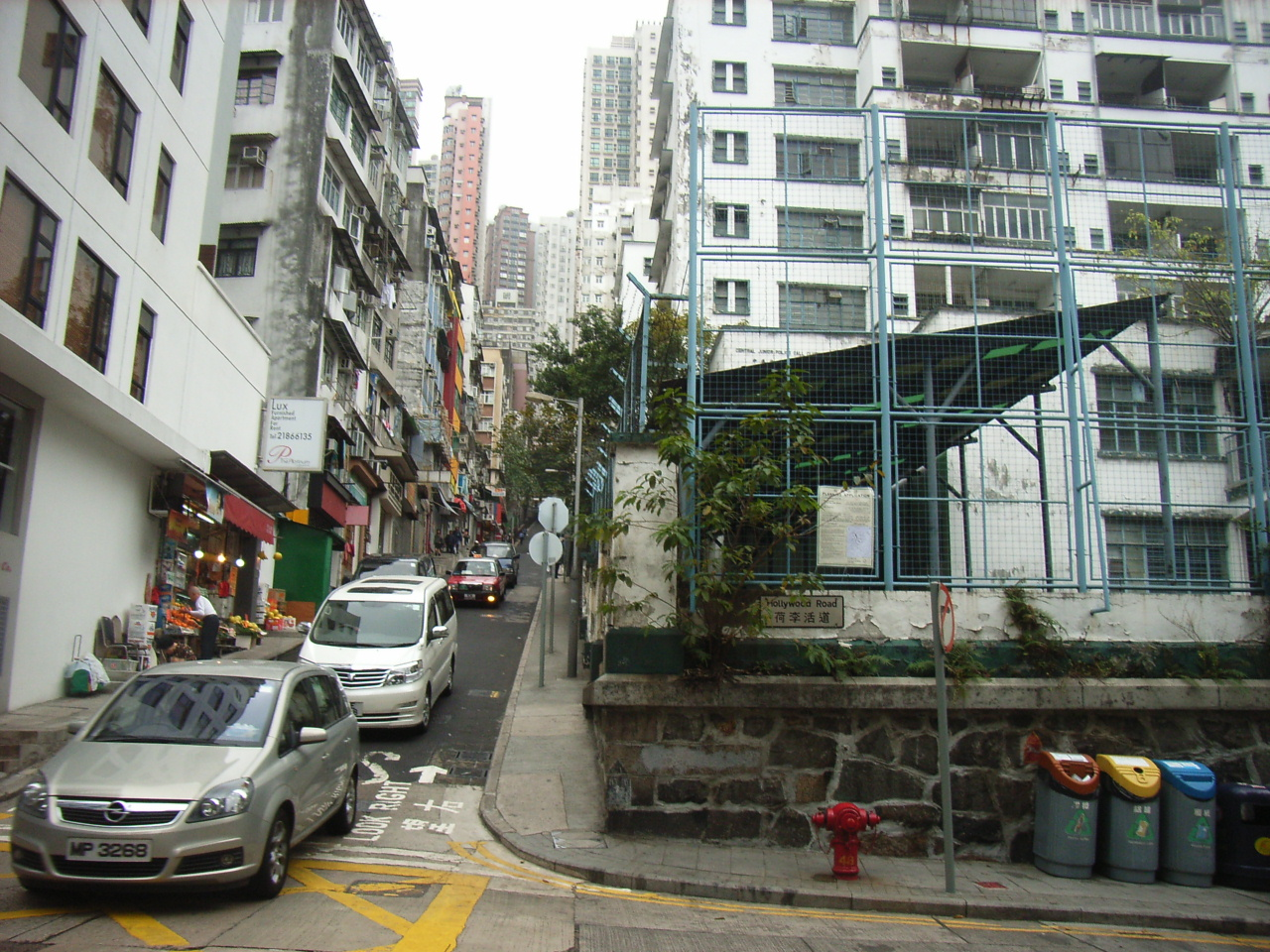
Former Hollywood Road Police Married Quarters at the corner of Hollywood Road and Aberdeen Street.

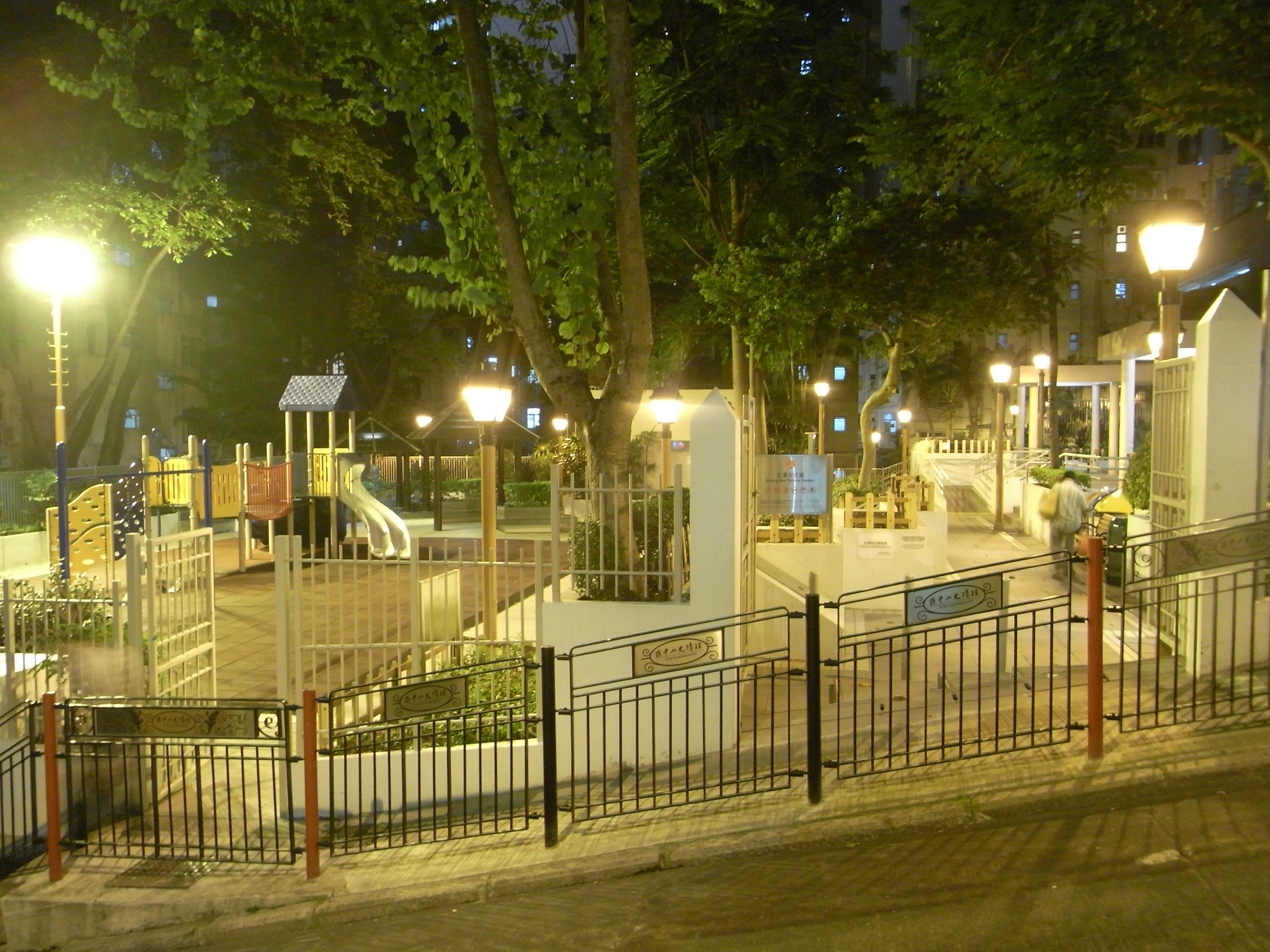
Kwong Hon Terrace Garden viewed from Aberdeen Street.

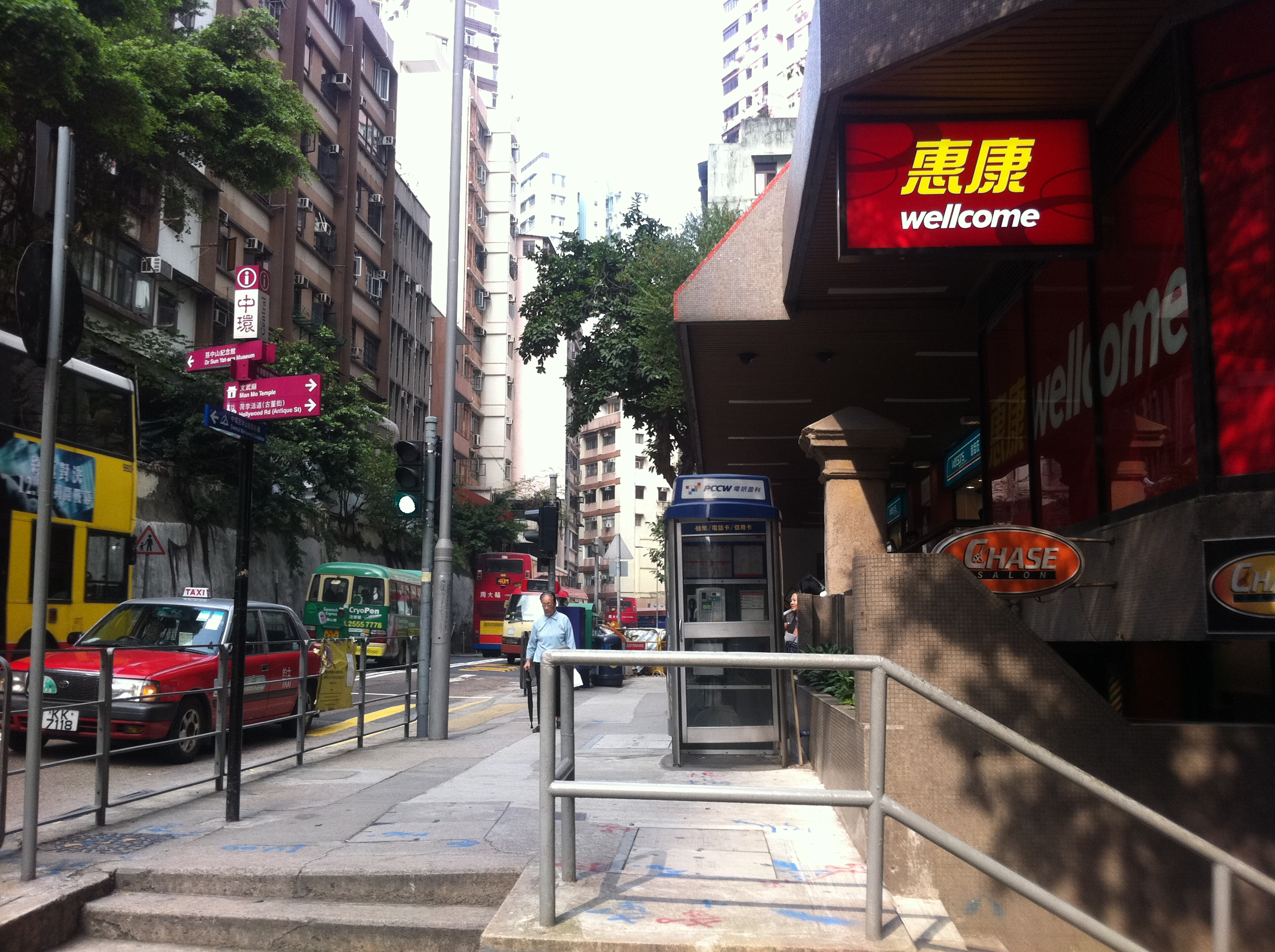
Caine Road at its junction with the upper end of Aberdeen Street. The building on the right is Albron Court.

Aberdeen Street (Chinese: 鴨巴甸街) is a border street dividing Sheung Wan and Central on Hong Kong Island, Hong Kong. It ascends from Queen's Road Central to Caine Road in Mid-Levels. The street is named after George Hamilton-Gordon, 4th Earl of Aberdeen, who was Foreign Secretary at the time of the cession of Hong Kong Island to the United Kingdom in 1842.

== History ==
In the early days after 1841, when Choong Wan was planned to be the business centre of Victoria City, and an area populated by Westerners, the native Chinese population was relocated from Choong Wan to the area around Tai Ping Shan Street in Sheung Wan.

After reclamation of land at the northern end of the island, Aberdeen Street was extended to Wing Kut Street (Chinese: 永吉街), a pedestrian zone which hosts a street market.

The Alice Memorial Hospital and the College of Medicine, where Sun Yat-sen graduated with distinction in 1892, were located near the junction of Hollywood Road with Aberdeen Street. After the college was merged into the University of Hong Kong, the hospital was moved to the university campus on Bonham Road, and renamed Nethersole Hospital.

== Features ==
The following list of streets and landmarks follows a north–south order. (W) indicates the western side of the street, while (E) indicates the eastern side.

- Junction with Queen's Road Central (this section is a ladder street)
- Intersection with Wellington Street
- (E) Lin Heung Tea House (Chinese: 蓮香樓; lit. 'Fragrant Lotus')
  - Located at 160–164 Wellington Street, at the corner with Aberdeen Street. The restaurant opened in 1928, and changed location several times before opening at its present location. It serves dim sum for breakfast and lunch, and traditional Cantonese dishes for dinner.
- (W) Junction with Kau U Fong (九如坊)
- (W) Lan Kwai Fong Hotel
  - Located at No. 3 Kau U Fong, at the corner with Aberdeen Street. Despite the name, it is not located in Lan Kwai Fong.
- (E) Junction with Wa on Lane (華安里)
- (W) Junction with Gough Street
- (E) Junction with Gage Street
- (E) Original site of the school where Yang Quyun was assassinated by Qing agents in 1911.
  - A sign commemorating Yang Quyun was formerly located at the corner of No. 52 Gage Street and Aberdeen Street, but has since been moved to the rear of the building on Sam Ka Lane. It forms part of the Dr Sun Yat-sen Historical Trail. The site is also included in the Central and Western Heritage Trail.
- (E) junction with Sam Ka Lane (三家里)
- Intersection with Hollywood Road
- (W) PMQ (前荷李活道已婚警察宿舍)
  - The compound occupies the block west of Aberdeen Street, between Hollywood Road and Staunton Street. It is located on the site of the former Central School. The school had been established in Gough Street in 1862, before moving to Aberdeen Street in 1889 when it was renamed Victoria College. At that time, the school was one of the largest and most expensive buildings in Hong Kong. It was renamed Queen's College in 1894. The campus was destroyed during World War II, and the school was subsequently relocated. The buildings in Aberdeen Street were demolished in 1948 and the Quarters were opened in 1951. They were completely vacated in 2000. It was revitalised as a creative hub for local design talents in 2014.
- Intersection with Staunton Street
- (E) Kwong Hon Terrace Garden (光漢臺花園)
- (W) Albron Court, at the corner with Caine Road
  - The current building occupies the site of a former two-storey mansion of the same name, which had been built in the 1870s for H.N. Mody. A gatepost of the mansion remains in front of the building on Caine Road.
- (E) St. Margaret's Girls' College, on the corner with Caine Road
- Intersection with Caine Road

== See also ==
- List of streets and roads in Hong Kong
