= Furen Literary Society =

Revolutionary group in British Hong Kong (1892-95)

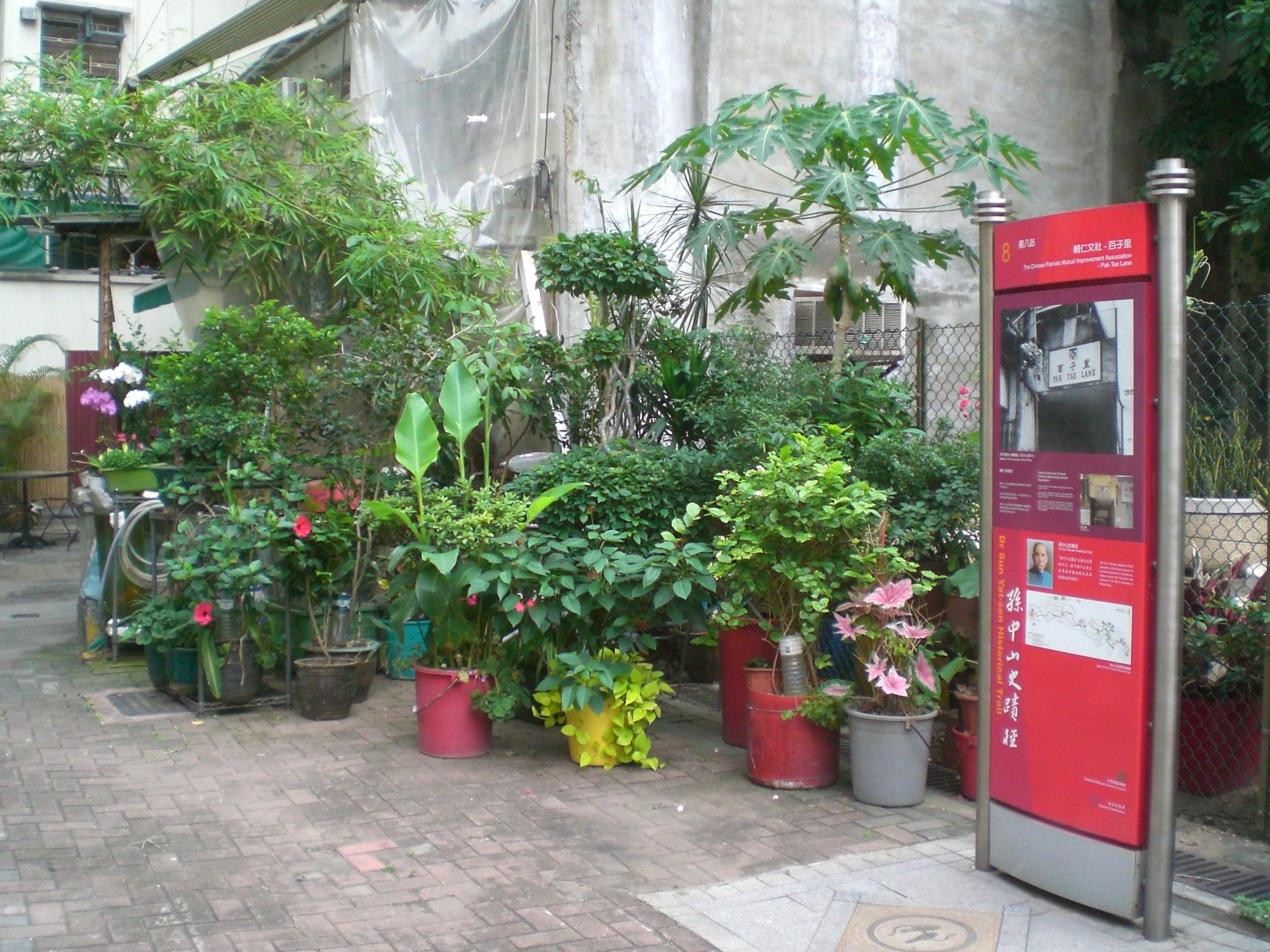
- Pak Tsz Lane, the original site of the Furen Literary Society, is now the 8th spot of the Dr Sun Yat-sen Historical Trail
- Traditional Chinese: 輔仁文社
Transcriptions
Standard Mandarin
- Hanyu Pinyin: Fǔ rén wén shè
Yue: Cantonese
- Yale Romanization: Fuh yàhn màhn séh
- Jyutping: Fu^{6} jan^{4} man^{4} se^{5}

The Furen Literary Society, also known as the Chinese Patriotic Mutual Improvement Association, or the 'Furen Cultural Society Restoration Association (Foo Yan Man Ser Kwong Fook Hui)', was founded in colonial Hong Kong in 1892.

It was founded by Yeung Ku-wan, together with Tse Tsan-tai and others, with Yeung as their leader. The guiding principles of the society were: "Open up the people's minds" (Chinese: 開通民智) and "Ducit Amor Patriae" (盡心愛國; 'Love your country with all your heart'). Other tenets were:

- To purify the character in the highest possible degree
- To prohibit indulgences in the vices of the world
- To set an example for future young Chinese
- To improve in all possible ways Chinese and foreign knowledge both in a civil and a military point of view
- To obtain a good knowledge of western science and learning: and
- To learn how to be and act as a patriot and how to wipe out the unjust wrong our country has suffered.

The society met in Pak Tsz Lane, Central, Hong Kong.

In November 1894, Sun Yat-sen founded the Revive China Society in Honolulu, Hawaii, and, in 1895, the Furen Literary Society was merged into the Hong Kong chapter of the Revive China Society, with help from Yau Lit. Yeung Kui-wan and Sun became respectively, President and Secretary of the Revive China Society.

A memorial park (Pak Tsz Lane Park) to the early revolutionists of the Furen Literary was opened in May, 2011 - just in time for the centenary anniversary of the Xinhai Revolution, which realised the dreams of the members of the Furen Literary Society.

== Members ==
The Society had 16 members, the details of whom 14 are known:

Member	From	Educated	Work	Note	Fate
* Yeung Ku-wan (楊衢雲)	Haicheng, Fujian; born in Fumen Walled City, Dongguan, Guangdong	St. Paul's College	teaching staff of St. Joseph's College, chief secretary of China Merchants' Steam Navigation Company, vice-manager of the Sassoon Maritime Company	leader of the Society, President of the Hong Kong chapter of Revive China Society	Assassinated 1901 by Qing agents
* Tse Tsan-tai (謝纘泰)	Hoiping, Guangdong, born in Sydney, Australia	Government Central School	secretary of Public Works Department, Hong Kong	Treasurer of Hong Kong Revive China Society	
* Chan Fan (陳芬)		Government Central School	interpreter for Hong Kong Government		
* Chow Chiu-ngok (周昭岳)	Namhoi, Guangdong	Government Central School	a businessman	member of the Hong Kong chapter of Revive China Society	
* Wong Kwok-yu (黃國瑜)	Namhoi, Guangdong	Government Central School	interpreter of Hong Kong Government		
* Law Man-yuk (羅文玉)	Shuntak, Guangdong	Government Central School	teaching staff of St. Joseph's College		
* Wen Tsung-yao (溫宗堯)	Sunning, Guangdong	Government Central School	teaching staff of the Government Central School	participated in the Independence Army uprising	Died 1947 in Nanjing jail
* Luk King-fo (陸敬科)	Shiuhing, Guangdong	The Government Central School	teaching staff of the Government Central School		
* Lau Yin-bun (劉燕賓)		St. Joseph's College	chief secretary of Ping Kee Shipping Company		
* Wu Gon-chi (胡幹之)	Punyü, Guangdong	St. Paul's College	comprador of the Sassoon Maritime Company		
* Ho Yu-minh (何汝明)	Heungshan, Guangdong	St. Paul's College	teaching staff of St. Paul's College		
* Wong Wing-seung (黃詠商)	Heungshan, Guangdong	St. Paul's College		President of Revive China Society	
* Yau Lit (尢列)	Shuntak, Guangdong	Canton Academy of Mathematics	secretary of Secretariat for Chinese Affairs (now the Home Affairs Bureau, Hong Kong)		
* Chan Wai-fan (陳鏸勳)	Namhoi, Guangdong			author of Hong Kong Collections (香港雜記)	

== See also ==
- Timeline of Late Anti-Qing Rebellions
