= Tse Tsan-tai =

Australian Chinese revolutionary (1872–1938)

- 謝纘泰
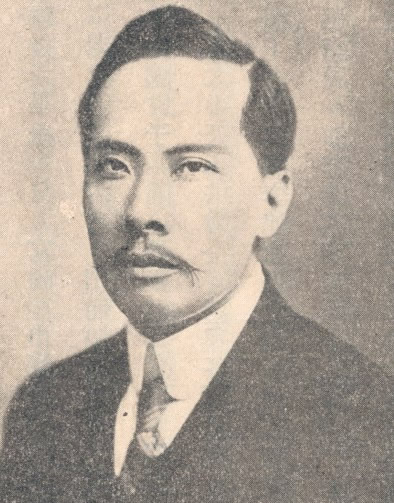
- Born: 16 May 1872; Grafton, New South Wales, Australia
- Died: 4 April 1938 (aged 65); British Hong Kong
- Occupations: South China Morning Post co-founder Government servant
- Era: Imperial China
- Known for: Anti-Qing Revolutionary; Author; Writer

Tse Tsan-tai (Chinese: 謝纘泰 or 謝贊泰; pinyin: Xiè Zàntài; Sidney Lau: Je^{6} Juen^{2} Taai^{3}; 16 May 1872 – 4 April 1938), courtesy name Sing-on (聖安), art-named Hong-yu (康如), was a Chinese Australian revolutionary, active during the late Qing dynasty. Tse had an interest in designing airships but none were ever constructed. His book The Chinese Republic: Secret History of the Revolution (中華民國革命秘史), published in 1924 by the South China Morning Post, of which he was co-founder, is an important source of studies on the anti-Qing revolution. He is also the founder of the Chinese Club.

== Early life ==
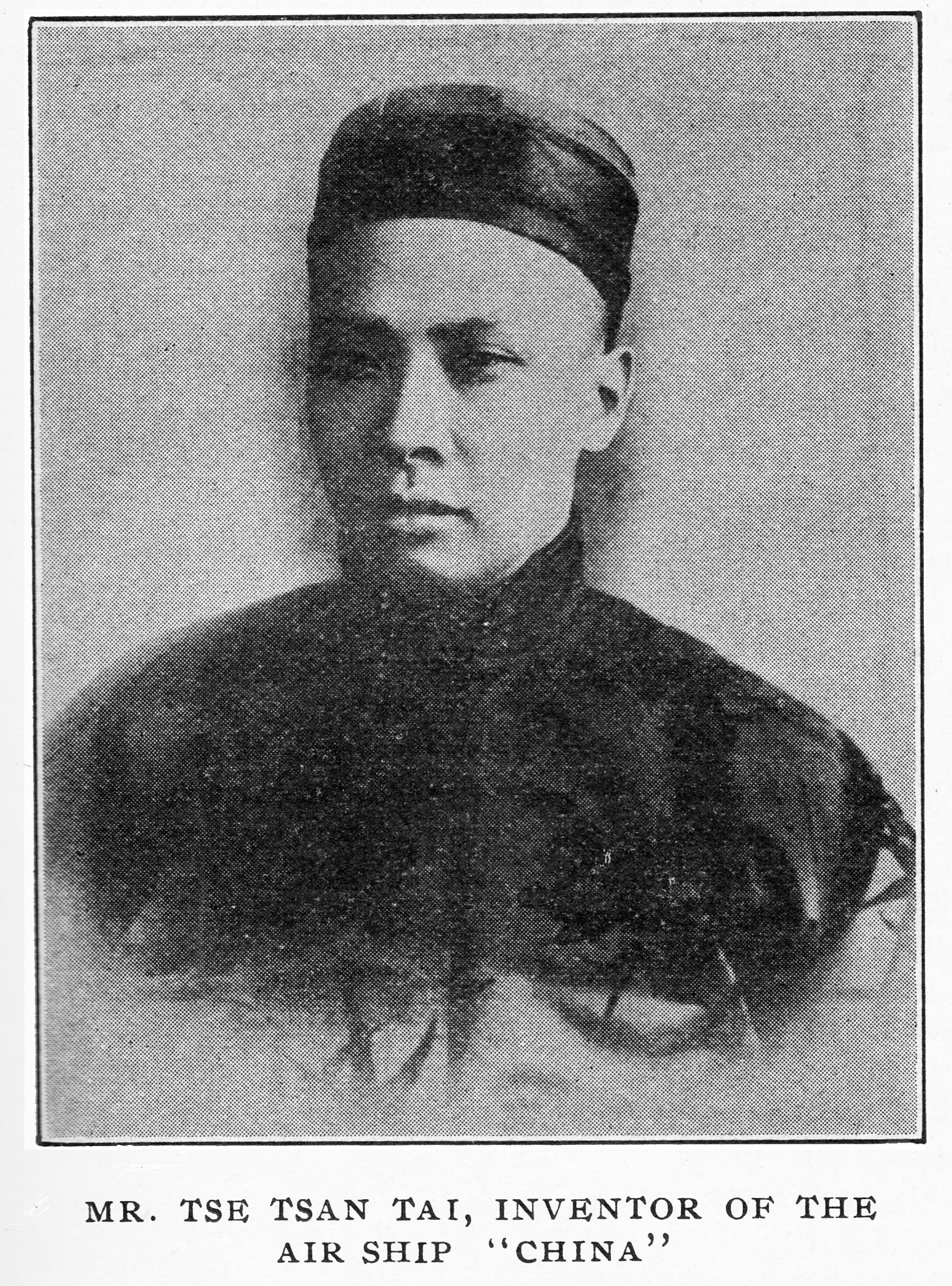
Portrait of Tse Tsan-tai c. 1907

Born in Grafton, New South Wales, to Tse Yat-cheong (謝日昌) who was a Chinese nationalist, Tse Tsan-tai was baptised "James See" on 1 November 1879. His family was on close terms with the family of Vivian Chow Yung, another prominent Chinese-Australian from Grafton. In 1887, Tse moved to Hong Kong with his family and he was educated at The Government Central School (now the Queen's College). Afterwards Tse worked as a secretary in the Public Works Department of the Government of Hong Kong for nearly 10 years.

== Interest in airships ==
Tse claimed to have invented and designed the world's first steerable airship in 1894 which he named "CHINA". After he had perfected his design, in 1899 he wrote to Hiram S. Maxim of the then recently merged Vickers & Maxim Company which had also started building airships. He provided drawings and explanations about how his design would enable airships to be steered by propellers and that the balloon, "cigar-shaped", would be enclosed in an aluminum shell, thus "protecting it from enemy missiles".

Maxim responded to Tse that he was already in possession of Tse's "secrets". The 'secrets' Maxim referred to were, coincidentally, revealed that same year with the launching in Germany of Count Zeppelin's first giant rigid airship. Zeppelin's progress was already more advanced than Tse, having first started planning these ships as early as 1874. He patented the design in 1895, long before Tse had started his own designs.

== As an anti-Qing dynasty revolutionary ==
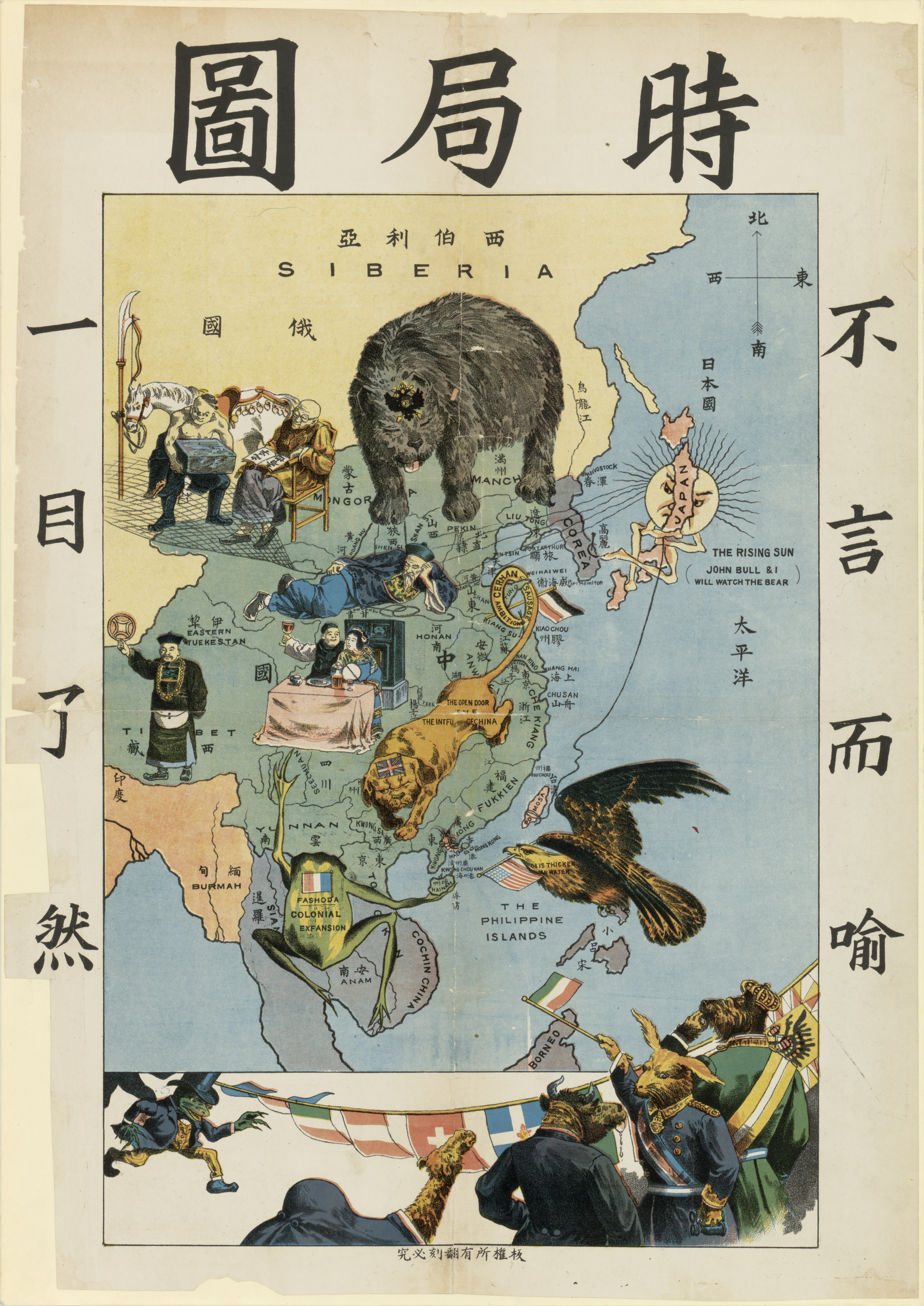
The Situation in the Far East (1899)

On 13 March 1892, Tse, together with Yeung Ku-wan and others, started the Furen Literary Society in Pak Tse Lane, Sheung Wan, with the guiding principle of "Ducit Amor Patriae" (盡心愛國 in Chinese, literally "Love your country with all your heart"). The Furen Literary Society was merged into the Hong Kong Chapter of the Revive China Society in 1895, with Yeung and Sun Yat-sen as the president and secretary of the society respectively. When Yeung and Sun fled overseas after the unsuccessful First Guangzhou Uprising, Tse remained in Hong Kong.

As a newspaper person, Tse wrote the first declaration of the Revive China Society, with an open letter to the Guangxu Emperor in English. He also published The Situation in the Far East (時局全圖) to warn patriots against the Western powers' ambition to partition China. In November 1903, Tse co-founded the South China Morning Post with Alfred Cunningham.

Tse was also a Christian, and published a book entitled The Creation, the Garden of Eden and the Origin of the Chinese in 1914. In it, he argued that the Garden of Eden was located in modern-day Xinjiang and that many Biblical events and narratives occurred within China's vicinity. The book even claims that Abraham was descended from legendary Chinese emperors like Shennong, whom he identifies with Shem, and that Shem's descendant Uz, best known for being the ancestor of Job, is the ancestor of the indigenous peoples of the Americas.

== After the revolution ==
After the Xinhai Revolution in 1911, Tse was not involved in the Republic of China Government. He died on 4 April 1938 and was buried in Hong Kong.

== Literature ==
Wang, Dong. Tse Tsan Tai (1872-1938): An Australian-Cantonese Opinion Maker in British Hong Kong. Lived Places Publishing, New York 2023. ISBN 9781915271846
