= Revive China Society =

Chinese association established in 1894

- 興中會
- The Hsing Chung Hui (Blue Sky, White Sun) flag was designed by Lu Haodong and is currently the Kuomintang flag.
- Merged into: Tongmenghui
- Successor: Kuomintang
- Formation: 24 November 1894; 131 years ago
- Founder: Sun Yat-sen
- Founded at: Honolulu, Republic of Hawaii
- Dissolved: 20 August 1905; 121 years ago
- Type: Secret political fraternity
- Headquarters: 13 Staunton Street, Hong Kong
- Leader: Yeung Ku-wan
- Affiliations: Revive Han Association

Revive China Society
- Traditional Chinese: 興中會
- Simplified Chinese: 兴中会
Transcriptions
Standard Mandarin
- Hanyu Pinyin: Xīngzhōnghuì
- Bopomofo: ㄒㄧㄥ ㄓㄨㄥ ㄏㄨㄟˋ
- Wade–Giles: Hsing^{1}-chung^{1}-hui^{4}
- Tongyong Pinyin: Sing-jhong-huèi
- IPA: [ɕíŋ.ʈʂʊ́ŋ.xwêɪ]
Yue: Cantonese
- Yale Romanization: Hīng-jūng-wuih
- Jyutping: hing1 zung1 wui6
- IPA: [hɪŋ˥ tsʊŋ˥ wuj˨]

The Revive China Society (traditional Chinese: 興中會; simplified Chinese: 兴中会; pinyin: Xīngzhōnghuì), also known as the Society for Regenerating China or the Proper China Society was founded by Sun Yat-sen on 24 November 1894 to forward the goal of establishing prosperity for China and as a platform for future revolutionary activities, as well as the first major modern revolutionary group in Chinese history. It was formed during the First Sino-Japanese War, after a string of Chinese military defeats exposed corruption and incompetence within the imperial government of the Qing dynasty.

The Revive China Society went through several political re-organizations in later years and eventually became the party known as the Kuomintang. As such, the contemporary Kuomintang considers its founding date to be the establishment of the Revive China Society.

== Development and Decline ==
Because Sun was in exile from China at the time, the Revive China Society was founded in Honolulu, Republic of Hawaii. It was the first Chinese nationalist revolutionary society. Those admitted to the society swore the following oath:

Expel Tatar barbarians, revive Zhonghua, and establish a unified government.
(驅除韃虜，恢復中華，創立合眾政府。)

The first member of the society was Deng Yinnan, a friend of Sun Yat-sen, and attended its founding meeting. The oath itself was established when the society was seemingly agricultural in nature. When Sun Yat-sen returned to Hong Kong in early 1895, he met up again with Yeung Ku-wan, president of the already existing Furen Literary Society, whom he had first met in 1891. As they both wanted to take advantage of the uneasy political situation due to the First Sino-Japanese War, on 18 February 1895 the Furen Literary Society was merged into the Revive China Society, with help from Yau Lit, a close friend of Sun and member of Furen. Yeung and Sun became the President and Secretary of the Society respectively. They disguised their activities in Hong Kong at 13 Staunton Street under the guise of running a business called "Kuen Hang Club" (乾亨行).

In October 1895, the Revive China Society planned to launch an uprising in Guangzhou, with Yeung directing the uprising in Hong Kong where funds and training location were provided by Li Ki-tong. However, plans were leaked out and more than 70 members, including Lu Haodong, a schoolboy friend of Sun Yat-sen, were captured by the Qing government. Prior to the capture, Yeung Ku-wan was elected president (or general manager) of the 'United Government,' which would have been put in power given the uprising managed to overthrow the Qing monarchy, with Sun Yat-sen as the secretary.

Under pressure from the Qing government in China, the British Hong Kong government forced Yeung and Sun Yat-sen to leave, barring them from entering Hong Kong over the next five years. During this time, a branch was formed of the society in Taiwan, in early November, though they failed to garner many members, while another was formed in the Chinatown of San Francisco, with similar amounts of success. Yeung travelled to Johannesburg, South Africa, via Singapore to Chinese laborers and later to Japan, where he stayed from 1896 to 1899, to expand the Revive China Society and spread its ideas. In the summer of 1898, he met with Mariano Ponce, who was working toward the independence of the Philippines, and he expressed support for their cause.

Throughout this time, on numerous occasions did the society attempt to instigate an uprising in China, one prominent example being in the Spring and Summer of 1899, where the society attempted to incite a rebellion in Guangdong, Hunan and Hubei, where he made friends with Zhang Binglin, and smuggled guns to Ponce's army in the Philippines, however, no uprising materialized, as his allies in Yokohama, where Sun Yat-sen had stayed and begun promoting his ideas, all were too disorganized. In the following year, the newspaper of the society, China Daily, was established, and Yat-sen began desperately working with the Guangdong Triads, as the organization began the slow process of fizzling out.

Sun Yat-sen attempted to revitalize the organization, taking trips back to Hawaii, and then to the United States, but failed to garner attention, and stayed in such conditions until it merged with the Tongmenghui and became the Kuomintang.

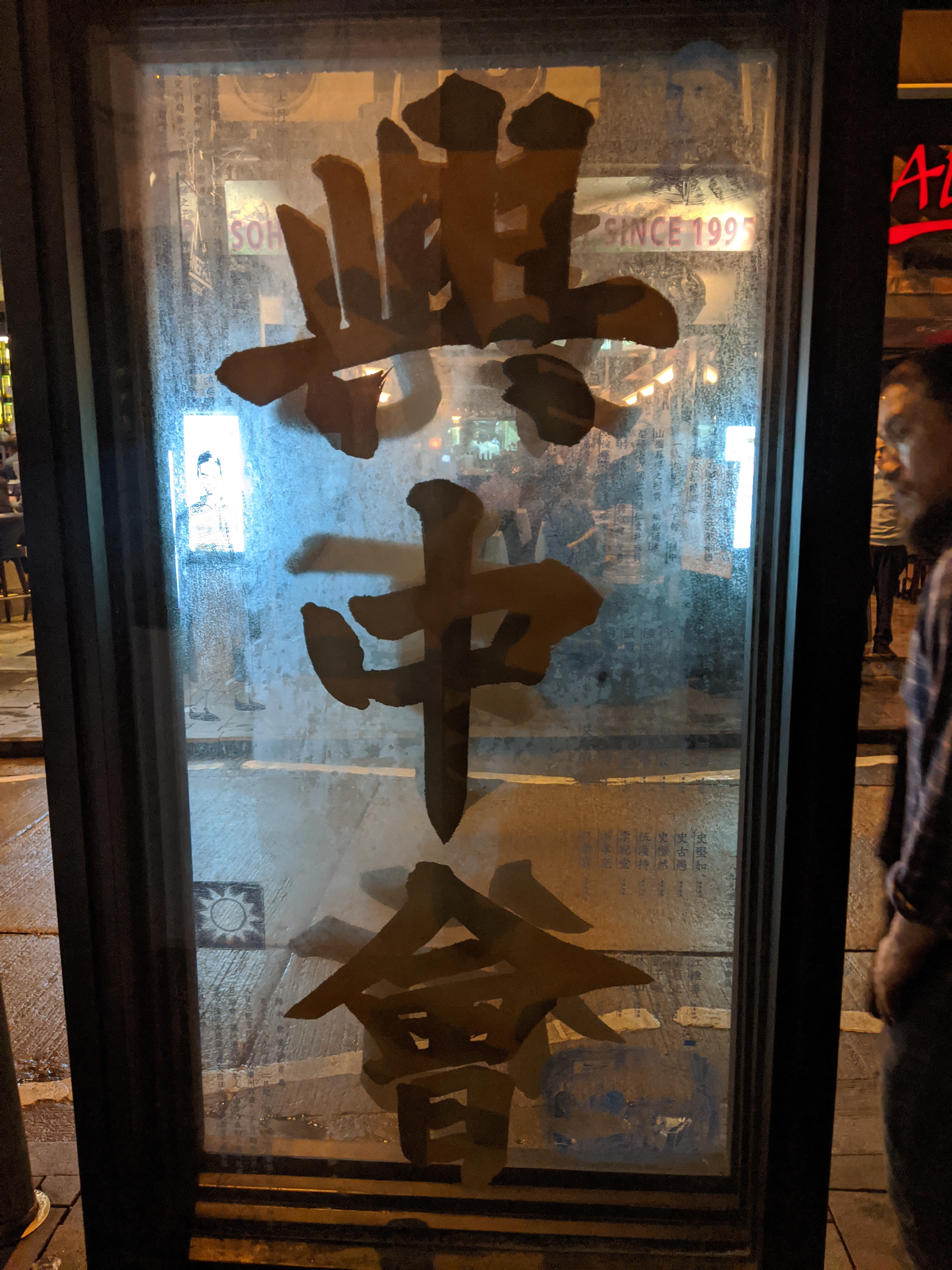
Marker in front of 13 Staunton Street along the Dr Sun Yat-sen Historical Trail in Hong Kong

== See also ==
- Tongmenghui
- Kuomintang
- History of the Republic of China
- Huaxinghui
