= List of knights and dames commander of the Order of the British Empire appointed in 1917 and 1918 =

The Order of the British Empire is a British order of chivalry. Established on 4 June 1917 to recognise civilian contributions to the British war effort during the First World War, it was expanded to include a military division at the end of 1918. While continuing to recognise achievement and service in the military, it has since become the main state honour for recognising achievements in public life in the United Kingdom. The order has had five grades since its inception. The top two, Knight or Dame Grand Cross (the most senior) and Knight or Dame Commander, confer the style of knighthood (for men) or damehood (for women) upon the recipient. The following is a list of knights and dames commander appointed from the order's inception to the end of 1918; at least 220 people were given the honour in this period, virtually all for services relating to the war effort.

== List of knights and dames commander of the Order of the British Empire ==
Date	Name	Notes	Ref.
4 June 1917	Edith Vane-Tempest-Stewart, Marchioness of Londonderry	Founder of the Women's Legion. "For Services in connection with the War".	
4 June 1917	Hariot Georgina Hamilton-Temple-Blackwood, Dowager Marchioness of Dufferin and Ava, CI	"For Services in connection with the War".	
4 June 1917	Fanny Lucy Byron, Baroness Byron	For Services in connection with the War.	
4 June 1917	Hon. Edith Sophy Lyttelton	War Refugees Committee. "For Services in connection with the War".	
4 June 1917	Sarah Anne Lees	Formerly Mayor and Alderman of the Borough Council of Oldham. "For Services in connection with the War".	
4 June 1917	Rt Hon. Sir Ailwyn Edward Fellowes, KCVO	Chairman, Board of Agriculture Consultative Committee. "For Services in connection with the War".	
4 June 1917	Rt Hon. Donald Maclean, MP	Chairman, London Tribunal. "For Services in connection with the War".	
4 June 1917	Hon. William Henry Goschen	Chairman, King George V Hospital; Deputy Chairman, Joint Finance Committee British Red Cross Society and Order of St John of Jerusalem. "For Services in connection with the War".	
4 June 1917	Sir Richard Frederick Crawford, KCMG	Commercial Adviser to the Embassy at Washington. "For Services in connection with the War".	
4 June 1917	Major Sir Thomas Bilbe Robinson, KCMG	Agent-General for Queensland, Director of Meat Supplies for Allied Forces, Board of Trade. "For Services in connection with the War".	
4 June 1917	Sir Edward Tyas Cook	Joint Director of the Official Press Bureau. "For Services in connection with the War".	
4 June 1917	Sir Thomas Munro	Director of Women's Wages Section, Ministry of Labour. "For Services in connection with the War".	
4 June 1917	Sir Douglas William Owen	Chairman of Advisory Committee, War Risks Insurance Office, Chairman Coal Exports Committee. "For Services in connection with the War".	
4 June 1917	Sir Vincent Litchfield Raven	Deputy Controller, Admiralty. "For Services in connection with the War".	
4 June 1917	Alan Garrett Anderson	Controller, Admiralty, lately Vice-Chairman of the Wheat Commission, Board of Trade. "For Services in connection with the War".	
4 June 1917	Herbert Austin	"For Services in connection with the War".	
4 June 1917	Captain Charles Bathurst, MP	Formerly Parliamentary Secretary, Ministry of Food. "For Services in connection with the War".	
4 June 1917	Thomas Bell	Deputy Controller for Dockyards and Shipping. "For Services in connection with the War".	
4 June 1917	George John Carter	"For Services in connection with the War".	
4 June 1917	Dugald Clerk	Member of the Panel of Board of Invention and Research, Admiralty; Member of the Ministry of Munitions Inventions Department; Member of the Trench Warfare Advisory Panel. "For Services in connection with the War".	
4 June 1917	Charles John Cleland	Acting chairman, Glasgow Local Committee on Naval and Military War Pensions. "For Services in connection with the War".	
4 June 1917	Brien Ibrican Cokayne	Deputy Governor of the Bank of England. "For Services in connection with the War".	
4 June 1917	William Collingwood	Chairman, Cooperative Board of Management, Manchester and District Armaments Output Committee. "For Services in connection with the War".	
4 June 1917	Charles William Fielding	Chairman of the Pyrites Sub-Committee of the Explosives Supply Department, and Chairman of the Materials and Metals Economy Committee, Ministry of Munitions. "For Services in connection with the War".	
4 June 1917	John Ritchie Findlay	Member of the Scottish Advisory Committee, National Relief Fund. "For Services in connection with the War".	
4 June 1917	Charles Blair Gordon	Representative of the Ministry of Munitions in the United States of America. "For Services in connection with the War".	
4 June 1917	Henry Percy Harris, MP	Chairman of the London War Pensions Committee. "For Services in connection with the War".	
4 June 1917	Alfred Edward Herbert	Deputy Director-General in charge of the Machine Tool Division and Chairman of the Machine Tool Committee, Ministry of Munitions. "For Services in connection with the War".	
4 June 1917	John Hunter	Director of Factory Construction and Director of Iron and Steel Production, Ministry of Munitions. "For Services in connection with the War".	
4 June 1917	John Hannell Irvin	Formerly Adviser to the Board of Trade on Fish and Food Supplies. "For Services in connection with the War".	
4 June 1917	Cyril Jackson	Vice-Chairman, War Pensions Statutory Committee. "For Services in connection with the War".	
4 June 1917	Professor Herbert S. Jackson, FRS	Chemical Adviser to the Optical Research Branch of the Ministry of Munitions. "For Services in connection with the War".	
4 June 1917	Robert Molesworth Kindersley	Chairman, National War Savings Committee. "For Services in connection with the War".	
4 June 1917	Leonard Wilkinson Llewelyn	Director of Materials and Deputy Director-General in the Department of Munitions Supply. "For Services in connection with the War".	
4 June 1917	Lynden Macassey, KC	Director of Shipyards Labour, Ministry of Munitions. "For Services in connection with the War".	
4 June 1917	Herbert Edward Morgan	Honorary Assistant to Director, Employment Exchanges, Ministry of Labour. "For Services in connection with the War".	
4 June 1917	Cecil Partridge	Manager and Secretary, Metropolitan Munitions Committee. "For Services in connection with the War".	
4 June 1917	Ernest Murray Pollock, KC, MP	Controller of the Foreign Trade Department, Foreign Office. "For Services in connection with the War".	
4 June 1917	Thomas Robinson	Adviser to the Board of Agriculture, Fish Food Committee. "For Services in connection with the War".	
4 June 1917	Arthur Roberts	Assistant Director-General, Royal Army Clothing Department. "For Services in connection with the War".	
4 June 1917	Edmund Robbins	Secretary of Admiralty and War Office Press Committee. "For Services in connection with the War".	
4 June 1917	John Smith Samuel	For Services in connection with the War.	
4 June 1917	Honorary Lieutenant-Colonel Edward Stewart	Medical Assessor to the British Red Cross Society and Order of St John of Jerusalem in France. "For Services in connection with the War".	
4 June 1917	Frederick Wilfred Scott Stokes	Chairman of East Anglian Munitions Committee. "For Services in connection with the War".	
4 June 1917	Richard Threlfall, FRS	Member of the Advisory Council of Industrial and Scientific Research. "For Services in connection with the War".	
4 June 1917	Honorary Colonel Johnstone Wallace	For Services in connection with the War.	
4 June 1917	W. Walton	Vice-President, Admiralty Transport Arbitration Board. "For Services in connection with the War".	
4 June 1917	Arthur Keysall Yapp	National Secretary, Young Men's Christian Association. "For Services in connection with the War".	
4 December 1917	His Highness Raja Sir Udaji Rao Puar, KCSI, of Dhar	"For services in connection with the war".	
4 December 1917	Sir John Prescott Hewett, GCSI, CIE	Chairman of the Indian Soldiers Fund Committee. "For services in connection with the war"	
4 December 1917	Sir Charles Raitt Cleveland, KCIE	Director of Criminal Intelligence, Indian Civil Service. "For services in connection with the war".	
4 December 1917	Marjorie Adeline, Baroness Pentland	"For services in connection with the war".	
4 December 1917	Marie Adelaide, Baroness Willingdon, CI	"For services in connection with the war".	
1 January 1918	Francis Arthur Aglen	Inspector-General of the Chinese Maritime Customs.	
1 January 1918	Frank Baillie	Director of National Aeroplane Factory, Toronto.	
1 January 1918	Clement Anderson Montague Barlow, MP, LLD.		
1 January 1918	John Field Beale	Vice-Chairman, Royal Commission on Wheat Supplies; Chairman of Allied Wheat Executive.	
1 January 1918	Colonel Sir George Thomas Beatson, KCB, MD, DL, VD	Chairman, Scottish Branch, British Red Cross Society.	
1 January 1918	Walter Becker		
1 January 1918	Andrew Caird	Administrator, New York Headquarters of the British War Mission to the United States of America.	
1 January 1918	James Cantlie, MB, FRCS	Member of Council and of Executive Committee, British Red Cross Society.	
1 January 1918	Colonel Charles Frederick Close, CB, CMG	Director-General of the Ordnance Survey of the United Kingdom.	
1 January 1918	Alfred Thomas Davies, CB	Founder and Honorary Director of the British Prisoners of War Book Scheme.	
1 January 1918	Joseph Davies	Representative for Wales and Monmouthshire of the Cabinet Committee for Prevention of Unemployment and Distress.	
1 January 1918	William Henry Davison		
1 January 1918	Alfred Hull Dennis, CB	Assistant Treasury Solicitor.	
1 January 1918	The Right Honourable Willoughby Hyett Dickinson, MP	Chairman of the Soldiers' Dependants Assessment Appeals Committee.	
1 January 1918	William Don	Lord Provost of Dundee.	
1 January 1918	Arthur John Dorman	Chairman of Messrs Dorman, Long and Co., of Middlesbrough.	
1 January 1918	Bignell George Elliott		
1 January 1918	Herbert Trustram Eve	Chairman of the Forage Committee.	
1 January 1918	Walter Morley Fletcher, MD, DSc, FRS	Secretary of the Medical Research Committee.	
1 January 1918	Sir William Bower Forwood		
1 January 1918	Lieutenant-Colonel Henry Fowler, CBE	Chief Mechanical Engineer to the Midland Railway; Superintendent of the Royal Airicraft Factory, Farnborough.	
1 January 1918	James Galloway, CB	Chief Commissioner for Medical Services, Ministry of National Service.	
1 January 1918	Colonel Alexander Gibb, RE.	Of the firm of Messrs. Easton, Gibb and Son.	
1 January 1918	Kenneth Weldon Goadby, MRCS, LRCP	Member of the War Office Committee for the Study of Tetanus.	
1 January 1918	Arthur Home Goldfinch	Director of Raw Materials, Department of the Surveyor-General of Supply, War Office.	
1 January 1918	William Athelstane Meredith Goode	Honorary Secretary of the National Committee for Relief in Belgium.	
1 January 1918	Alexander Gracie, MVO	Managing Director of the Fairfield Shipbuilding and Engineering Company, Ltd.	
1 January 1918	Sir William Grey-Wilson, KCMG	Chairman of the Central Committee for Patriotic Organisations.	
1 January 1918	Connop Guthrie	Representative of the director of transports in the United States of America.	
1 January 1918	Lieutenant-Colonel Frederick Hall, MP		
1 January 1918	Arthur Ambrose Hall Harris	Acting director of Overseas Transport to the Canadian Government; Representative of the director of transports in Canada.	
1 January 1918	Frederick Ness Henderson	Member of the Admiralty Shipbuilding Council.	
1 January 1918	Philip Gutterez Henriques	Deputy Controller of Munitions Finance.	
1 January 1918	Ernest Varvill Hiley	Late Deputy Director of the National Service Department.	
1 January 1918	Colonel Arthur Richard Holbrook, VD, DL, JP		
1 January 1918	Lieutenant-Colonel Robert Stevenson Home, KC, RE	Director of Materials and Priority, Controller's Department, Admiralty	
1 January 1918	George Burton Hunter, DSc	Chairman of Messrs. Swan, Hunter & Wigham Richardson & Company, Ltd., Newcasfie-on-Tyne.	
1 January 1918	Brigadier-General Louis Charles Jackson, CB, CMG	Late Controller of the Trench Warfare Research Department, Ministry of Munitions.	
1 January 1918	Gustave Jarmay	Managing Director of Messrs. Brunner, Mond & Company Ltd.	
1 January 1918	Edgar Rees Jones, MP	Superintendent, Priority Department, Ministry of Munitions.	
1 January 1918	Roderick Jones	Managing Director, Reuter's Telegram Company, Limited.	
1 January 1918	Charles Halestaff Kenderdine	Honorary Secretary and Treasurer, Queen Mary's Convalescent Auxiliary Hospitals, Roehampton.	
1 January 1918	Harry Livesey	Director of Navy Contracts, Admiralty; formerly Deputy Director of Inland Water Transport and Docks, War Office.	
1 January 1918	John Seymour Lloyd, CMG	Director General of Recruiting.	
1 January 1918	John Mann	Controller of Contracts, Ministry of Munitions.	
1 January 1918	Arthur Harold Marshall, MP	Chairman of the Central Building Board of the Parliamentary Munitions Committee, and of the Parliamentary Recruiting Committee.	
1 January 1918	George Ernest May	Secretary to the Prudential Assurance Company; Manager of the American Dollar Securities Committee.	
1 January 1918	Peter Hannay McClelland	Member of Advisory Board, Surveyor General of Supply Department, War Office.	
1 January 1918	James McKechnie	Managing Director of Messrs Vickers, Ltd, Barrow.	
1 January 1918	Colonel Andrew Muter John Ogilvie, CB, RE	Director of Army Signals (Home Defence); Second Secretary to the Post Office.	
1 January 1918	Thomas Henry Penson	Chairman of the War Trade Intelligence Department.	
1 January 1918	Edward Penton Jnr	In charge of Boot Section, Royal Army Clothing Department.	
1 January 1918	Frederick George Panizzi Preston	Chairman of Messrs J. Stone & Company, Ltd, Deptford.	
1 January 1918	Sir Frederick Alexander Robertson	Chairman of the Central Council of United Alien Relief Societies.	
1 January 1918	Robert Robertson, DSc, FRS	Superintending Chemist, Research Department, Woolwich Arsenal.	
1 January 1918	Herbert Babington Rowell	Member of the Admiralty Shipbuilding Council.	
1 January 1918	Harry Smith	Chairman of the Keighley Board of Management, Ministry of Munitions.	
1 January 1918	Charles John Stewart	Public Trustee.	
1 January 1918	Thomas James Storey	Member of the Committee and Chairman of the Classification Committed of Lloyd's Register of Shipping.	
1 January 1918	Percy Kendall Stothert	Chairman of the West of England Board of Management, Ministry of Munitions.	
1 January 1918	The Right Honourable Sir Thomas Vezey Strong, KCVO	Chairman, City of London Tribunal.	
1 January 1918	Lieutenant-Colonel Campbell Stuart	Vice-Chairman of London Headquarters of British Mission to the United States of America.	
1 January 1918	Charles Sykes	Director of Wool Textile Production and Chairman of the Board of Control of the Worsted Woollen Trades.	
1 January 1918	William Henry Thompson, MD, MCh, DSc	Scientific Adviser to the Ministry of Food.	
1 January 1918	William Rowan Thomson	Director of Auxiliary Ships' Engines, Controller's Department, Admiralty.	
1 January 1918	Frank Warner	President of the Silk Association.	
1 January 1918	Lieutenant-Colonel Alfred Cholmeley Earle Welby	Secretary of the Royal Patriotic Fund Corporation.	
1 January 1918	Major (temporary Major-General) Lee Oliver FitzMaurice Stack, CMG	Acting Sirdar and Governor-General of the Soudan.	
1 January 1918	The Honourable Eva Isabella Henrietta Anstruther	Organiser of Soldiers' Libraries.	
1 January 1918	Caroline, Lady Arnott	Vice-President, Soldiers' and Sailors' Help Society, Dublin.	
1 January 1918	Maud Burnett	Town Councillor of Tynemouth.	
1 January 1918	Alice May Godman		
1 January 1918	Agnes Lowndes, Lady Jekyll	Head of Stores Department, Order of St. John of Jerusalem.	
1 January 1918	Adelaide Livingstone	Secretary of the Government Committee on the Treatment by the Enemy of British Prisoners of War	
1 January 1918	Ethel Locke-King	Vice-President of North Surrey Division and Assistant County Director, Surrey, British Red Gross and Order of St John of Jerusalem	
1 January 1918	Flora, Lady Lugard	Joint Founder of the War Refugees Committee, and Founder of the Lady Lugard Hospitality Committee	
1 January 1918	Margaret Ker Pryse-Rice	President, Carmarthenshire Branch of the British Red Cross Society	
1 January 1918	Rosamond Cornelia Gwladys, Viscountess Ridley	Donor and Administrator, Lady Ridley's Hospital for Officers	
1 January 1918	Edith Harriet, Lady Sclater	President of Lady Sclater's Work Room and Smokes Fund.	
1 January 1918	Olive Crofton, Lady Smith-Dorrien	President of the Hospital Bag Fund.	
1 January 1918	Janet Stancomb-Wills		
1 January 1918	Mary Louise Webster	Chairman of the British Women's Hospitals Committee; Chairman of the Three Arts Women's Employment Fund.	
1 January 1918	James William Barrett, CMG, MD	"For services in connection with the Australian Branch of the British Red Cross Society in Egypt, etc." and "in or for the Overseas Dominions, Colonies and Protectorates, in connection with the War."	
1 January 1918	Rear-Admiral William Clarkson, CMG, RAN	"For services in connection with the control and reorganisation of coastal shipping" and "in or for the Overseas Dominions, Colonies and Protectorates, in connection with the War."	
1 January 1918	Edward Owen Cox	Chairman, Overseas Shipping Committee. "For services in or for the Overseas Dominions, Colonies and Protectorates, in connection with the War."	
1 January 1918	Lieutenant-Colonel George Steward	"For services to the Commonwealth Government" and "in or for the Overseas Dominions, Colonies and Protectorates, in connection with the War."	
1 January 1918	Nellie Melba	"For services in organising patriotic work" and "in or for the Overseas Dominions, Colonies and Protectorates, in connection with the War."	
1 January 1918	Sir William Lee Plunket, 5th Baron Plunket, GCMG, KCVO	"For services in connection with the New Zealand War Contingent Association."	
1 January 1918	The Honourable Patrick Thomas McGrath, LLD	President of the Legislative Council; Food Controller, Secretary of the Patriotic Fund; and Chairman of the Pensions and Disabilities Board. "For services in or for the Overseas Dominions, Colonies and Protectorates, in connection with the War."	
1 January 1918	Margaret Agnes, Lady Davidson	"For services in connection with the Women's Patriotic Association".	
1 January 1918	The Most Reverend Maurus Caruana	Archbishop, Bishop of Malta. "For services in or for the Overseas Dominions, Colonies and Protectorates, in connection with the War."	
1 January 1918	Sir Everard Ferdinand im Thurn, KCMG, CB	Vice-Chairman, King George and Queen Mary's Club for the Oversea Forces. "For services in or for the Overseas Dominions, Colonies and Protectorates, in connection with the War."	
1 January 1918	Brigadier-General Sir William Henry Manning, KCMG, CB	Captain-General and Governor-in-Chief of the Island of Jamaica. "For services in or for the Overseas Dominions, Colonies and Protectorates, in connection with the War."	
1 January 1918	Laurence Aubrey Wallace, CMG	Administrator of Northern Rhodesia. "For services in or for the Overseas Dominions, Colonies and Protectorates, in connection with the War."	
1 January 1918	Sir Arthur Henderson Young, GCMG	Governor and Commander-in-Chief of the Straits Settlements. "For services in or for the Overseas Dominions, Colonies and Protectorates, in connection with the War."	
3 June 1918	Colonel Henry Edward Fane Goold-Adams, CB, CMG	Late Controller, Munitions Inventions Department. "For services in connection with the War".	
3 June 1918	John Archer	Chairman of the advisory committee (Customs and Excise) on Wines and Spirits. "For services in connection with the War".	
3 June 1918	Captain Henry Dennis Readett-Bayley, JP, DL	Organiser of the Dennis Bayley Fund for the transport of wounded. "For services in connection with the War".	
3 June 1918	Arthur Shirley Benn, MP	Chairman, Belgian Relief Committee. "For services in connection with the War".	
3 June 1918	Harry Brittain	Founder of the American Officers' Club. "For services in connection with the War".	
3 June 1918	Brigadier-General Joseph Aloysius Byrne, CB	Inspector-General, Royal Irish Constabulary. "For services in connection with the War".	
3 June 1918	Hall Caine	"For services in connection with the War".	
3 June 1918	Theodore Gervase Chambers	Controller, National War Savings Committee. "For services in connection with the War".	
3 June 1918	Cyril Stephen Cobb, MVO	Late Chairman, London County Council. "For services in connection with the War".	
3 June 1918	Robert Lowden-Council	Deputy Director of Salvage. "For services in connection with the War".	
3 June 1918	Edward Marriott Cooke, MB	Chairman of the Board of Control. "For services in connection with the War".	
3 June 1918	Horace Darwin, FRS	Chairman of the Cambridge Scientific Instrument Co. Ltd; Member of the Munitions Inventions Department Panel. "For services in connection with the War".	
3 June 1918	John Duthie, JP	Senior Assistant Director-General of Voluntary Organisations. "For services in connection with the War".	
3 June 1918	John Esplen	Senior Partner in the firm of Messrs Esplen, Sons, and Swainston Ltd, Naval Architects. "For services in connection with the War".	
3 June 1918	John Ferguson	Assistant to the Surveyor-General of Supply, War Office. "For services in connection with the War".	
3 June 1918	Gilbert Francis Garnsey	Joint Controller of Munitions Accounts. "For services in connection with the War".	
3 June 1918	Lieutenant-Colonel Albert George Hadcock, TD, FRS	Managing Director, Sir W. G. Armstrong, Whitworth and Co. Ltd. "For services in connection with the War".	
3 June 1918	Cecil Reeves Harrison	Director, Messrs Harrison and Sons, Printers. "For services in connection with the War".	
3 June 1918	Sydney Herbert Holcroft Henn	Director of Array Priority. "For services in connection with the War".	
3 June 1918	Osborn George Holmden, JP	Director of the Inter-Allied Chartering Executive. "For services in connection with the War".	
3 June 1918	Alexander Cruikshank Houston, MB, CM, DSc	Director of Water Examinations, Metropolitan Water Board. "For services in connection with the War".	
3 June 1918	Henry Japp, CBE	Member of the British War Mission to the United States of America. "For services in connection with the War".	
3 June 1918	Walter Samuel Kinnear	Chairman of the Navy and Army Insurance Fund; Deputy Chairman of the National Health Insurance Commission (Ireland). "For services in connection with the War".	
3 June 1918	Hugh Gwynne Levick	Representative of the Treasury on the London Exchange Committee. "For services in connection with the War".	
3 June 1918	Bertram Lewis Lima	Ministry of Information. "For services in connection with the War".	
3 June 1918	Joseph Lowrey	Secretary, London Salvage Association. "For services in connection with the War".	
3 June 1918	John Lumsden, MD	Vice-Chairman of Joint VAD Committee, Ireland. "For services in connection with the War".	
3 June 1918	Harry Duncan McGowan	Managing Director of Nobel's Explosives Company, Ltd. "For services in connection with the War".	
3 June 1918	William Warrender Mackenzie, CBE, KC	A Chairman of the Committee on Production. "For services in connection with the War".	
3 June 1918	Sigismund Ferdinand Mendl	Member of the Royal Commission on Wheat Supplies. "For services in connection with the War".	
3 June 1918	Thomas Hudson Middleton, CB	Deputy Director-General, Food Production Department, Board of Agriculture. "For services in connection with the War".	
3 June 1918	Colonel Sir Frederic Lewis Nathan	Chairman, Standing Committee on the Causes of Explosions at Government and Controlled Factories, Ministry of Munitions; Chairman, Advisory Committee on Alcohol Supplies for War Purposes. "For services in connection with the War".	
3 June 1918	Adam Nimmo	President of the Mining Association of Great Britain; Chairman of the Board of Trade Committee on the Coal Trade after the War; Member of the Central Coal and Coke Supplies Committee. "For services in connection with the War".	
3 June 1918	Major William Orpen, ARA	"For services in connection with the War".	
3 June 1918	Admiral Sir Richard Henry Peirse, KCB, MVO	Naval Member of the Central Committee of the Board of Invention and Research. "For services in connection with the War".	
3 June 1918	Percival Lea Dewhurst Perry, CBE	Director of Mechanical Warfare, Ministry of Munitions. "For services in connection with the War".	
3 June 1918	Lindsey Byron Peters	Chairman, Engineer and Works Supply Committee, War Office. "For services in connection with the War".	
3 June 1918	James William Restler	Chairman of the Metropolitan Munitions Committee; Chief Engineer, Metropolitan Water Board. "For services in connection with the War".	
3 June 1918	Lieutenant-Colonel Walrond Arthur Frank Sinclair	Controller of Registration, Ministry of National Service; Director of National Service for the London Region. "For services in connection with the War".	
3 June 1918	Allan MacGregor Smith	Chairman of the Management Committee of the Engineering Employers Federation. "For services in connection with the War".	
3 June 1918	Harris Spencer, JP	Chairman of the Birmingham Board of Management, Ministry of Munitions; Chairman of the Midland Employers' Federation. "For services in connection with the War".	
3 June 1918	Howard Handley Spicer	Managing Director, Messrs. James Spicer & Sons, Ltd.; Technical Adviser to the War Office. "For services in connection with the War".	
3 June 1918	Lieutenant-Colonel Albert Stern, CMG	Liaison Officer between British and United States Tanks Department; late Director-General of Mechanical Warfare, Ministry of Munitions. "For services in connection with the War".	
3 June 1918	Colonel Robert King Stewart	Convener of the County of Lanark. "For services in connection with the War".	
3 June 1918	Robert Fox-Symons, MRCS, LRCP	Head of Auxiliary Hospitals Department, British Red Cross Society and Order of St John of Jerusalem. "For services in connection with the War".	
3 June 1918	James Taggart	Lord Provost of Aberdeen; Chairman of the Aberdeen Munitions Board of Management. "For services in connection with the War".	
3 June 1918	His Honour Judge William Francis Kyffin Taylor	Judge of the Liverpool Court of Passage. "For services in connection with the War".	
3 June 1918	Colonel Sir Courtauld Thomson, CB	Chief British Red Cross Commissioner for Malta and the Near East. "For services in connection with the War".	
3 June 1918	William Mitchell-Thomson, CBE, MP	Director of the Restriction of Enemy Supplies Department. "For services in connection with the War".	
3 June 1918	John Edward Thornycroft	Director, Messrs J. I. Thornycroft and Co. Ltd. "For services in connection with the War".	
3 June 1918	Seymour Biscoe Tritton	Partner, Messrs Rendel, Palmer and Tritton, Consulting Engineers. "For services in connection with the War".	
3 June 1918	William Ellis Hume-Williams, KC, MP	Liaison Officer between the War Trade Department and the Commission Internationale de Ravitaillement; late British Red Cross Commissioner, Petrograd; Member of the Central Prisoners of War Committee. "For services in connection with the War".	
3 June 1918	Thomas Fleming Wilson, JP	Clerk of the Peace for the City of Glasgow; Clerk to the General Munitions of War Tribunal for Scotland, and to the Local Tribunal for Glasgow; Agent of HM Procurator-General, and of the Treasury Solicitor in Glasgow. "For services in connection with the War".	
3 June 1918	Maharaja Bahadur Sir Bhagwati Prasad Singh, KCIE	Taluqdar of Balrampur, District Gonda, United Provinces. "For services in connection with the War".	
3 June 1918	Lieutenant-Colonel Frank Popham Young, CIE, CBE	Indian Army. Commissioner, Rawalpindi Division, Punjab. "For services in connection with the War".	
3 June 1918	Maharaja Bahadur Sir Rameshwar Singh, GCIE	Landholder, Bihar and Orissa. "For services in connection with the War".	
3 June 1918	Pirajirav Bapu Sahib Ghatge, CSI, CIE	Chief of Kagal (senior branch), Kolbapur, Bombay. "For services in connection with the War".	
3 June 1918	Colonel George Samuel Abercrombie Harvey Pasha, CMG	Head of Police and Provost Marshal of Cairo. "For services in connection with the War".	
3 June 1918	Katharine Marjory Stewart-Murray, Duchess of Atholl	President, Perthshire Branch, British Red Cross Society. "For services in connection with the War".	
3 June 1918	Florence Eveleen Eleanore, Lady Bell	President, North Riding of Yorkshire Branch, British Red Cross Society. "For services in connection with the War".	
3 June 1918	Hon. Maud Elizabeth Bevan	President of the Hertfordshire Branch, British Red Cross Society; Commandant, Royston Auxiliary Hospital. "For services in connection with the War".	
3 June 1918	Augusta Mary Monica Crichton-Stuart, Marchioness of Bute	Donor and Commandant, Bute House Naval Hospital, Rothesay. "For services in connection with the War".	
3 June 1918	Anna Maria, Lady Donner	Vice-President, Fallowfield Division, British Red Cross Society; Organiser of Fairview Auxiliary Hospital, Fallowfield. "For services in connection with the War".	
3 June 1918	Clarissa Reid	President of the Workers Committee, and Honorary Secretary, Anglo-South American Central Depot. "For services in connection with the War".	
3 June 1918	Aileen Mary Roberts, 2nd Countess Roberts	Honorary Secretary, Officers' Families Fund; founder of the Countess Roberts Field Glass Fund. "For services in connection with the War".	
3 June 1918	Mary Dorothea Waldegrave, Countess Waldegrave	Deputy President, Somersetshire Branch, British Red Cross Society. "For services in connection with the War".	
3 June 1918	John Russell French	General Manager, Bank of New South Wales. "For services in aid of War Finance."	
3 June 1918	Evelyn Ashley Wallers, CBE	President of the Transvaal Chamber of Mines.	
3 June 1918	Hon. Michael Patrick Cashin	Minister of Finance, Newfoundland. "For services in War matters and particularly finance".	
3 June 1918	Lieutenant-Colonel Arthur Robert Adams, VD	Unofficial Member of the Legislative Council of the Straits Settlements, and Officer Commanding the troops in Penang.	
3 June 1918	Honorary Lieutenant-Colonel Hector Livingstone Duff, CMG	Chief Secretary, Nyasaland Protectorate. "For services as Chief Political Officer in the South-Western Area of German East Africa."	
19 December 1918	Colonel Rhys Howell Price, CMG, CBE, VD	"For valuable services rendered within the Union of South Africa in connection with the campaigns in German South West Africa and German East Africa"	
