= Bilsland =

Bilsland is a surname. Notable people with the surname include:

- Billy Bilsland (born 1945), British racing cyclist
- Ethel Edith Bilsland (1892–1982), English composer, soprano, and pianist
- Baron Bilsland
  - Sir William Bilsland, 1st Baronet
  - Sir (Alexander) Steven Bilsland, 2nd Baronet
  - (Alexander) Steven Bilsland, 1st Baron Bilsland
