= Cantlie =

Cantlie is a surname. Notable people with the surname include:

- James Cantlie (1851–1926), Scottish physician
- John Cantlie (born 1970), British war photographer and correspondent
- Neil Cantlie (1892–1975), Scottish Royal Army Medical Corps officer, son of James Cantlie
