= Frederick Robertson =

Frederick Robertson may refer to:

- Frederick William Robertson (1816–1853), English divine
- Frederick Robertson (politician) (1909–2002), member of the Canadian House of Commons
- Fred Robertson (1911–1997), ice hockey player
- Frederick Robertson (English cricketer) (1843–1920), English cricketer
- Frederick Robertson (New Zealand cricketer) (1878-1966), New Zealand cricketer
- Frederick Robertson (judge) (1854–1918), judge and academic administrator
- Frederick Robertson (RAF officer) (1918–1943), flying ace of the Royal Air Force during the Second World War
