= Chinese super embassy project =

Relocation project in London, England

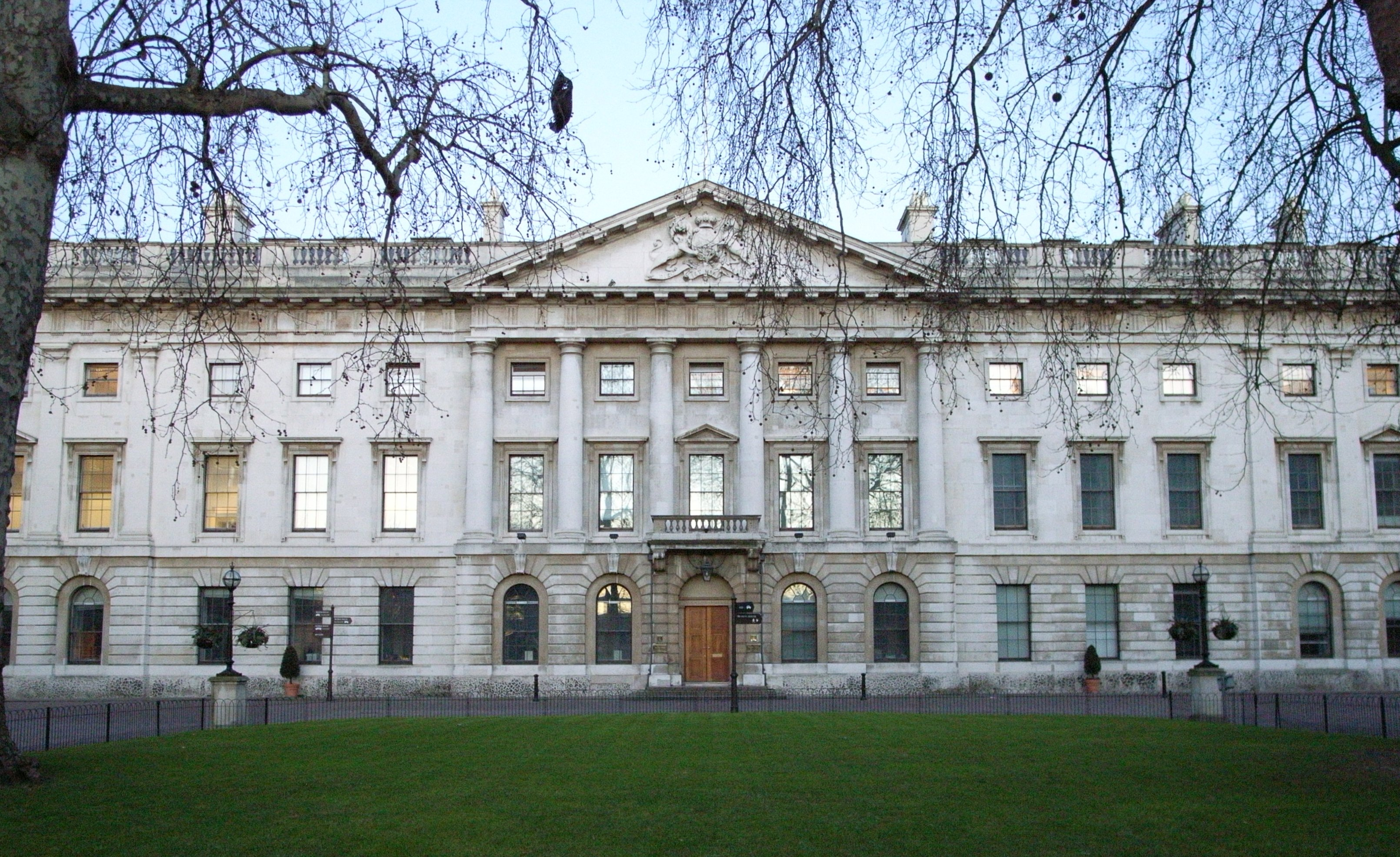
The Royal Mint Court in London

The "super embassy" project refers to the overall project of the Ministry of Foreign Affairs of China to relocate its embassy in the United Kingdom from its current location in Portland Place, London, to the former site of the Royal Mint on the north bank of the River Thames, adjacent to the Tower of London, and to carry out large-scale expansion and renovation. The project was launched in 2018. The Ministry of Foreign Affairs of China purchased a plot of land of about 5 acres for about £255 million and planned to build a comprehensive diplomatic facility with a total floor area of about 57,000 square meters. After completion, the embassy is expected to become the largest diplomatic institution of China in Europe, and also the largest foreign embassy and consulate in the United Kingdom.

Since the plan was made public, its location and design have been controversial. As the base is close to the City of London and has underground fiber optic communication facilities carrying sensitive information, British and American intelligence agencies and some politicians have expressed concern about potential espionage activities and data security risks. In addition, some space uses were obscured in the planning documents submitted for review, which aroused concern among human rights groups and some Hong Kong communities who have moved to the UK, who believed that the site could be used for cross-border repression or secret detention of dissidents. Although the application was rejected by the Tower Hamlets London Borough Council in 2022 on the grounds of public safety and privacy concerns, the British government subsequently regained the approval authority and officially approved the project on 20 January 2026 after completing multiple rounds of diplomatic and security assessments. This decision is generally interpreted as a pragmatic choice made by the UK between national security considerations and maintaining and improving Sino-British economic and trade relations.

== Background ==
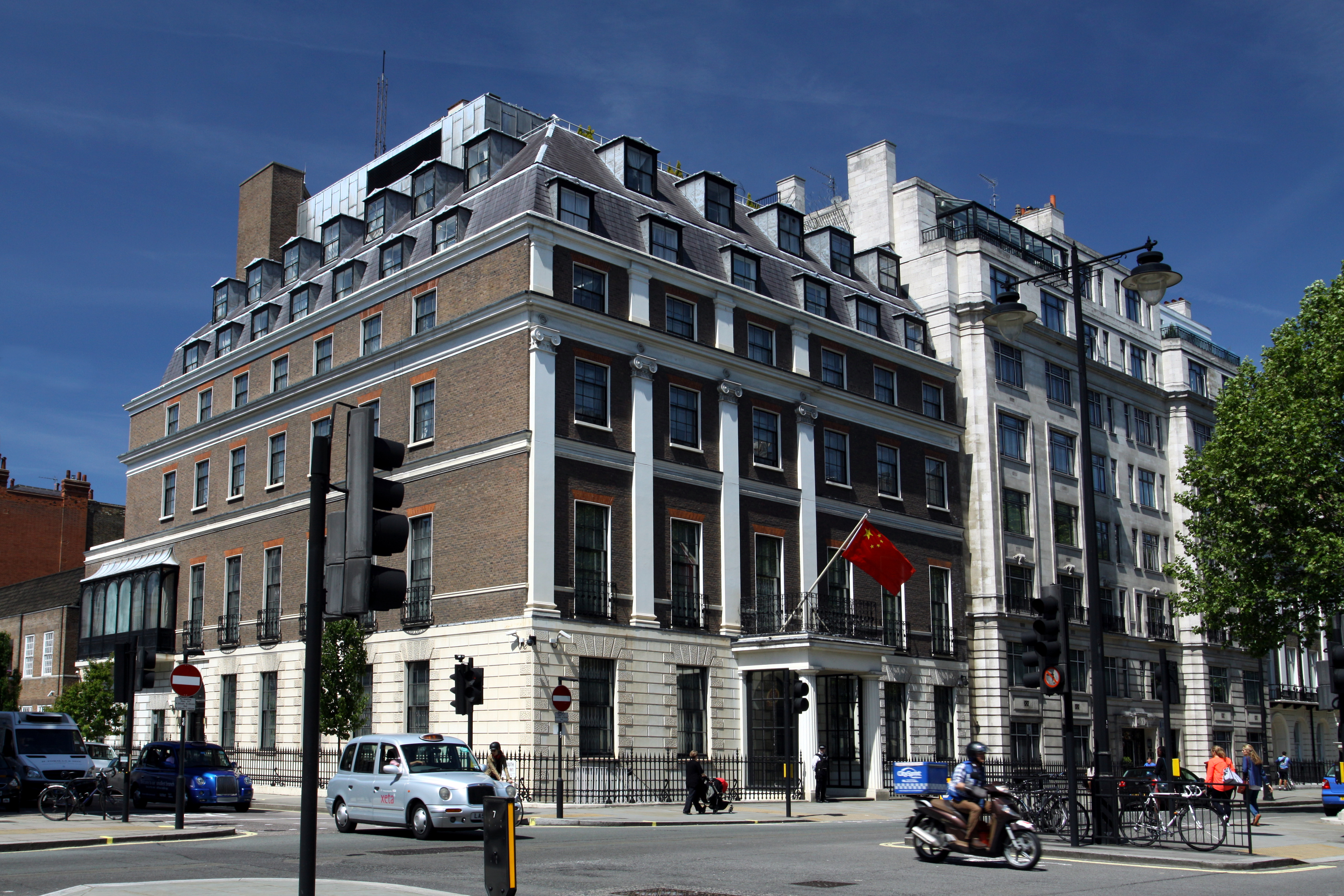
Building of Chinese Embassy in the Portland Place in London, June 2013

The history of Chinese diplomatic missions in the United Kingdom can be traced back to the end of the 19th century. In 1877, in order to deal with the Sino-British diplomatic crisis and the Margary Affair, the Qing government rented 49 Portland Lane in the West End of London as its first representative office in the UK, with Guo Songtao serving as the first imperial commissioner. Subsequently, the building was leased by the Republic of China and the People's Republic of China, and had been in use for more than a century and a half by the 2020s. The embassy building at 49 Portland Lane mainly consisted of two Grade II listed buildings built in 1785. Although a large-scale demolition and internal renovation were carried out in the 1980s, its internal area was only about 6,000 square meters.

As China's diplomatic business with the UK increases, the existing embassy building is facing serious space shortages and administrative inconveniences such as the scattered distribution of multiple departments. Since 2013, the Chinese government has been seeking to change the location of the embassy. Liu Xiaoming, then ambassador to the UK, pointed out that the existing facilities could no longer meet the diplomatic needs of the new era. In 2018, China spent £255 million to purchase the former site of the Royal Mint, located opposite the Tower of London and near the City of London. The site has a long history and was once used as a plague cemetery, a Royal Navy facility and a coin mint. It covers an area of about 5 acres and can provide about 65,000 square meters of usable space, which is more than ten times the size of the old embassy. China plans to build the new site into a one-stop comprehensive office building, integrating visa, education, science and technology departments, and establishing a dormitory and cultural exchange center that can accommodate hundreds of employees to showcase its image as a major power in diplomacy.

== Purchase and design ==
Since 2013, China has been conducting site selection assessments in London to find a suitable location for setting up new embassy facilities. Finally, it selected the former site of the Royal Mint, which is located across the London Tower and has both historical value and a strategic location. The relevant transaction was completed in May 2018, with the Chinese government purchasing the land of about 5 acres from the real estate developer for about £255 million.

The architectural design of the "Super Embassy" was undertaken by David Chipperfield. The core concept is to combine the preservation of historical buildings with the functional needs of modern diplomatic institutions. The overall plan is to restore and expand several historical buildings on the site of the former Royal Mint, including preserving the appearance of buildings built in the early 19th century that are listed as Grade II listed buildings in the UK, while adding modern buildings on the site to form a fully functional diplomatic park.

The project covers an area of approximately 2.3 hectares, with a total floor area of approximately 55,000 to 65,000 square meters, which is about twice the size of the Chinese Embassy in the United States. The overall plan includes facilities such as the embassy office building, the "Cultural Exchange Building" and the "Historical Heritage Conservation Center". The design scheme particularly emphasizes the protection and reuse of the original Royal Mint historical buildings, and plans to restore and revitalize the Johnson Smirke Building and the Seamen's Registry, which have been vacant since 2013, while demolishing the annex structures added in the 1980s that are considered to be of lower quality.

According to publicly available planning documents, the new embassy will integrate China's seven current offices scattered throughout London, with functions including diplomatic and administrative offices, cultural centers, large underground parking lots, and residences, apartments and studios for senior diplomats. The embassy also plans to provide about 200 staff dormitories, ranging from open-plan to three-bedroom units, and includes a canteen, garden, and social and study spaces. To improve overall operational efficiency and security, the design proposes to build an underground tunnel to connect the basement spaces of the two main buildings, which will be used as a machine room, storage facilities and low-temperature service passage. In addition, since the site contains the ruins of the 14th-century St Mary Graces Abbey, the Chinese side stated in the plan that it will preserve and display the relevant archaeological remains and plans to open them to the public under certain conditions. However, for security reasons, visitors will have to undergo security checks similar to those at airports.

Despite some planning and architecture experts affirming the design's aesthetic and sustainability features, the project's underground facilities have sparked widespread national security controversy. Unredacted building plans show that the underground space is planned to have as many as 208 rooms, with a particular focus on a triangular concealed space beneath the Seamen's Registry building. This area is separated from fiber optic communication cables carrying critical data from the City of London by only one wall and includes a complex high-temperature air extraction system, raising concerns that it may be used to deploy high-performance electronic reconnaissance equipment or large computer servers.

British security officials also expressed concerns about the arrangement to open the site to visitors, pointing out that since the embassy site involves "diplomatic inviolability", in the event of an emergency, the police or rescue personnel may not be able to enter the relevant area in time, thus creating potential security and emergency risks.

== Planning applications and disputes ==
Since China acquired the site of the former Royal Mint Court in London for approximately £255 million in 2018, the plan to build a "super embassy" in the UK has triggered years of policy deliberation, diplomatic negotiations and public debate. Due to the large scale of the project, the highly sensitive location, and the potential national security risks involved, the relocation plan has gradually become one of the most controversial issues in Sino-British relations.

In addition to national security risks, the transparency of the planning proposal has also been questioned. In the application documents, the Chinese side "blacked out" a large number of room uses and internal configurations on the grounds of security, which led British planning lawyers and human rights organizations to worry that some spaces may be used for illegal imprisonment or cross-border repression of dissidents. When the planning application was first submitted in 2022, it was unanimously rejected by the Tower Hamlets London Borough Council because it was considered to have a potential impact on public safety, the surrounding community and the historical environment. Subsequently, the relevant decision was examined in a broader diplomatic context. It was reported that the Chinese side expressed strong concerns to the Conservative Party government, and after the Labour Party won the general election in 2024, the British government exercised its authority to "take over" the case and reinstate it to the central level approval process.

The controversy surrounding the plan is not limited to the impact of the building itself on the urban landscape and residents' lives. Critics pointed out that the site is close to an important communication node in the City of London and has key fiber optic infrastructure underground, which may lead to the risk of mass surveillance, economic espionage and damage to the security of critical infrastructure. At the same time, some Hong Kong communities and political dissident groups living in the UK also expressed concern that the facility could be used as a base for cross-border repression, thereby threatening their personal safety and freedom of assembly.

Despite the fact that local governments had repeatedly rejected the application on the grounds of public safety, and that cross-party members of parliament and some international allies had publicly opposed it, the British government finally officially approved the plan in January 2026 against the backdrop of warming Sino-British diplomatic interactions and the Labour government's intention to restart economic cooperation with China. Many media reports indicated that this decision was intended to break the long deadlock and pave the way for British Prime Minister Keir Starmer's visit to China later that month. However, the approval immediately triggered legal challenges, which further evolved the incident into a complex conflict involving geopolitical considerations, national security assessments and civil rights disputes.

=== Security and espionage concerns ===
The new embassy is located near the City of London, a location that has raised widespread national security concerns due to its proximity to critical communications facilities. At the heart of the controversy is that the base is underlaid with multiple fiber optic cables that support global financial transactions and internet data transmission. Some politicians in the UK and the US have pointed out that the location could provide foreign governments with the opportunity to access and interfere with critical infrastructure, thereby posing a potential risk to financial and communications security.

Unredacted planning documents disclosed by the The Daily Telegraph show that some spaces in the embassy's basement are very close to the main fiber optic cables buried under Mansell Street. One facility described as a hidden room is only about one meter away from the cable. The cable is responsible for carrying a large amount of financial transaction information and communication traffic between the City of London and external data centers. In the overall design, there are as many as 208 rooms in the basement with unspecified uses. Some of these spaces overlap or are adjacent to key communication facilities, raising questions about whether they may be used for electronic surveillance or other intelligence purposes.

Some intelligence and security experts pointed out that during construction or renovation, it is theoretically possible to take advantage of the proximity of the building structure to the fiber optic cable to carry out data interception or monitoring activities; at the same time, the large ventilation and heat dissipation system that appears in the plan is also interpreted as a facility that may support the operation of high-power electronic devices.

In addition to technical concerns, the size and internal configuration of the embassy have also become the focus of discussion. As the plan includes a large number of staff dormitories, underground tunnels and multi-level basement structures, some critics believe that such enclosed spaces that are difficult to be externally supervised may increase the risk of intelligence activities or other undisclosed uses. British security agencies, including MI5 and GCHQ, have submitted a classified assessment report to the government, which believes that the relevant risks can be managed through specific "mitigation measures", but at the same time acknowledges that it is impossible to eliminate all potential national security risks in practice for embassy facilities that are diplomatically inviolable.

Some opposition politicians have expressed continued concern about this. Conservative Shadow Home Secretary Chris Philp pointed out that the inability of British authorities to inspect the interior of the embassy during construction or after the building is completed means that related activities are difficult to effectively monitor. Other politicians pointed out that the expansion of the embassy may lead to an increase in the number of personnel with diplomatic immunity, thereby increasing the potential risk of foreign political influence and interference.

At the same time, human rights groups and exiled dissidents also expressed concern that the space in the embassy with an unclear purpose might be used to monitor or pressure overseas dissident communities. The concerns were particularly pronounced among the Hong Kong community in the UK, with some pointing out that past incidents of diplomatic personnel clashing with protesters outside the Chinese consulate in Manchester had made them more uneasy about the size and security arrangements of the new embassy. Despite facing questions from cross-party members of parliament and some allies, the British government stated that concentrating the relevant diplomatic functions in a single location would help improve the UK's overall oversight and risk management capabilities, and attempted to respond to external concerns about security issues.

=== Rejection of local councils ===
In December 2022, the Tower Hamlets London Borough Council voted for the first time on the planning application for the new Chinese Embassy in the United Kingdom. Despite the recommendation of the city planning officials to approve the application, the Strategic Development Committee under the council overwhelmingly rejected the application. The committee noted in its resolution that the project could trigger large-scale protests, which would have adverse effects on public safety, historical preservation and the privacy of the surrounding residents. The councilors also believed that the new embassy site was likely to become a long-term gathering point for political demonstrations, which would put continuous pressure on police deployment, traffic operations and daily life in the community.

After the veto was announced, China expressed its dissatisfaction and lodged a protest with the then Conservative government, emphasizing that as the host country, Britain should provide necessary facilitation for the establishment of diplomatic premises in accordance with international practice. Politico reported that China also allegedly used obstruction of the renovation of the British Embassy in China as a means of retaliation, turning the case into a diplomatic deadlock.

After the Labour Party came to power in 2024, China submitted a planning application with roughly the same content to the local council again in August of the same year. In October of the same year, Deputy Prime Minister and Housing Minister Angela Rayner announced the use of "takeover power" to take back the approval power of the case from the local government and put it under the control of the central government. British Prime Minister Keir Starmer later mentioned this matter in a meeting with Chinese leader Xi Jinping and said that the UK would handle the relevant planning application in accordance with the established legal procedures.

During the review led by the central government, Tower Hamlets London Borough Council no longer had the final decision-making power, but in December of the same year it passed a non-legally binding resolution reiterating that if it were to review the case, it would again reject the case based on considerations of residents' safety and privacy. Subsequently, the planning prosecutor appointed by the central government launched a hearing and technical review process that lasted for several months. During the review process, compliance questions arose because some of the plan's contents were obscured, but with the intervention and coordination of the Foreign Secretary and the Home Secretary, and the withdrawal of objections after the Metropolitan Police reassessed the space for protest activities and the deployment of police force, the relevant obstacles were gradually removed.

Finally, after several postponements of the decision-making timeline, Housing Minister Steve Reed formally approved the planning application on 20 January 2026, through quasi-judicial procedures. The decision immediately drew criticism from some local groups and members of parliament, who argued that the central government's intervention weakened local autonomy and failed to adequately address national security considerations.

== Reactions ==
=== United Kingdom ===
==== Politicians ====
Conservative Party Shadow Foreign Secretary Priti Patel condemned the decision as a "kowtowing" to the Chinese Communist Party, surrendering national security and abandoning the Hong Kong community on British soil. She criticized Prime Minister Keir Starmer for prioritizing economic interests over national security. She also criticized the establishment of a massive spy hub in the heart of the capital. Calum Miller, the Liberal Democrats foreign affairs spokesman, warned that the decision would strengthen China's surveillance capabilities in the UK, describing it as "the biggest mistake" since Starmer took office, endangering data security. He also disregarded the safety of Hong Kongers seeking asylum in the UK. The Reform UK described it as a "desperate move" by the government, arguing that it seriously threatened national security interests. In addition, some Labour Party members also expressed their dissatisfaction, believing that approving the project would have a chilling effect on the exiled Tibetan, Uyghur and Hong Kong communities.

==== Civil society organizations and judicial review ====
Since the "super embassy" plan was made public, local residents’ groups and several human rights organizations have continued to express their opposition. The Royal Mint Residents Association, composed of neighboring residents, pointed out that the embassy site is very close to the surrounding houses, with some areas separated only by wooden fences, the closest of which is about 8.5 meters. The organization said that residents are worried about the possibility of increased security and surveillance measures in the future, and the potential risks of demonstrations or security incidents. In addition to security and privacy concerns, opponents also criticized the plan for involving the sale of historically valuable public land to foreign governments, arguing that the decision did not fully consider the long-term interests of the local community.

After the government officially approved the plan, the Royal Mint Residents Association, together with several human rights groups, including the Inter-Parliamentary Alliance on China (IPAC), and some cross-party members of parliament, announced that they would file for judicial review with the High Court of Justice to seek to overturn the relevant decision. The alliance then launched a crowdfunding campaign and raised more than £145,000 in a short period of time after the approval was announced. They appointed Charles Banner, a barrister who had served as a government advisor, to lead the legal action. One of their legal arguments focused on the potential impact on residents’ privacy rights after the embassy was built, as well as the potential impact on the stability of the surrounding living environment. Some residents’ representatives also questioned the central government's approval process as a mere formality, believing that Prime Minister Keir Starmer's previous promises to China in international forums had presupposed the approval result and were suspected of political interference in the legal process.

In the UK, Hong Kong communities, as well as Uyghur and Tibetan organizations, have become important participants in the opposition action. They feel "deeply betrayed" by the government's decision. Related groups pointed out that given that some dissidents have been wanted or pressured by China in the UK, the significantly expanded embassy facilities may exacerbate the risk of surveillance and intimidation of overseas communities. The executive director of the IPAC executive-director Luke de Pulford criticized the government for ignoring years of national security warnings and choosing to yield to "Beijing’s money bag". In February and March 2025, large-scale rallies involving thousands of people broke out in London several times. Demonstrators chanted slogans such as "super embassy, super mistake" and launched "London Transport Safety Day" to express their dissatisfaction. The Guardian quoted demonstrators as questioning that the huge amount of accommodation space and basement rooms not specified in the application documents made the oppressed groups worry that the secret detention of Sun Yat-sen ordeal would be repeated.

After the government officially approved the plan in January 2026, the opposition group launched another online fundraising campaign called "David Challenges Goliath", raising more than £30,000 to support further legal assessments and potential litigation. The Royal Mint Court Residents’ Association (RMCRA) brought legal action against the Ministry of Housing, Communities and Local Government and the London Borough of Tower Hamlets at the High Court of Justice in January 2026. According to Politico, legal professionals pointed out that even if judicial review may not directly stop the plan from proceeding, the related litigation process may still cause a significant delay in the project's progress, or even until after the next UK general election in 2029. The change in the political environment at that time may also bring new uncertainties to the prospects of the embassy project. In July 2026, a two-judge pannel of the High Court rejected all grounds of the challenge brought forth by the RMCRA, stating the government's decision to grant the approval for the Chinese embassy project was lawful.

Former University of Reading lecturer Ding Hongliang pointed out that although the case involves national security, for most British people, livelihood issues such as the economy and immigration are still of higher priority, so the public backlash may not necessarily turn into a national political crisis.

==== Hong Kong politicians in exile ====
Finn Lau, a politician wanted by the Hong Kong police for violating the Hong Kong National Security Law, and Nathan Law, a former member of the Hong Kong Legislative Council, are longtime critics of the "super embassy" plan. They pointed out that the plan is closely related to "cross-border surveillance" against them, and that many suspected surveillance operations against them were disclosed during the embassy's review process. Other exiled political and related figures wanted for the same reason have expressed concern about this.

Simon Cheng, founder of the Hong Kong Association of British Overseas Chinese, pointed out that the plan made the Hong Kong community fleeing the crackdown in Beijing feel that their personal safety was threatened and worried that the new embassy would become a base for monitoring dissidents; former Wan Chai District Councillor Cheung Ka-lai said that the British government's approval was tantamount to showing weakness to the CCP; former Wong Tai Sin District Councillor Lau Ka-man pointed out that the embassy would become the "center of cross-border repression". She revealed that she was wanted by the Hong Kong police with a HK$1 million bounty and that her neighbors had even received bribes to help send her to the embassy. Therefore, she was extremely worried about this large building with a "gray area"; former Sha Tin District Councillor Ting Tsz-yuen criticized the Labour government for "selling national security for money" and emphasized that as long as the plan is not overturned, Hong Kong people will continue to stand up and protest.

Former Hong Kong Confederation of Trade Unions Director-General and founder of the UK Hong Kong Labour Rights Monitor, Mong Siu-tat, felt "betrayed" by the Labour government's decision. He believed that this move was undoubtedly encouraging the Chinese Communist Party regime to carry out more radical "oppression" of overseas dissidents. Former Deputy Chief Executive of the Hong Kong Public Opinion Research Institute Chung Kim-wah cited the violent conflict that had occurred at the Chinese Consulate General in Manchester as an example, questioning whether the staff of the new embassy might harass peaceful demonstrators even more severely after its completion.

=== International ===
- China: The Chinese Embassy in the UK welcomed the decision, reiterated that building the new embassy was an international obligation and would more effectively promote understanding and mutually beneficial cooperation between the two peoples, and refuted all espionage allegations as "baseless and malicious slander".
- United States: The U.S. government expressed deep concern about this. John Moolenaar, chairman of the U.S. House Select Committee on Strategic Competition between the United States and the Chinese Communist Party, accused the decision of being "contrary to common sense" and argued that it was actually rewarding China's interference in and espionage activities in the British Parliament. White House officials also reiterated their deep concern about hostile forces using the critical infrastructure of allies. The BBC News reported that, according to sources, U.S. President Donald Trump had urged the UK to reject the application. U.S. House Speaker Mike Johnson publicly stated that the security threat was "very real" and that Trump administration officials had privately expressed strong opposition to British diplomats, fearing that the location of the embassy would jeopardize the security of information sharing among the Five Eyes alliance members.
