= John Samuels (disambiguation) =

John Samuels may refer to:

- John S. Samuels III
- John S. Samuels IV (John Stockwell) (born 1961), American actor

== See also ==
- John Samuel (disambiguation)
