= Halliday McCartney =

British military surgeon and diplomat (1833-1906)

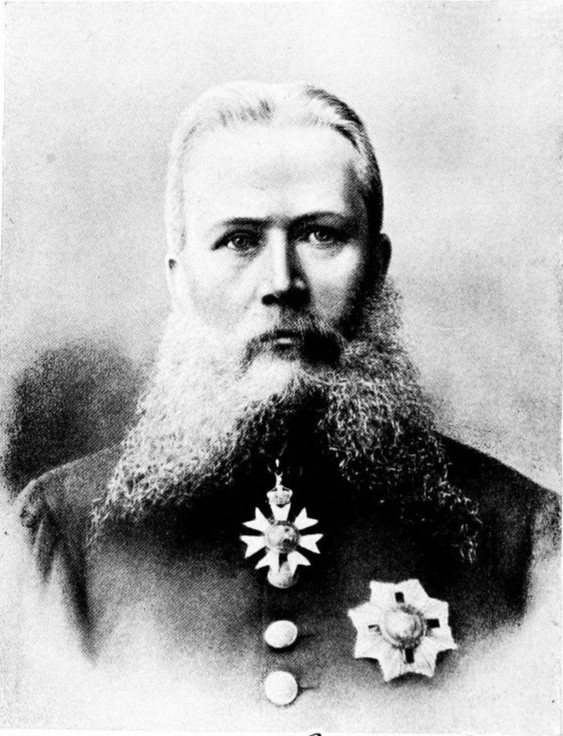
Sir Halliday McCartney

Sir Samuel Halliday Macartney CMG, KCMG (1833–1906) was a British military surgeon and diplomat serving the Chinese government during the late Qing dynasty.

He was a member of the same family as George Macartney, 1st Earl Macartney, the 18th century British ambassador to China (see Macartney Embassy).

Macartney was born near Castle Douglas on 24 May 1833. He studied medicine at the University of Edinburgh Medical School, graduating MD in 1858 with a thesis on phthisis. He served as a surgeon in the Crimean War, then went with his regiment to China and resigned his commission to join the Chinese army of General Charles Gordon which was subduing the Taiping rebels. He decided to make his home in China and married the niece of Chinese politician Li Hongzhang in December 1864. He became a civil servant of the Chinese imperial government, first in China and then in England. His first wife was a near relative of Lar Wang (納王郜雲官), one of the leaders of the Taiping rebellion. They had three sons and a daughter; the eldest son, George, served as the British representative in Kashgar for 28 years. The family lived in Nanjing until 1876 when Macartney left for London to serve as secretary to successive Chinese ministers at the Court of St James. His wife stayed behind and died two years later.

He served as Counsellor to the Chinese Legation in London for the remaining 30 years of his life. Notably, he oversaw the capture and detainment of Chinese nationalist leader Sun Yat-Sen at the Chinese Legation in 1896. (Note: "Sir Halliday Macartney's long official connexion with China had made him almost a Chinaman in feeling. This was shown by the action he took in the kidnapping of a Chinese reformer in London. The man, who was a member of the medical profession, escaped deportation and execution only by the energetic intervention of Lord Salisbury at the instance of Mr. Cantlie and Sir Patrick Manson, whom the prisoner contrived to acquaint with his perilous situation.") Macartney intended to deport Sun Yat-Sen back to the Qing Empire for execution, but the intervention of Sun's ally and former teacher Sir James Cantlie turned the imprisonment into a press sensation, and brought public support to Sun. Macartney released Sun Yat-Sen after 12 days of detainment, under pressure from the foreign office. The incident greatly raised Sun Yat-Sen's public profile as a reformer and revolutionary, and gave his movement more clout; Sun would go on to lead the revolution that overthrew the Qing and found the Republic of China.

Macartney remarried in 1884 Jeanne Léon du Satoy, daughter of the French portrait painter Jacques Léon du Sautoy, of Fontainebleau (1817–1895). Lady Macartney died at Hove, near Brighton, on 9 September 1902, and was interred at Dundrennan Abbey, Kirkcudbrightshire, Scotland seven days later. Sir Halliday died on 8 June 1906 at his home, Kenbank, St John's Town of Dalry and was also buried at Dundrennan Abbey.

Macartney received the first grade of the second class of the Imperial Chinese Order of the Double Dragon (雙龍寶星) in May 1902.
