= 1896 Glasgow Corporation election =

Local election in Scotland

Results by ward.

Elections to the Corporation of the City of Glasgow were held on Tuesday 3 November 1896, alongside municipal elections across Scotland, and the wider British local elections.

The usual process was for one third of the councillors to be re-elected annually, however Glasgow had seen boundary extensions and had transformed from a Town Council to a City Corporation, and as such the election saw all 75 councillors from all 25 wards (3 councillors per ward) seeking re-election simultaneously. This was the first time since 3 November 1846 that all of Glasgow's councillors had been up for re-election simultaneously. The 1846 re-election had occurred as a result of the towns of Calton, Anderston, and the Gorbals being subsumed into Glasgow.

The election saw a group of social and civic reformers known as the Progressive Union emerge as the largest group on the council. The Progressive's had been inspired by the London-based Progressive Party, although Glasgow's Progressive platform had a more evangelical religious focus, combined with a belief in temperance, observance of the sabbath, and good municipal governance.

Contests took place in 23 of the cities 25 wards, with only the wards of Kingston and Sandyford going uncontested. Overall 114 candidates contested the 75 seats. The election saw an unusually heavy turnout, with female voters in particular voting in unprecedented numbers. This was credited to the efforts and influence of the new Progressive Union grouping.

The election was also the first to be contested by the Workers Municipal Elections Committee, which had been set up in June 1896 and comprised the Irish National League, the Independent Labour Party, and the Co-operative movement. This grouping was brought together under the leadership of John Ferguson (elected for Calton ward), a prominent Irish Home Rule activist with close contacts to both the Labour movement and radical politics.

== Aggregate results ==
Glasgow Corporation election, 1896 (Contested seats)
Party	Seats	Gains	Losses	Net gain/loss	Seats %	Votes %	Votes	+/−
Progressive Union								
Unionist								
Ind. Labour Party	3							

== Ward results ==
=== Anderston ===
Anderston 3 seat Electorate: 5242 Spoiled votes: 42
Party	Candidate	Votes	%	±%
Joint-ticket	William Bilsland (incumbent)	2191		
Joint-ticket	Hugh Wallace (incumbent)	1708		
'People's candidate	Cpt. John Walker	1463		
'Popular' candidate	Robert Somerville Brown	1380		
'Workers' candidate	Francis J. Doran	1059		
Majority				
Turnout				

=== Blackfriars ===
Blackfriars 3 seat Electorate: 4441 Spoiled votes: 34
Party	Candidate	Votes	%	±%
Re-elect Joint-ticket	Alexander Osborne (incumbent)^{c}	1793		
Re-elect Joint-ticket	Adam M. Dunlop	1752		
Re-elect Joint-ticket	William Fife (incumbent)	1563		
Ratepayers	James Quigley	974		
'One of yourselves'	Marr Grieve	908		
Majority				
Turnout				

=== Broomielaw ===
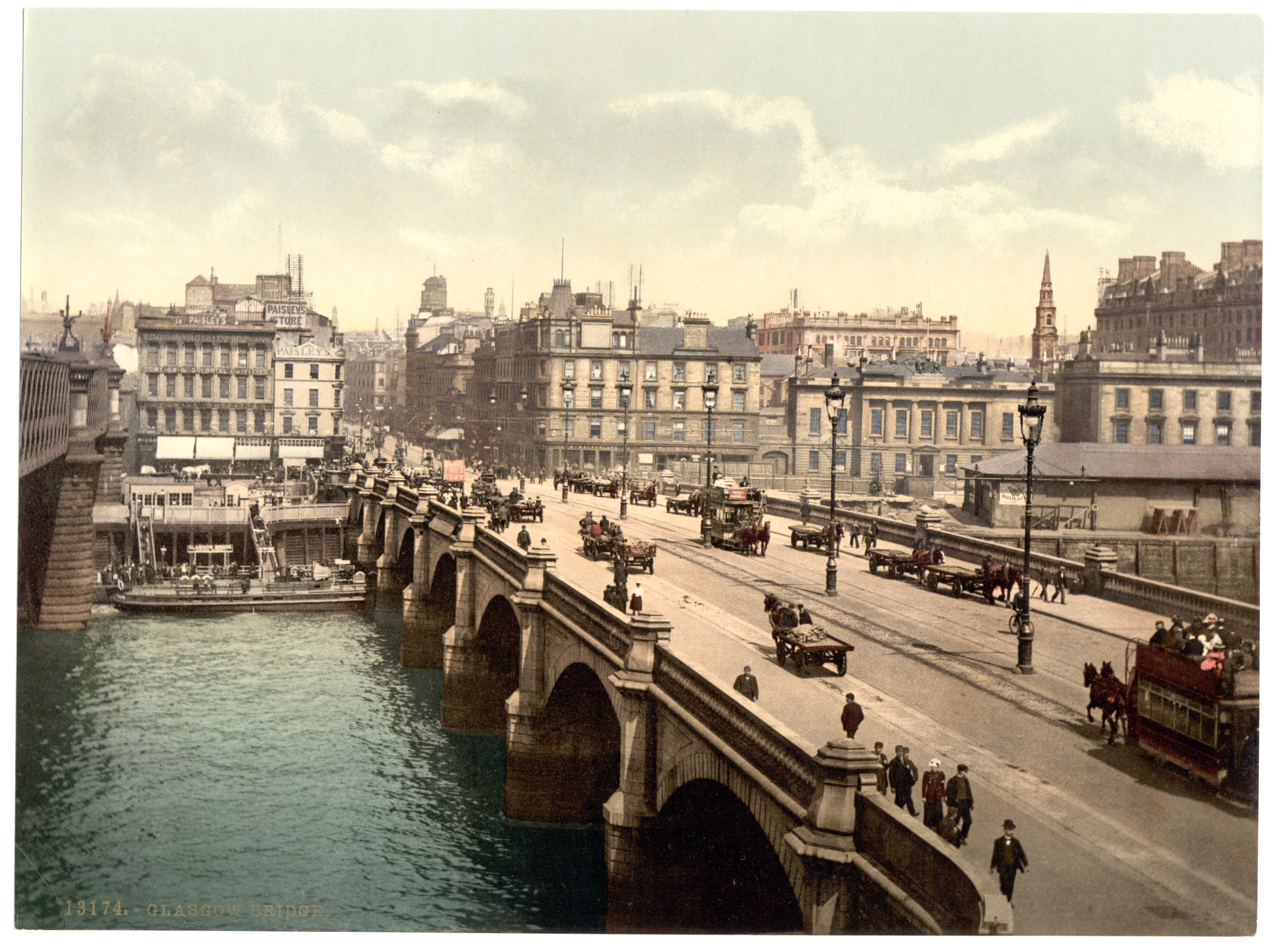
View across Glasgow Bridge to the Broomielaw (left side of bridge) and Exchange (right side) wards.

=== Calton ===
Calton (2nd Ward, previously 4th) 3 seat Electorate: 6400 Spoiled votes: 49
Party	Candidate	Votes	%	±%
Ind. Nationalist	Councillor John Ferguson (incumbent)	2,717	21.94	
	ex-Baillie James McLennan	2,216	17.90	
Ind. Labour Party	Boyd S. Brown	1,940	15.67	
Socialist	W. G. Hunter	1834	14.81	
	Robert Harvie	1283	10.36	
	John S. Lawson	1026	8.29	
	Thomas McDougall	809	6.53	
	Robert Burns	557	4.50	
Majority				
Turnout		≈4127	≈64.48	
Independent hold		Swing		
Independent hold		Swing		
Independent hold		Swing		

=== Cowcaddens ===
Cowcaddens 3 seat Electorate: 6446 Spoiled votes: 35
Party	Candidate	Votes	%	±%
Independent	Simon Dallas	2775		
Re-elect Joint-Ticket	Treasurer James Gray (incumbent)	2491		
Progressive	Dr John Carswell	2428		
Re-elect Joint-Ticket	ex-Bailie Robert Graham (incumbent)	1855		
Irish Nationalist / Trade Unionist / Social Reformer	Joseph F. McGroary	1383		
Majority				
Turnout				

=== Darlmarnock ===
Ward I: Darlmarnock 3 seat Electorate: 8972 Spoiled votes: 50
Party	Candidate	Votes	%	±%
Independent	James Willock (incumbent)	3,284		
Ind. Labour Party	John Cronin	2,397		
Independent	John Pollock McPhun (incumbent)	2,131		
Progressive	William George Hunter	1834		
Progressive	J.M. Macmannus	1824		
Majority				
Turnout				
Independent hold		Swing		
Independent hold		Swing		
Progressive gain from Independent				

=== Dennistoun ===
Dennistoun 3 seat Electorate: 4843 Spoiled votes:
Party	Candidate	Votes	%	±%
Ind. Temperance	Thomas M. Cunningham	1987		
Temperance Joint-Ticket	Hugh Brechin (incumbent)	1933		
Temperance Joint-Ticket	James M. Jack (incumbent)	1719		
Temperance Joint-Ticket	James McLachlan	1520		
Majority				
Turnout				

=== Exchange ===
Exchange 3 seat Electorate: 2172 Spoiled votes: 12
Party	Candidate	Votes	%	±%
	Robert Murdoch (incumbent)	886		
	Thomas Watson (incumbent)	849		
	James R. Paton (incumbent)	812		
	Hugh Caldwell	503		
Majority				
Turnout				

=== Gorbals ===
Gorbals 3 seat Electorate: 6723 Spoiled votes: 33
Party	Candidate	Votes	%	±%
	W. Fleming Anderson (incumbent)	2,950		
	James R. Sandilands	2,716		
	William Stevenson (incumbent)	2,275		
	Henry Vallance	1821		
	Thomas Neilson	1153		
Majority				
Turnout				

=== Hutchesontown ===
Hutchesontown 3 seat Electorate: 6721 Spoiled votes: 86
Party	Candidate	Votes	%	±%
	David Richmond (incumbent)	2,658		
	P. G. Stewart (incumbent)	2,652		
Progressive	John Battersby (incumbent)	2,605		
	D. J. M. Quin	1389		
Majority				
Turnout				

=== Kelvinside ===
Kelvinside 3 seat Electorate: 3151 Spoiled votes: 17
Party	Candidate	Votes	%	±%
Re-elect Joint-Ticket	Bailie James Dick (incumbent)	1198		
Re-elect Joint-Ticket	Bailie Robert M. Mitchell (incumbent)	1113		
Re-elect Joint-Ticket	Bailie James M. J. Thomson (incumbent)	1085		
Progressive	William Martin	756		
Majority				
Turnout				

=== Kingston ===
Kingston 3 seat Electorate: Spoiled votes:
Party	Candidate	Votes	%	±%
	Shearer (ex-Baillie)	Uncontested		
	Primrose (ex-Baillie)	Uncontested		
	Paton (ex-Baillie)	Uncontested		
Majority				
Turnout				

=== Langside ===
Langside 3 seat Electorate: 3879 Spoiled votes: 26
Party	Candidate	Votes	%	±%
Re-elect Joint-Ticket	Baillie William Maclay (incumbent)	1649		
Re-elect Joint-Ticket	Councillor Alexander Sinclair (incumbent)	1605		
Re-elect Joint-Ticket	Councillor John L. Oatts (incumbent)	1296		
Independent	James Hunter (Ex-Provost)	1111		
Majority				
Turnout				

=== Mile-end ===
Mile-end 3 seat Electorate: 5983 Spoiled votes: 54
Party	Candidate	Votes	%	±%
	George Mitchell (incumbent)	2,170		
Ind. Labour Party	James Shaw Maxwell	2,040		
	James Hamilton (incumbent)	1,760		
	Daniel M. Scott	1619		
	Alexander R. McGregor	1579		
Majority				
Turnout				

=== Park ===
Park 3 seat Electorate: Spoiled votes: 33
Party	Candidate	Votes	%	±%
Joint-ticket	Joseph Currie Robertson	1861		
Joint-ticket	Alexander Brown	1840		
Joint-ticket	Robert Paterson	1819		
	Archibald C. Holms (incumbent)	1457		
	John Harrison	1289		
Majority				
Turnout				

=== Sandyford ===
Sandyford 3 seat Electorate: Spoiled votes:
Party	Candidate	Votes	%	±%
	Baillie Alexander (incumbent)	Uncontested		
	McFarlane (ex-Baillie)	Uncontested		
	Preceptor James Hunter Dickson	Uncontested		
Majority				
Turnout				

=== Springburn ===
Springburn 3 seat Electorate: 4810 Spoiled votes: 35
Party	Candidate	Votes	%	±%
Joint-ticket	Dr William Dougan	2000		
Joint-ticket	George B. Main (incumbent)	1974		
Joint-ticket	William Cochrane	1613		
Vetoist & Trade Unionist	Patrick O'Hare	1457		
Majority				
Turnout				

=== Townhead ===
Townhead 3 seat Electorate: 6749 Spoiled votes: 46
Party	Candidate	Votes	%	±%
Independent Progressive	Norman MacLeod Thomson^{α}	2846		
Progressive	William Finlay (incumbent)^{α}	2011		
Progressive	David Morris (incumbent)^{α}	1965		
Workers candidate	William Forsyth^{b}	1793		
Progressive	Michael Joseph Connell^{α}	1313		
Workers candidate	George Pringle^{b}	1273		
Majority				
Turnout				

=== Whitevale ===
Whitevale 3 seat Electorate: 6150 Spoiled votes: 36
Party	Candidate	Votes	%	±%
Unionist	James H. Martin (incumbent)	2,460		
Unionist	David Willox	1,774		
Progressive	John Dunn (incumbent)	1,646		
Ind. Labour Party	Hugh Murphy	1515		
Progressive	Hugh Blair	1247		
Majority				
Turnout				

=== Woodside ===
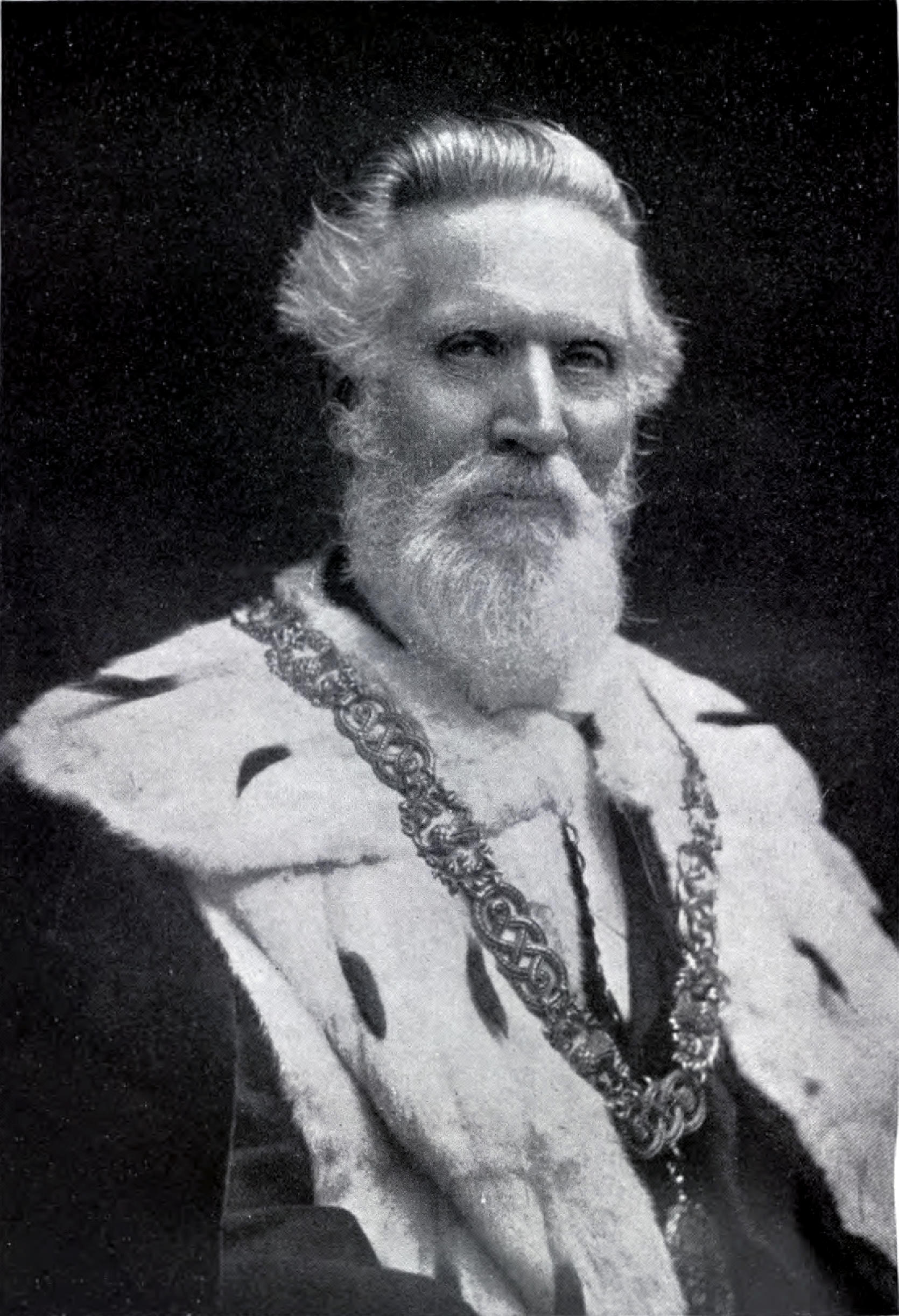
Samuel Chisholm, later Lord Provost, was re-elected for Woodside.

Woodside (17th Ward) 3 seat Electorate: 7672 Spoiled votes: 63
Party	Candidate	Votes	%	±%
Re-elect Joint-ticket	Bailie Samuel Chisholm (incumbent)	3137		
Re-elect Joint-ticket	Bailie Winston Pettigrew (incumbent)	3024		
Re-elect Joint-ticket	Councillor D. M. Stevenson (incumbent)	2893		
Labour Co-op	Peter Glasse	1478		
'Popular Candidates'	Dr. Archibald Gunn	1318		
'Popular Candidates'	Alexander McLaughlan	1120		
'Popular Candidates'	Charles Tosh Grant	1075		
Majority				
Turnout				

== Notes ==
^α Thomson, Finlay, Morris, and Connell all ran as 'Progressive' candidates, however Finlay, Morris, and Connell ran on a joint-ticket claiming to be 'popular Progressive' candidates, who the electors knew due to their past service. Thomson ran a separate campaign claiming to be 'The Progressive candidate,' focusing on the issue of temperance.
^b Forsyth and Pringle ran as 'Workers' candidates, with a developed policy platform. This platform prioritised the establishment of a judicial rent commission to fix fair rents, and for the taxation of land values.
^c Whilst running on a 're-elect' basis, Osborne is cited elsewhere as a member of the Glasgow Conservative party.
