= 1896 United Kingdom local elections =

The 1896 United Kingdom local elections took place in late 1896 for municipal councils (including Urban Districts), as well as Rural districts. Municipal elections were held across England and Wales on Monday 2 November, with Scotland holding municipal elections the following day. Municipal elections in Ireland took place later that month, on Wednesday 25 November.

The English and Welsh election saw the main parties making inroads into municipal politics, although many contests took place on non-party political lines, with little reference to the candidates party affiliation. Across England and Wales Liberals gained 56 seats, Conservatives 32, Liberal Unionists 1, Independents 5, and Labour 3.

In Scotland the newly enlarged Glasgow Corporation saw a group of Progressive candidates, known as the Progressive Union, become the largest force on the council.

The Irish elections, particularly in Dublin, saw the ongoing battle between rival factions of Irish nationalists; the Redmondites and supporters of John Dillon and the Irish National Federation.

== Results ==
=== Municipal elections ===
Council	Previous control	Result
Birkenhead	Conservative	Conservative
Birmingham	No overall control	No overall control
Bolton	Conservative	Conservative
Bradford	No overall control	No overall control
Cardiff	No overall control	No overall control
Edinburgh	No overall control	Unionist
Glasgow	Independent	Progressive
Leeds	Conservative	Conservative
Leicester	Liberal	Liberal
Liverpool	Conservative	Conservative
Plymouth	Liberal	Liberal
Sheffield	No overall control	No overall control

=== District council elections ===
Council	Previous control	Result
Aberdare	Independent	Independent
