= Kidnapped in London =

Kidnapped in London

Kidnapped in London is an 1896 book by the Chinese revolutionary Sun Yat-sen about his abduction into the Chinese Legation in London and subsequent release.

== Background ==
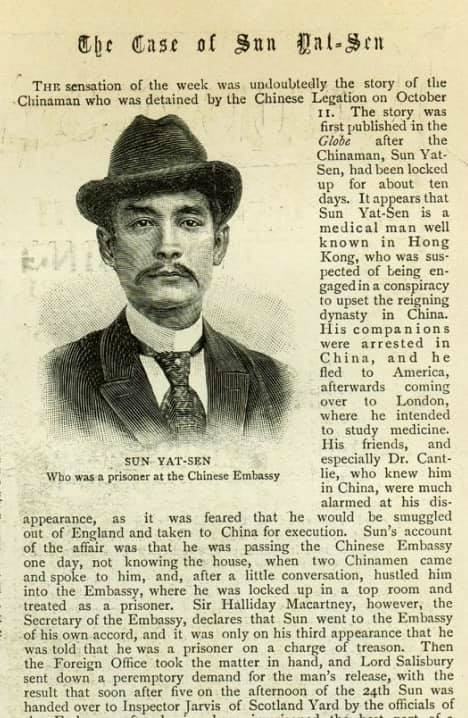
October 31, 1896, the Graphic's report on the release of Sun Yat-sen

After the failed Yiwei Guangzhou uprising in 1895, Sun Yat-sen was wanted by the Qing government. British Hong Kong was pressured by the Qing to deport him.

On September 23, 1896, Sun departed from New York aboard the White Star Line ship Majestic en route to the United Kingdom. He disembarked in Liverpool on the 30th. The Qing Government became aware of Sun's movement before his arrival and planned to abduct him and bring him back to China. It hired a private detective to monitor his activities.

On October 1, Sun visited his teacher, James Cantlie, who had taught him at the Hong Kong College of Medicine, at 46 Devonshire Street. Cantlie's residence was close to the Chinese Legation in London at 49 Portland Place, but the lack of flags or signage prevented Sun from recognizing the mission building.

On October 11, when Sun passed by the embassy again, he was taken inside the building. Over the next few days, all of Sun's attempts to pass information outside were unsuccessful. On October 17, Sun managed to persuade one of the Legation's housekeeper, Mrs. Howe, to deliver a note to the Cantlies. James Cantlie contacted Scotland Yard and the Foreign Office for help and submitted the story to the Times.

On October 22, The Globe first disclosed the abduction in an extra edition, sparking public interest. On the morning of October 23, the story of abduction appeared as the headline in major British newspapers. Pressure from the British Government and Scotland Yard forced Halliday McCartney, counsellor to the Chinese Legation, to release Sun. On the afternoon of October 23, Sun was released.

== Bibliography ==
- Wu, Zhenhuan (1981). 《孫中山全集》第一卷 ["The Complete Works of Sun Yat-sen" Volume 1]. 中華書局.
- Huang, Yuhe (1998). 孫逸仙倫敦蒙難真相：從未披露的史實 (in Chinese). 联经出版事业公司. ISBN 9570818182.
- Yat-sen Sun (1897). Kidnapped in London: Being the Story of My Capture By, Detention At, and Release from the Chinese Legation, London. London: Simpkin, Marshall, Hamilton, Kent and Company Limited.
- Luo, Jialun (1930). 中山先生倫敦蒙難史料之考訂 (in Chinese). Commercial Press.
- Cantlie, James (1912). Sun Yat Sen and the Awakening of China. Fleming H. Revell Company. ISBN 978-0-89875-354-7.
