= Yiwei Guangzhou uprising =

The Yiwei Guangzhou Uprising, also known as the First Guangzhou Uprising or the Yiwei Guangzhou Campaign, took place on the ninth day of the ninth month of the lunar calendar during the 21st year of the Guangxu era (1895). It was led by leaders of the Xingzhonghui, including Yang Quyun, Sun Yat-sen, Lu Haodong, and Zheng Shiliang. The Xingzhonghui planned to seize Guangzhou in one swift strike, raise the flag designed by Lu Haodong—featuring the Blue Sky and White Sun—over the governor's office of the two Guangdong provinces, and then march northward, passing through Hunan and Hubei, to attack Beijing. However, the plans were leaked, and Lu Haodong was captured and executed by the Qing government, becoming the first martyr of the Republican Revolution. Sun Yat-sen, who narrowly escaped, also was wanted by the Qing authorities. He fled to Japan, then to Hawaii, the United States, and the United Kingdom.

== Background ==
After the Meiji Restoration, Japan's national power gradually strengthened, and it sought further expansion, actively invading Korea. The First Sino-Japanese War (1894–1895) began on 25 July 1894. The first phase, from 25 July to 17 September, focused mainly on land battles, such as the Battle of Pyongyang on the Korean Peninsula, while the naval battles were primarily fought in the Yellow Sea. The second phase, from 17 September to 22 November, was mainly land-based, with the battlefield located on the Liaodong Peninsula. There were differing opinions within the Qing court regarding Japan's invasion of Korea. Emperor Guangxu advocated for war, Li Hongzhang supported peace, and Empress Dowager Cixi was indecisive, believing that "war is better than peace." As a result, when the Japanese army advanced, the Qing court hastily prepared for war, leading to a disastrous defeat. In his "London Memorial," Sun Yat-sen wrote, "Recently, Japan ordered its generals to send troops to invade our territory, and except for the people in the war zones, few knew of the opening of hostilities between China and Japan."

In early 1894, Sun spent more than 10 days in the countryside drafting "Li Hongzhang's Ten Thousand Words Book", advocating that "the great scripture of prosperity and the foundation of governing the country" lies in "people can make the best use of their talents, the land can make the best use of it, and things can make the best use of it" Use it, and the goods can flow smoothly. In mid-June, he abandoned his medical career and, together with Lu Haodong, went to Tianjin to submit a petition to Li Hongzhang. He then traveled to Beijing and Wuhan to observe the situation. In October, Sun Zhi traveled from Shanghai to Honolulu via Japan.

On 24 November 1894, Sun raised funds on Oahu Island, Honolulu，He founded the Xingzhonghui (Revive China Society). He put forward the slogan "Revive China" and the goal of "Expel the Manchu, restore China, and establish a united government." Liu Xiang, the manager of Yonghe Tai Trading Company, and He Kuan, the Chinese manager of the Bank of Bishop and Co., Ltd., were the first president and vice president, respectively. However, not long after, Liu Xiang withdrew from the Xingzhonghui.

== Preparation ==
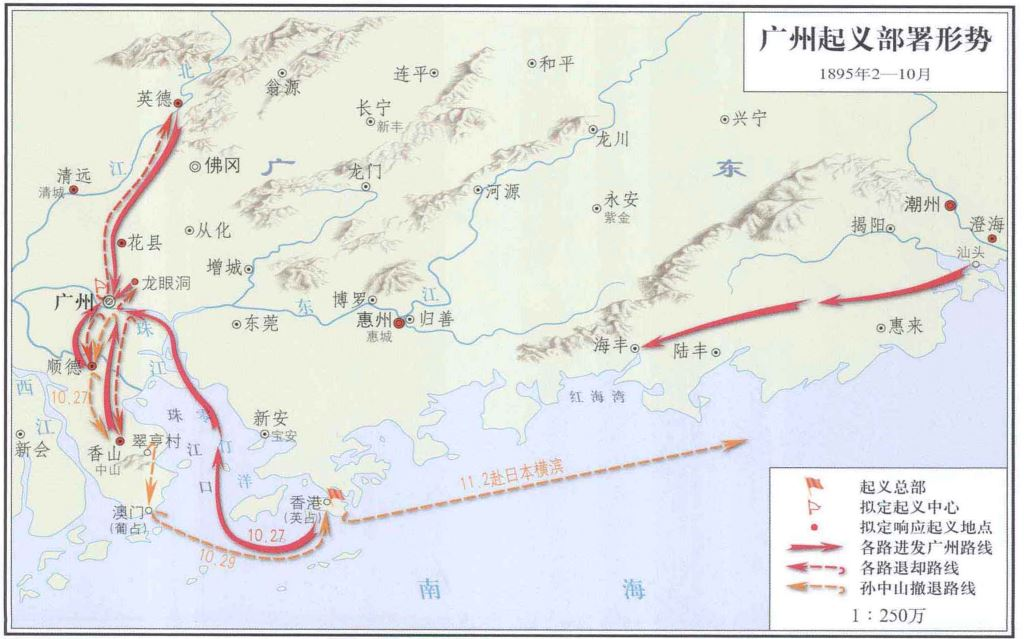
广州起义部署形势图Guangzhou Uprising Deployment Map

In the winter of 1894, Sun Yat-sen, accompanied by Deng Yin-nan, Sun Mei, and others, set out for China with over 6,000 US dollars in funds. They began preparing for an uprising, and a small group of Xingzhonghui worker members, along with technicians and military officers from Europe and America, also returned with him.

In January 1895, Sun Yat-sen, along with Deng Yin-nan and other comrades, returned to Hong Kong to plan the revolution. The Xingzhonghui was established at 13 St.Staunton Street, Central, Hong Kong, with "Qianheng Trading Company" as a cover. The name "Qianheng" was chosen by Huang Yongshang. Huang's father, Huang Sheng, was a member of the Hong Kong Legislative Council and was related to the prominent barrister Ho Qi. It was through Ho's introduction that Huang became acquainted with Sun Yat-sen, and subsequently, Huang joined the society. On the same day, the Xingzhonghui in Hong Kong merged with the Hong Kong Furen Literary Society, retaining the name "Xingzhonghui." The position of president (or chief representative) remained undecided. Various tasks and activities were immediately launched. Sun Yat-sen was in charge of leading the offensive at the front, while Yang was responsible for supporting operations at the rear.“"Yang and others were primarily responsible for gaining support from the British Hong Kong authorities.""Mainly, it was Huang Yongshang and Yu Yuzhi who provided the support, while Yang Quyun held the economic power of the uprising." In order to gain support and recognition from international powers, Sun Yat-sen attempted to make contact with Japan before the uprising. In 1895, through the introduction of Dr. James Cantlie, a British physician, Sun met Japanese businessman Shōkichi Umeya. During their conversation, Sun discussed plans to launch an uprising in Guangzhou and mentioned: "People in Europe and America call China the 'Sleeping Lion.' If it is a lion, it must wake up to be of any use. If the current situation continues, China will be divided by the colonial powers of Western Europe. Not only China, but all Asian countries will become slaves of Western Europe. Although China and Japan are unfortunately at war, we must unite to save China from the danger of colonization. This is the first step in defending Asia. To save China, my comrades and I are preparing for a revolution to overthrow the Qing Dynasty." In response, Meioka Shōkichi expressed his willingness to help and said, "If you raise an army, I will assist financially." Soon after, Meioka provided funds for Sun Yat-sen and sent people to Macau, Singapore, and Xiamen to purchase weapons. under its contact，On 1 March, Sun Yat-sen went to the Japanese consulate in Hong Kong, hoping that Consul Nakagawa Tetsujirō would help the Xingzhonghui acquire weapons to address the current shortages of funds and arms. However, after carefully listening to Sun Yat-sen's plans, Nakagawa Tetsujirō was not optimistic about the prospects.

On 4 March, Nakagawa Tetsujirō mentioned in a letter to Hara Kei, Director of the Commercial Bureau of the Japanese Ministry of Foreign Affairs:

"On the 1st of this month, through an introduction by a friend, a Chinese man named Sun Wen (a Western doctor) visited the consulate. As reported previously, this person intends to overthrow the current government. He is roughly the same age as I am, speaks English, and is possibly a Christian. It is said that he planned to act immediately after the grand naval exercises of the Beiyang Fleet last year but unfortunately missed the opportunity. However, up to this day, especially in Guangdong province, his faction is under serious scrutiny, making it difficult for him to act. More importantly, they currently lack weapons, needing 25,000 rifles and 1,000 pistols, and are seeking help to procure them. I responded that, due to my position, I only deal with matters related to commerce and trade, and have no involvement in politics, so it is very difficult. However, I admire their intentions and sincerely support their cause. I first want to know their goals and methods.

The man replied: 'Our group is called the Xingzhonghui (Revive China Society), which aims to revive China. Among the members, there are many "brothers" (a term for comrades), and the number of members is difficult to state. The reason is that any action would immediately be detected, and once the decision to act is made, communication among members becomes impossible. However, once we start, we believe there will be a widespread response.' When asked who would be president if they were successful, he replied that they had not yet considered that. If promised the weapons mentioned earlier, they would immediately begin recruiting members." On 17 April, Nakagawa Tetsujirō wrote in a letter:

"Sun Wen still visits the consulate frequently, insisting that our country offer support, but there has never been any connection between him and us. He never discusses internal matters, nor the number of members, and there is no sign of preparation for action. Sun Wen said he had devised a plan to transport weapons from near the docks, and that with some support from our country, he would be able to launch his movement. His admiration for bandits as heroes and heroes as righteous men reminded me of my feelings when reading *Water Margin*. In short, what Sun Wen and his group are saying about establishing an independent republic in the Guangdong and Guangxi regions is nothing more than a castle in the air." The general headquarters of the Xingzhonghui was established in Hong Kong. On 16 March, at the first meeting of the leadership, it was decided to first capture Guangzhou, and the flag of the uprising army, designed by Lu Haodong, was chosen to be the Blue Sky with a White Sun flag. Around 16 March, Sun Yat-sen met with Count Knappe, the German consul in Hong Kong.

== Uprising ==
After Sun Yat-sen arrived in Guangzhou, he established the Nongxuehui (Agricultural Society) as an organization and began recruiting comrades, setting the Double Ninth Festival (26 October) as the date for the uprising. In early October 1895, the Hong Kong police received a tip-off, claiming that members of the Triad Society were recruiting strong men to go to Guangzhou. Zhu Guiquan, along with his brother Zhu and Qiu Sisheng, were recruiting strong men, offering a monthly salary of 10 yuan to each recruit. Zhu Guiquan's brother recruited 400 coolies, and he went ahead of them. The strong men were led by Zhu Guiquan himself. On the ninth day of the ninth month in the lunar calendar, Sun Yat-sen, leading fellow members of the Xingzhonghui such as Zheng Shiliang and Lu Haodong, prepared for the Yimei Uprising in Guangzhou. However, due to the leakage of the plan, and with the supplies failing to arrive in time, the uprising ended in failure. Sun Yat-sen raised two armies in Shantou and along the Xijiang River, while simultaneously advancing towards Guangzhou. The two armies were scheduled to march towards Guangzhou on a certain day in October 1895, one advancing from the southwest and the other from the northeast. Unexpectedly, as the members' deployment was nearly finalized, a secret telegram arrived, stating that the two armies from the southwest and northeast were blocked midway. Since the two armies could not advance, the forces for reinforcement were already isolated, and thus the plan for the uprising had failed. On 25 October, Zhu Xiang, using his brother Zhu Qi's name, surrendered to the arrest commissioner Li Jiazhuo. The revolutionaries had originally planned to take the night ferry from Hong Kong to Guangzhou on that day, but due to insufficient recruits, the plan was not carried out.

At the time of the uprising, the so-called "3,000-strong death squad," which was supposed to be the main force of the uprising, never made it from Hong Kong to Guangzhou. At 6 a.m., the leaders of various forces in Guangzhou arrived at the headquarters of the uprising at Wang's ancestral hall to await orders. Sun's forces had already gathered at the Guangzhou docks, waiting to welcome the ships coming from Hong Kong, to inspect the weapons, and to meet with their mercenary allies. Around 8 a.m. that day, Sun Yat-sen received a telegram from Yang Quyun saying, "The goods cannot come." At that time, the telegraph service was very slow, and receiving a message after two days was considered quite timely. After 8 a.m., it was decided to cancel the uprising, and the societies' members who had been stationed in ambush on the water and in the nearby areas, ready to respond, were dismissed. Sun replied to Yang Quyun's telegram, saying: "Do not bring the goods; wait for further instructions." At dusk, Chen Shaobai took the "Tai'an" on a night voyage back to Hong Kong, while Sun remained in Guangzhou to handle the aftermath. The arrest commissioner, Li Jiazhuo, planned to arrest Sun Yat-sen and sought instructions from the Governor of Liangguang, Tan Zhonglin. Tan Zhonglin, considering Sun to be a member of the church, instructed Li Jiazhuo not to act rashly. In the evening, Sun Yat-sen, accompanied by missionary Qu Fengchi, went together to the wedding banquet of Wang Chongguang, the son of Pastor Wang Yuchu from Henan. Li Jiazhuo, who had secretly sent his men to observe, arrived at the banquet but still did not dare to take action. Instead, he was playfully ridiculed by Sun.

On 27 October, Inspector Stanton learned that 400 fighters had arrived in Guangzhou on the "Bao'an" ship during the night and immediately sent a telegram to the Guangzhou government. The Viceroy of Liangguang instructed over 1,500 Qing soldiers to enter Guangzhou for a search and arrest operation, discovering the Nongxuehui, Wang's ancestral hall, and other related locations. Sun Yat-sen attended the Sunday service at the Gospel Hall of missionary Qu Fengchi in Henan, where he worshiped with congregants from both Hong Kong and local Guangzhou. After the service, Sun disguised himself in women's clothing and, under the cover of the congregation, evaded the searchers. He took a small private boat to Tangjiawan, where he switched to a sedan chair and traveled to Macau. Li Jiazhuo suddenly led a raid on the Wang's ancestral hall and the Nongxuehui at Shuangmendi, where he captured Lu Haodong, Cheng Huai, and Cheng Ci. Approximately 400 people, along with their weapons, had boarded the *SS Powan* on 27 October. Early in the morning on 28 October, the ship was intercepted by the county magistrate, who, with orders from the stationed military, successfully captured them. Unexpectedly, as the members' deployment was nearly finalized, a secret telegram arrived, stating that the two armies from the southwest and northeast had been blocked midway. Since the two armies could not advance, the forces for reinforcement were isolated, and the plan for the uprising had thus failed. As a precautionary measure, Sun Yat-sen decided to postpone the entire operation and disband the hired forces. Sun Yat-sen took a sedan chair and managed to escape to Macau, from where he then traveled on to Hong Kong.

According to the *Zhongshan City Xiaolan Town Chronicle*, Sun Yat-sen hid in Xiaolan Town, south of Guangzhou, on the night of 27 October. He was assisted by acquaintances such as Mai Yinwei, He Zuoqian, and Mai Duanfu. On the evening of 28 October, he took the water route from Xiaolan to Macau.

On 29 October, Sun Yat-sen took a ship from Macau and arrived in Hong Kong.

== Result ==
The uprising members, led by Lu Haodong and others, were arrested by the Qing government. On 7 November, most of the members, including Lu Haodong, were arrested and executed, while Sun Yat-sen was placed under arrest warrant. Qiu Si, Zhu Guiquan, and others were executed. Cheng Kuiguang suffered severe injuries from 600 military club strikes and later died, while Cheng Yaochen died of illness in prison. In November, Sun Yat-sen decisively changed his appearance and, along with Chen Shaobai and others, went to Japan. Soon after, he established a branch of the Xingzhonghui in Yokohama. Under pressure from the Qing government, the British Hong Kong authorities issued an order of expulsion, forbidding Sun Yat-sen from entering Hong Kong. The Hong Kong government ordered the expulsion of Sun Yat-sen, Yang Quyun, and Chen Shaobai, banning them from residing in Hong Kong for five years.

== Evaluation ==
Hu Hanmin, in *The Spirit of the First Uprising Carried Out by the Chief Executive*, stated: "It was because of this uprising by Dr. Sun that the Chinese people, who had been living in a drunken stupor, were awakened. This marks the beginning of a great national cause, the starting point for the restoration of freedom and equality for the Chinese nation, and it should occupy the most important and glorious page in the history of the revolution."

== See also ==
- Sun Yat-sen
