= 1896 Edinburgh Corporation election =

Local election in Scotland

Elections for Edinburgh Corporation were held on Tuesday 3 November 1896, alongside municipal elections across Scotland, and the wider British local elections. The election was relatively quiet, with no particularly important issues being raised, and contests took place in only 2 of the cities 13 wards, with candidates in the remaining 11 being returned unopposed.

The election followed the annexation of Portobello to Edinburgh, and the three new Portobello wards had to elect their initial representation. Contests took place in two of the three Portobello wards, with Portobello West and Portobello East seeing contests. Portobello would in total contribute 5 Unionist and 4 Liberal councillors. This gave the new council a slight Unionist majority.

== Ward results ==
=== Canongate ===
Canongate Spoiled papers: 4
Party	Candidate	Votes	%	±%
Liberal	Miller Dunlop (former councillor for ward)	862	60.11	
Labour	Thomas Blankie	572	39.89	
Majority		290	20.22	
Turnout		1,434		
Liberal hold		Swing		

=== Portobello West ===
Portobello West
Party	Candidate	Votes	%	±%
	Councillor Alfred Nichol (incumbent)	383		
	Councillor George Balfour (incumbent)	371		
Unionist	Mr William Gray	320		
	Mr John Shepherd	170		
Majority				
Turnout				
Councillor Nichol hold		Swing		
Councillor Balfour hold		Swing		
Gray gain from Retiring councillor				

=== Portobello East ===
Portobello East (16th) Spoiled papers: 8
Party	Candidate	Votes	%	±%
	Bailie David Grieve (incumbent)	302		
	Bailie R. Kellock (incumbent)	230		
Unionist	Mr James Watson	147		
	Councillor Alexander Clark (incumbent)	137		
Majority				
Turnout				
Bailie Grieve hold		Swing		
Bailie Kellock hold		Swing		
Watson gain from Councillor Clark				

=== St. Bernards ===
St. Bernards Spoiled papers: 11
Party	Candidate	Votes	%	±%
Liberal	Lang Todd (incumbent)	1,216	58.10	
Unionist	Forbes Dallas S.S.C.	877	41.90	
Majority		339	16.20	
Turnout		2,093		
Liberal hold		Swing		
