= John Ure Primrose =

Scottish merchant from 1902 to 1905

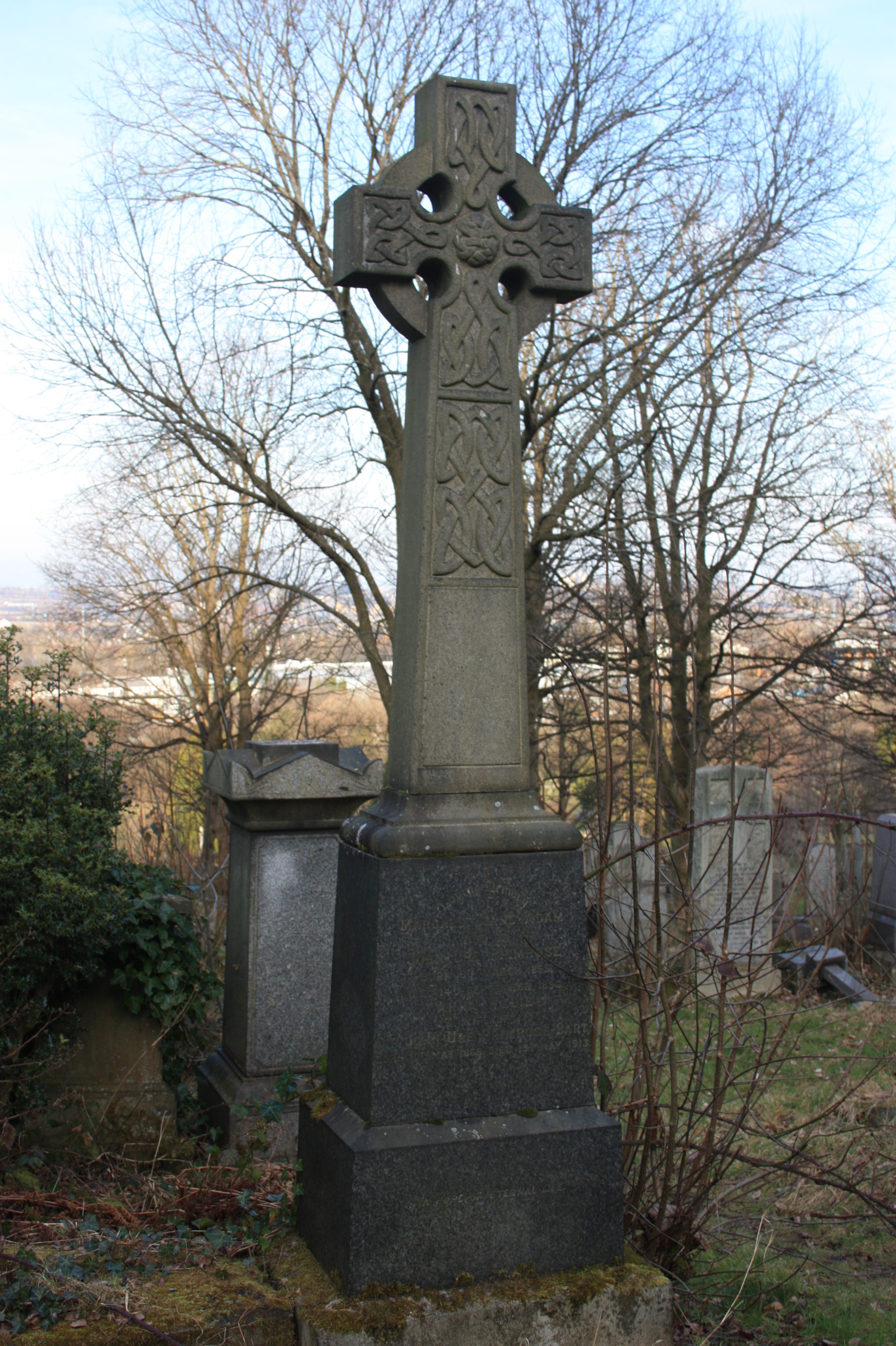
The grave of John Ure Primrose, Craigton Cemetery

Sir John Ure Primrose, 1st Baronet DL LLD (1847–1924) was a Scottish merchant who served as Lord Provost of Glasgow from 1902 to 1905 and as Chairman of Rangers Football Club from 1912 to 1923. He was also Chairman of the Clyde United Navigation Trust.

== Life ==
He was born in Glasgow on 6 October 1847 the son of William Primrose and his wife, Annie Ure, both from wealthy merchant-miller families. The family lived at 53 King Street in the Tradeston district.

He joined the family flour milling business of William Primrose & Co.

He died at his home, Redholme in Dumbreck, on 29 June 1924 and was buried in Craigton Cemetery in south-west Glasgow near Bellahouston Park. The grave lies in the dense area to the south. It is in the first inner row north of the south path, facing south onto his parents' grave.

== Politics ==
His politics were firmly Unionist/Conservative in outlook.

His first political role was as a member of Govan police Commission.

He became a town councillor in 1886 representing Kingston Ward. From 1891 he was a magistrate and from 1896 a senior magistrate, and was responsible for organising the new fire station at Ingram Street.

He was appointed Lord Provost of Glasgow in November 1902, replacing Sir Samuel Chisholm, 1st Baronet. His Private Secretary was John Smith Samuel.

He was created Baronet of Redholme, Dumbreck in the Parish of Govan, in the County of the City of Glasgow on the occasion of the visit of King Edward VII to Glasgow in 1903.

He was replaced as Lord Provost in 1905 by Sir William Bilsland.

== Rangers F C ==
Sir John became a member of Rangers Football Club in August, 1887, the month in which First Ibrox Park was opened. At the annual meeting in 1888, the future baronet but at that time Councillor Primrose, was elected Honorary President. He only vacated this office on becoming chairman some twenty-four years later.

When William Craig proposed Sir John as successor to James Henderson in 1912, he accepted on the condition it be an interim appointment. This interim appointment lasted for eleven years! A great believer in fair play, Sir John was a great supporter of the Glasgow Merchants Charity Cup, raising many thousands of pounds for institutions in Glasgow and the West of Scotland. A member

Sir John presided at the Club's Jubilee dinner held, a year late, on 9 April, 1923. He resigned from the chairmanship in July of that year.

== Family ==
Primrose married three times: firstly in 1877 to Margaret Jane Adam; secondly in 1887 to Joanna (Anna) Wylie; thirdly in 1915 to Muriel Pilling daughter of Edwin Pilling.

He had one child by his first marriage, William Louis Primrose, who became 2nd Baronet on his death.

His maternal uncle was John Ure, Lord Provost of Glasgow from 1880 to 1883.

Lady Joanna ("Anna") Ure Primrose (nee Wylie) was known as a philanthropist in her own right.

== Artistic depiction ==
He was portrayed in office by Arthur Stockdale Cope.

Baronetage of the United Kingdom
New creation	Baronet (of Redholme); 1903–1924	Succeeded by William Primrose
