= John Samuel =

John Samuel may refer to:

- John Samuel (rugby union), Welsh rugby union player
- John S. Samuel, United States Air Force general
- Sir John Smith Samuel, Scottish master of ceremonies

== See also ==
- Samuel John, Indian actor and theatre activist
