= Neil Cantlie =

Scottish Royal Army Medical Corps officer, biographer and historical writer

Cantlie in 1945.

Lieutenant-General Sir Neil Cantlie KCB KBE MC FRCS (1892–1975) was a Scottish Royal Army Medical Corps officer, known also as a biographer and historical writer. He served in World War I and World War II, and was Director-General Army Medical Services from 1948 to 1952.

== Life ==
He was the youngest son of James Cantlie, born 11 December 1892 in Hong Kong. He was educated at Robert Gordon's College, and entered Aberdeen University where he graduated MB ChB in 1914.

Cantlie joined the Royal Army Medical Corps (RAMC) in July 1914, with the rank of lieutenant. On the outbreak of World War I he was in the British Expeditionary Force in France, was wounded at the First Battle of Ypres, and was promoted captain in 1915. In January 1918 he was awarded the Military Cross.

In 1920 Cantlie became a Fellow of the Royal College of Surgeons, and was seconded to the Egyptian Army. He took part in the 1924 military action in Khartoum that followed the assassination of Lee Stack and resignation of Saad Zaghloul. That year he was promoted major.

Cantlie then gained surgical qualifications at the Royal Army Medical College, going on to take up military hospital positions. In 1935 he was promoted lieutenant-colonel. He was in Peshawar during the Waziristan campaign (1936–1939).

In 1939 Cantlie was running the surgery department at the Cambridge Military Hospital. After other hospital postings, and promotion as colonel in 1941, he joined the 46th Division as Assistant Director Medical Services, and served in Operation Torch. Promoted brigadier, he was with V Corps to 1944. Then, ranked major-general, he went as Deputy Director Medical Services to Eastern Command, India, for the rest of the war.

Returning to the United Kingdom in 1946, Cantlie was Deputy Director Medical Services, Southern Command to 1948. Then, with promotion to lieutenant-general, he was Director-General Army Medical Services from 1948 to 1952, retiring from the RAMC. He was honoured with the CB in 1946, KBE in 1949, and KCB in 1952; and was King's Honorary Surgeon from 1950 to 1952.

Sir Neil Cantlie died on 16 May 1975 in the Queen Alexandra Military Hospital, London.

== Works ==
In a 1923 paper with El Bimhashi, for Mongalla, Cantlie covered sexually transmitted diseases and yaws. With George Seaver, he wrote a biography of his father, Sir James Cantlie: A Romance in Medicine (1939). A History of the Army Medical Department (2 vols.) appeared in 1974.

== Family ==
Cantlie married in 1930 Alice Mary Irene Lucas, daughter of Rev. Robert Holmes Lucas (1873–1949), vicar of Yealmpton. They had one son, Colin.
