= John Smith Samuel =

Scottish master of ceremonies

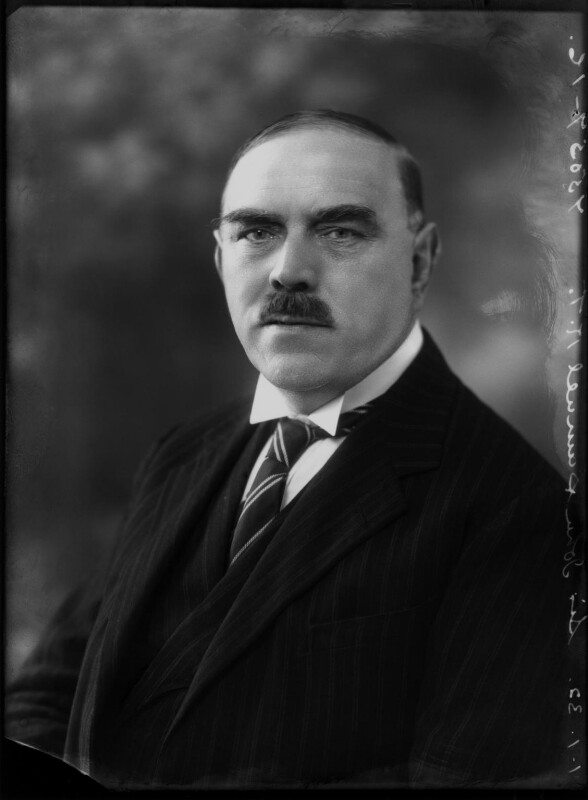
Samuel in 1932

Sir John Smith Samuel KBE FRSE, FSA (Scot.), DL, JP (1870 – November 1934) was a Scottish local government official. He was ceremonial secretary to the Glasgow Corporation and private secretary to successive Lords Provost of Glasgow for 38 years.

== Life ==
He was born on 2 April 1870.

In 1902 he was elected a Fellow of the Royal Society of Edinburgh. His proposers were Magnus Maclean, John Glaister, James Dalrymple Duncan Dalrymple and John Horne.

From 1903 he served as Secretary to John Ure Primrose. At that time he lived at 8 Park Avenue.

He then consecutively served Sir William Bilsland, Sir Archibald McInnes Shaw, Daniel Macaulay Stevenson, Sir Thomas Dunlop, Sir James Stewart, Sir Thomas Paxton, Sir David Mason and Sir Thomas Kelly.

He died in a nursing home in Glasgow on 10 November 1934 following a brief spell of influenza.
