= Frederick Robertson (English cricketer) =

English cricketer

Frederick Marrant Robertson (1843 – 28 March 1920) was an English first-class cricketer active 1871–80 who played for Surrey. He was born in Cape Town; died in Kensington.
