= Steven Bilsland, 1st Baron Bilsland =

British businessman (1892-1970)

Baron Bilsland in 1950.

Captain Alexander Steven Bilsland, 1st Baron Bilsland, KT, MC (13 September 1892 – 10 December 1970), known as Sir Steven Bilsland, Bt, between 1921 and 1950, was a Scottish businessman and public servant.

== Life ==
Bilsland was the eldest surviving son of Sir William Bilsland, 1st Baronet, Lord Provost of Glasgow, and his wife, Agnes Anne Steven, daughter of Alexander Steven, of Provanside, Glasgow. He was the brother-in-law of Lord Clydesmuir. He was educated at St John's College, Cambridge. He was head of Bilsland Brothers Ltd, bakers, of Glasgow, founded by his uncle James Bilsland. He was also chairman of the Scottish National Trust Ltd. Bilsland succeeded his father in the baronetcy in 1921. In November 1938 he was appointed Honorary Colonel of the newly formed 8th Battalion Cameronians (Scottish Rifles) (57th Searchlight Regiment) (having previously served as a captain in the old 8th Battalion). In 1950 he was elevated to the peerage as Baron Bilsland, of Kinrara in the County of Inverness, in recognition of his "...public services in Scotland". He was further honoured in 1955 when he was made a Knight of the Thistle.

Lord Bilsland married Amy Janet Colville, daughter of David Colville JP, of Jerviston House, Motherwell, Lanarkshire, in 1922. They had no children. He died in December 1970, aged 78, when the baronetcy and barony became extinct.

== Arms ==
Coat of arms of Steven Bilsland, 1st Baron Bilsland
Crest A bull's head erased Sable horned Gules. Escutcheon Argent on a fess Azure between two bulls' heads erased Sable horned Gules in chief and a mascle of the last in base a salmon on its back holding a ring in its mouth Proper. Motto Certum Pete Finem (Aim at a Sure End) Orders The Most Ancient and Most Noble Order of the Thistle.

Baronetage of the United Kingdom
Preceded by William Bilsland	Baronet (of Park Circus); 1921–1970	Extinct
Peerage of the United Kingdom
New creation	Baron Bilsland; 1950–1970	Extinct
