= Baron Bilsland =

Extinct barony in the Peerage of the United Kingdom

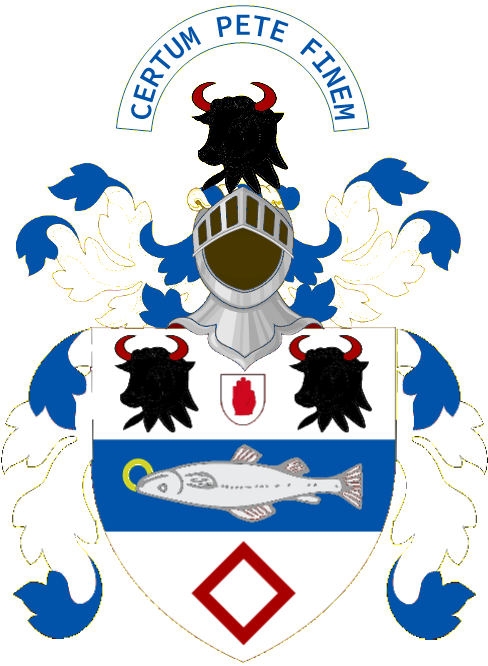
- Crest: A bull's head erased Sable horned Gules.
- Shield: Argent on a fess Azure between two bulls' heads erased Sable horned Gules in chief and a mascle of the last in base a salmon on its back holding a ring in its mouth Proper.
- Motto: Certum Pete Finem (Aim At A Sure End)

Baron Bilsland, of Kinrara in the County of Inverness, was a title in the Peerage of the United Kingdom. It was created on 31 January 1950 for Sir Steven Bilsland, 2nd Baronet, head of Bilsland Brothers Ltd, bakers, of Glasgow. The titles became extinct on his death on 10 December 1970. The Baronetcy, of Park Circus in the City of Glasgow, was created in the Baronetage of the United Kingdom on 25 November 1907 for William Bilsland, a partner of Bilsland Brothers, founded by his brother James Bilsland, and Lord Provost of Glasgow from 1905 to 1908. He was succeeded by his only surviving son, the aforementioned second Baronet, who was elevated to the peerage in 1950.

== Bilsland baronets, of Park Circus (1907) ==
- Sir William Bilsland, 1st Baronet (1847–1921)
- Sir (Alexander) Steven Bilsland, 2nd Baronet (1892–1970) (created Baron Bilsland in 1950)

== Barons Bilsland (1950) ==
- (Alexander) Steven Bilsland, 1st Baron Bilsland (1892–1970)

Baronetage of the United Kingdom
Preceded by Ashman baronets	Bilsland baronets of Park Circus; 25 November 1907	Succeeded by Colman baronets
