= Arthur Robert Adams =

British lawyer and colonial administrator (1861-1937)

Portrait by Walter Stoneman, 1921

Sir Arthur Robert Adams KBE (13 December 1861 – 3 April 1937) was a British lawyer and colonial administrator who spent his career in the Straits Settlements.

== Early life and education ==
Adams was born on 13 December 1861, the son of Robert Adams of Sherborne, Dorset. He was educated at Sherborne School and Foster’s School, Sherborne. He was admitted as a solicitor in England in 1884.

== Career ==
Adams went to Penang to practise as a lawyer and advocate, and was admitted to the Bar of the Straits Settlements in 1887. Later, he was also admitted to the Federated Malay States Bar in 1898, and the Johor Bar in 1917. From 1891, he was the Municipal Commissioner in Penang. He served as Unofficial Member of the Legislative Council, Straits Settlements from 1907-1919 and Senior Unofficial Member from 1915-1919. On several occasions he acted as Solicitor-General of the Colony. He acted as legal counsel for the government in Tanjong Pagar Arbitration in 1905.

Adams was Commandant of the Penang Volunteers from 1899-1919. He was mobilised in 1914 and during the First World War was mentioned in despatches. He rose to the rank of lieutenant colonel commanding troops in Penang, and was Second in Command, Straits Settlements and Federated Malay States. Adams was a Fellow of the Royal Colonial Institute. In 1920, he became a founder member of the Association of British Malaya, successor to the Straits Settlements Association.

In 1923, Adams retired to Swanage, England where he served as a magistrate and legal adviser. He served as vice-chairman of the Swanage Urban District Council and vice-president of the R.N.L.I.

== Personal life and death ==
Adams married Hilda Isabel Jones in 1891. He was a keen Freemason who rose to Deputy Grand Master in 1910, the second highest office in Malaya. Adams died in Swanage on 3 April 1937..

Sir Robert Arthur Adams had 7 children, including Hugh Adams and John Adams. Both served in the army abroad. Hugh Adams has a well recorded war record in Britain serving in Asia, whilst John Septimus Adams born in 1903 served in Kenya, and later bought a flower farm, living in Africa for many years until his retirement. John Adams had two sons, Robert Adams, an English landscape architect who has worked on historical gardens in England and George Adams, a pilot. Both sons were educated in England.

== Honours ==
In 1918, Adams was made Knight Commander of the Order of the British Empire (KBE).
