= Frederick Robertson (judge) =

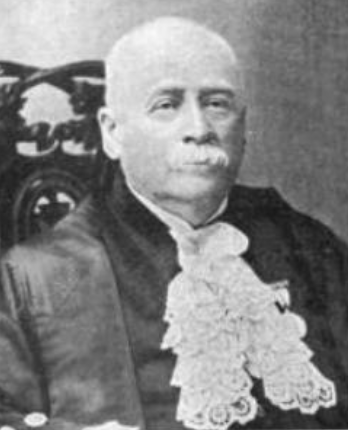
- Born: Frederick Alexander Robertson; 28 February 1854
- Died: 20 December 1918 (aged 64); London, England
- Education: King's College London
- Occupations: Jurist, academic administrator

Sir Frederick Alexander Robertson KBE (28 February 1854 – 20 December 1918) was a judge and academic administrator. He was educated at King's College London. He joined service and arrived in Punjab, India as Settlement Officer and Assistant Commissioner in 1876 and on special duty in connection with Settlement operations in Maler Kotla, 1888. He became the Director, Land Records and Agriculture in 1889; Divisional Judge in 1896; Temporary Additional Judge, Chief Court, Punjab in 1902 but confirmed in 1904. He served as a puisne judge in Punjab, India and as vice-chancellor of the Punjab University from 1909 to 1910. He was also a lecturer on Mahomedan Law at the Imperial Institute. His publications are Customary Law of Rawalpindi district; also reports on the revised Settlement; and Forest Settlement of that District .

He died in London on 20 December 1918.
