= William Bilsland =

Scottish baker

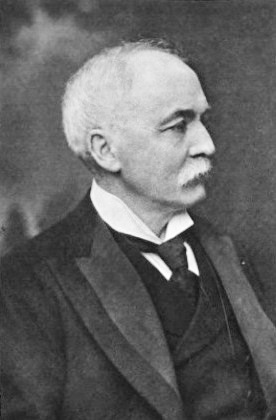
Sir William Bilsland

Sir William Bilsland LLD (17 March 1847 – 27 August 1921) was a Scottish baker who owned one of Scotland's largest bakeries, and was Lord Provost of Glasgow. He was an elder of the United Free Church of Scotland and a supporter of the temperance movement.

== Life ==
He was born on 17 March 1847 at Ballat near Balfron, the son of Ann Blair and James Bilsland, a farmer.

He was educated at Dalmanoch school in Bonhill living there with his uncle, Dr Alexander Leckie.

From 1860 to 1869 he worked as a grocer's assistant in Glasgow. In 1869 he opened a shop at 223 Garscube Road. In 1872 he opened a bakery in Greenhill Street and also acquired an existing bakery in Elderslie Street.

== Bilsland Brothers ==
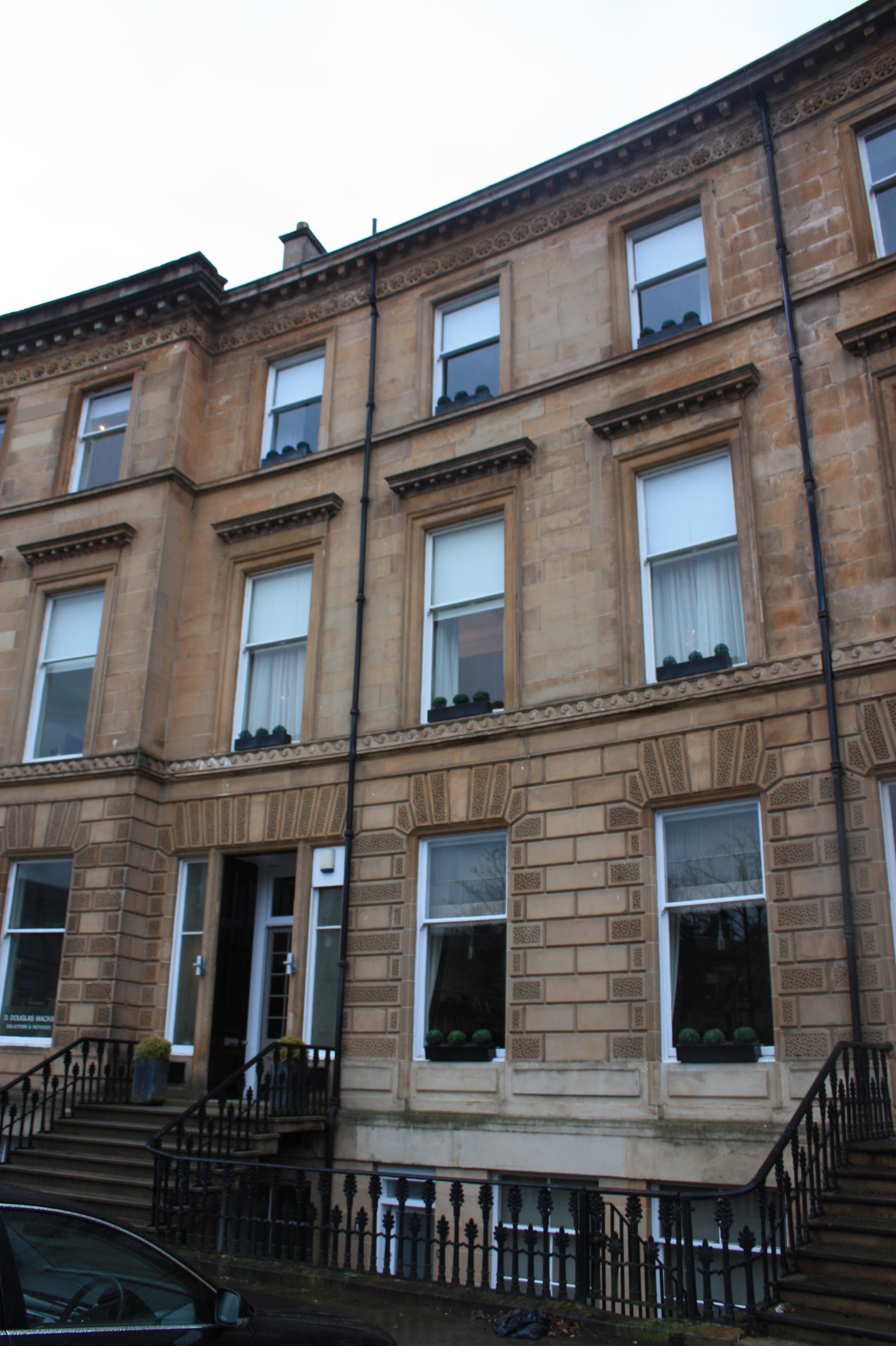
28 Park Circus, Glasgow

In 1877, with his brothers, he bought a large piece of ground on Hydepark Street and on which they built the large Hydepark Bakery, adopting the company name of Bilsland Brothers.

By 1900 they employed 200 people and made 230,000 loaves of bread a week, over 10 million loaves per year. They supplied 1600 retailers. Workers were well-paid, worked a 40-hour maximum week, unusual for the time, and all received free bread.

In 1912 they acquired the rival company of Gray and Dunn (but retained their name as Gray Dunn & Co). The main company was rebranded as Glasgow Bakeries.

The company traded until 1985. The bakery was demolished in 2015.

== Politics ==
In 1886 he became a town councillor representing the 13th ward (Anderston) in Glasgow.

In 1905 he was elected Lord Provost, succeeding John Ure Primrose. As Lord Provost, he was the Lord Lieutenant for the City of Glasgow. He served until 1908 during which time he saw many artistic projects, in particular the Kelvingrove Art Gallery and Museum. During this period he lived at 28 Park Circus a beautiful, three-storey Georgian circus form, just east of Kelvingrove Park.

In 1907 King Edward VII created him a baronet, as Sir William Bilsland, Baronet of Park Circus, for his services to Glasgow. He was appointed a Deputy Lieutenant of Lanarkshire in 1907.

He was a trustee of the National Galleries of Scotland for three 5-year terms from 1907.

He died on 27 August 1921.

== Family ==
In 1885 he married Agnes Anne Steven (d.1935). Together they had two children, Agnes Anne (1896-1970) and Steven Bilsland, who inherited the business on his death.

== Arms ==
Coat of arms of William Bilsland
Crest A bull's head erased Sable horned Gules. Escutcheon Argent on a fess Azure between two bulls' heads erased Sable horned Gules in chief and a mascle of the last in base a salmon on its back holding a ring in its mouth Proper. Motto Certum Pete Finem (Aim At A Sure End)

Baronetage of the United Kingdom
New creation	Baronet (of Park Circus); 1907–1921	Succeeded by Steven Bilsland
