= James Cantlie =

British doctor (1851–1926)

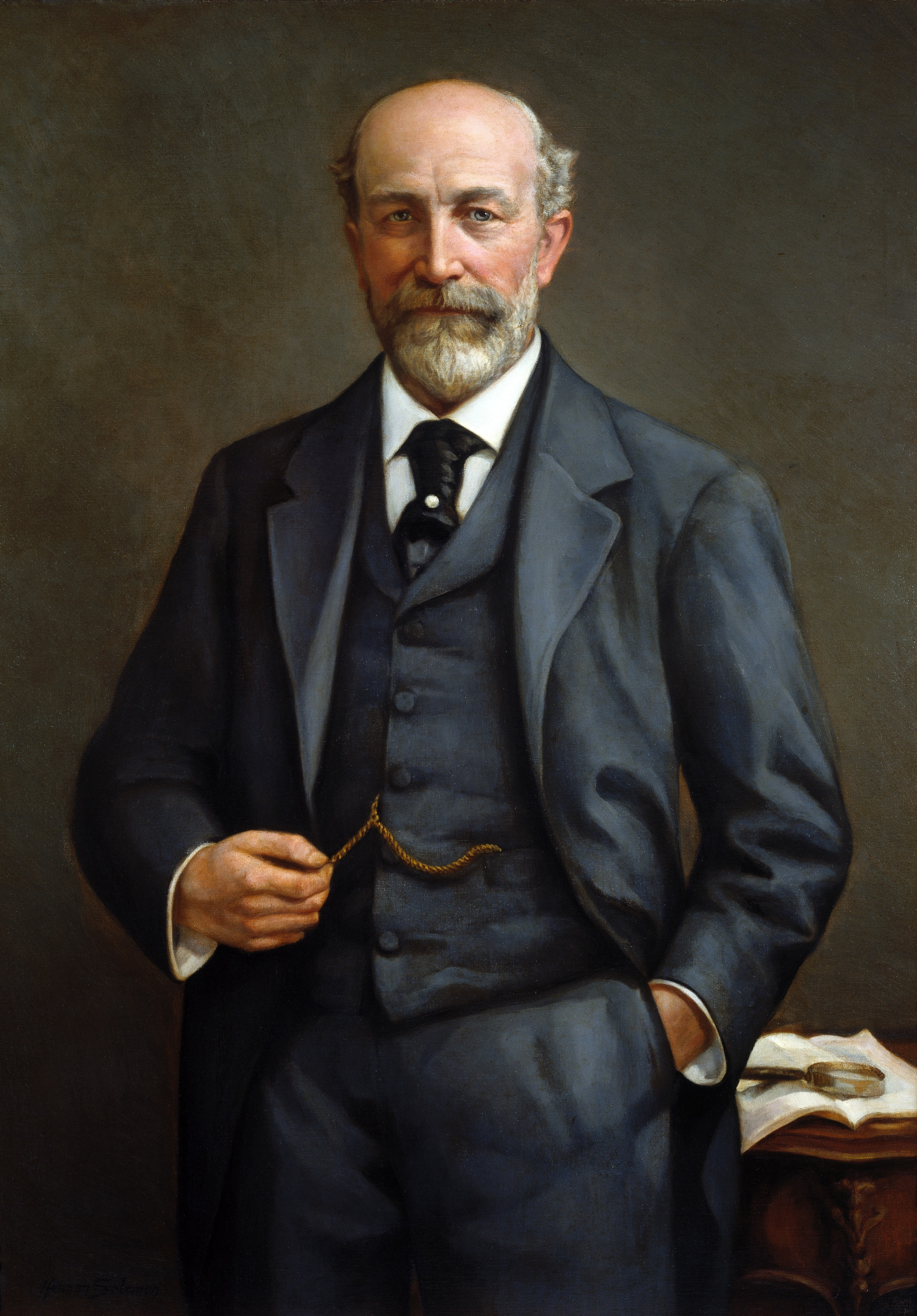
James Cantlie by Herman Solomon, c. 1925

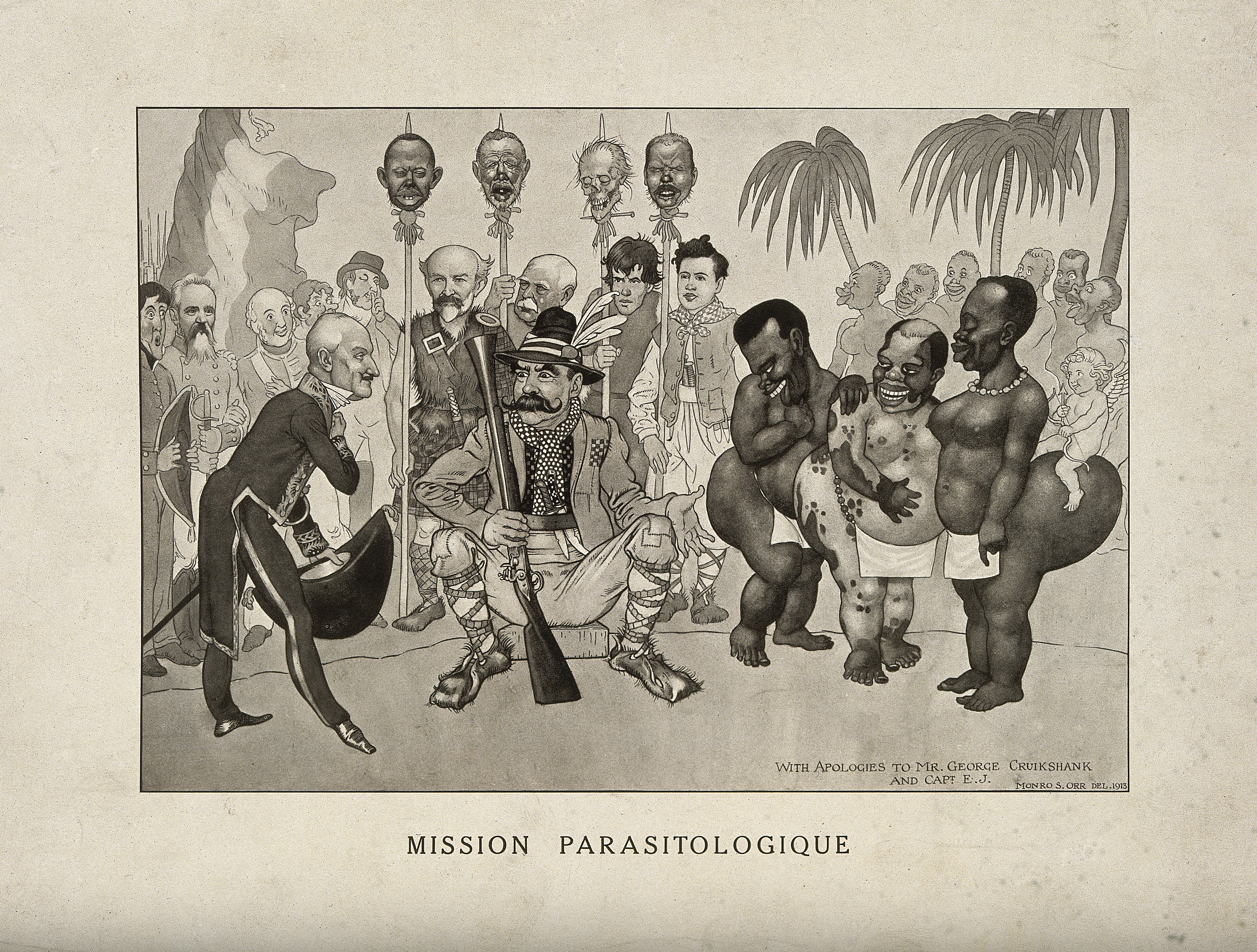
Caricature: A hunter offering a French gentleman three 'hottentot'

Sir James Cantlie KBE FRCS KStJ (17 January 1851 – 28 May 1926) was a British physician. He was a pioneer of first aid, which in 1875 was unknown: even the police had no knowledge of basic techniques such as how to stop serious bleeding and applying splints. He was also influential in the study of tropical diseases and in the debates concerning degeneration theory.

== Life ==
Cantlie was born in Banffshire and took his first degree at Aberdeen University, carrying out his clinical training at Charing Cross Hospital, London.

In 1877, Cantlie became a Fellow of the Royal College of Surgeons and Assistant Surgeon to Charing Cross Hospital.

In 1883, Cantlie and eleven other civilian doctors and six army regulars volunteered to serve in Egypt. Before going to Egypt, Cantlie was engaged to Mabel Barclay Brown (died 1921). Brown's father also volunteered with the London Scottish. They got married in 1884 and had four sons.

In 1886 he became Surgeon at Charing Cross. In 1888, he resigned to take up a position in Hong Kong. While in the crown colony, he co-founded the Hong Kong College of Medicine for Chinese, which later grew into the University of Hong Kong. One of his first pupils at the college was the future Chinese leader Dr. Sun Yat-sen. Cantlie's work in Hong Kong included investigations into leprosy and into various tropical diseases; in 1894 he encountered an outbreak of plague.

In 1896, poor health – related to his unstinting work as a researcher and practicing physician – forced Cantlie to return to London. Later that year, Dr. Sun visited him, and was kidnapped by the Imperial Chinese secret service.

Sun was tied up in the Chinese Legation, and might well have been shipped back to China and executed had it not been for Cantlie, who led a media campaign which not only succeeded in releasing Dr. Sun, but made him a hero in Britain.

Cantlie was involved in the setting up of the Journal of Tropical Medicine in 1898, and the founding of the London School of Tropical Medicine in 1899. He was a founder in 1907 of the Royal Society of Tropical Medicine and Hygiene.

He was a long-time officer of the Volunteer Force, as a surgeon-captain in the 7th Middlesex (London Scottish) Volunteer Rifle Corps, and received the Volunteer Officers' Decoration on 6 February 1903. During the early years of the twentieth century, and particularly during the First World War (1914–1919), Cantlie's work centred on the provision and training of ambulance services.

On his death, he was buried in St John the Baptist church, located in Cottered, Herts.

He is the father of four sons: Sir Keith Cantlie Kt, CIE (1886-1977) - knighted for his work for the Assam Revenue Tribual; Lieutenant General Sir Neil Cantlie KCB, KBE, MC, FRCS (1892-1975); Lieutenant Colonel Kenneth Cantlie (1899-1986) - railway expert and recipient of the Order of the Brilliant Jade for his work in China; and, Admiral Sir Colin Cantlie KBE, CB, DSC (1888-1967), as well as great-grandfather of John Cantlie.

== See also ==
- Cantlie line
