= Sun Yat-sen =

Chinese revolutionary and statesman (1866–1925)

Father of the Nation (Note: Chinese: 國父; pinyin: Guófù); Great Pioneer of the Democratic Revolution (Note: Chinese: 民主革命的偉大先驅; pinyin: Mínzhǔ gémìng de wěidà xiānqū); Sun Yat-sen
- 孫逸仙
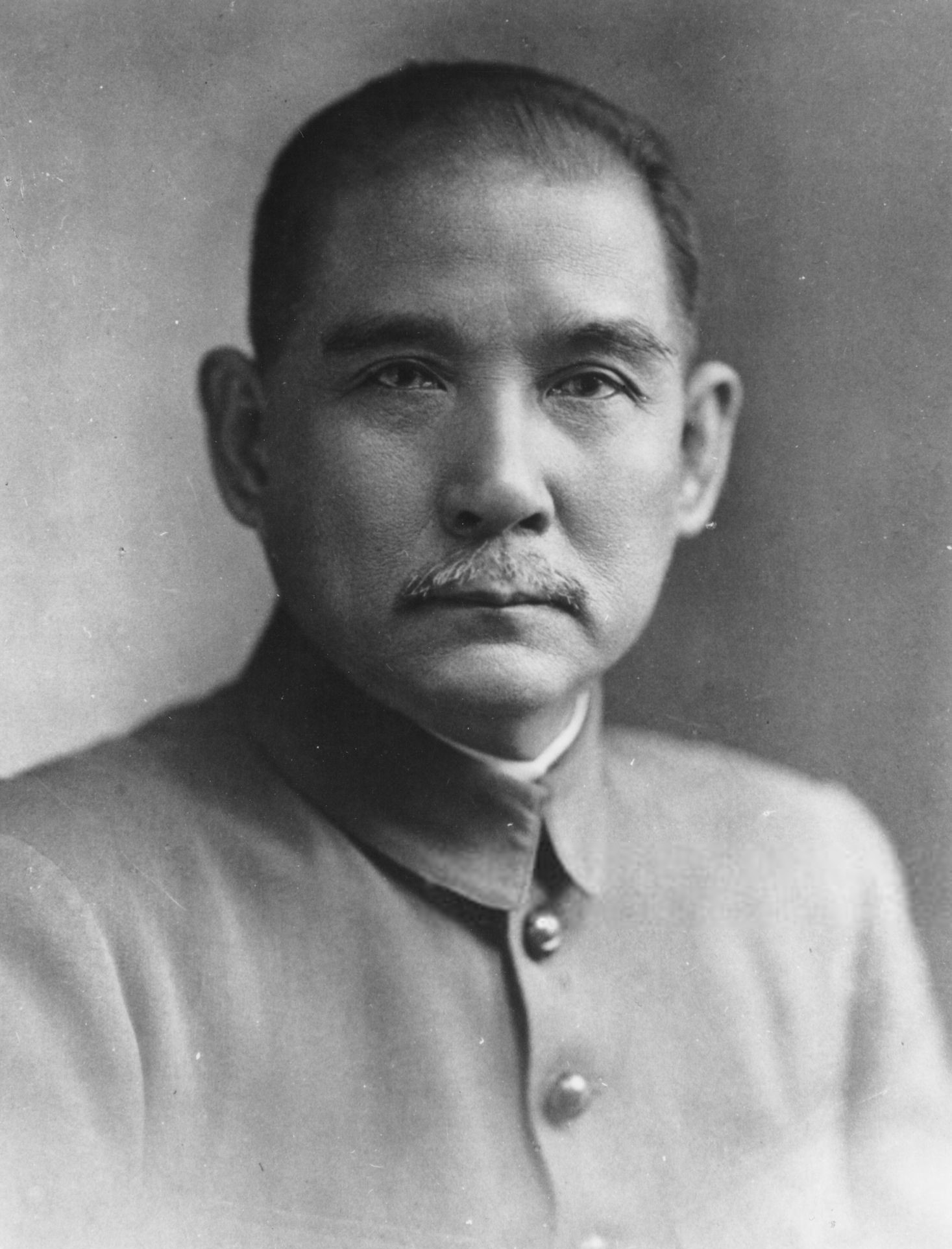
- Sun in 1922

1st Provisional President of the Republic of China
- In office 1 January 1912 – 10 March 1912
- Vice President: Li Yuanhong
- Preceded by: Office established (Puyi as Emperor)
- Succeeded by: Yuan Shikai

Premier of the Kuomintang
- In office 10 October 1919 – 12 March 1925
- Preceded by: Office established
- Succeeded by: Zhang Renjie (as chairman)

Personal details
- Born: Sun Te-ming; 12 November 1866 Cuiheng, Guangdong, China
- Died: 12 March 1925 (aged 58) Beijing, China
- Resting place: Sun Yat-sen Mausoleum
- Party: Kuomintang
- Other political affiliations: Tongmenghui; Revive China Society
- Spouses: Lu Muzhen (m. 1885; div. 1915) Kaoru Otsuki (m. 1905; a. 1906) Soong Ching-ling (m. 1915)
- Domestic partners: Chen Cuifen (concubine, 1892–1925); Haru Asada (concubine, 1897–1902)
- Children: 4, including Sun Fo
- Parent: Madame Yang (mother)
- Education: Hong Kong College of Medicine for Chinese (MD)
- Profession: Physician
- Signature (Chinese)

Military service
- Branch/service: Republic of China Army
- Years of service: 1917–1925
- Rank: Dayuanshuai
- Battles/wars: 1911 Revolution; Second Revolution; Constitutional Protection Movement; Guangdong–Guangxi War; Warlord Era
- Sun Yat-sen's voice On the Three Principles of the People; Recorded in Guangzhou on 30 May 1924

Common name in English
- Traditional Chinese: 孫逸仙
- Simplified Chinese: 孙逸仙
- Hanyu Pinyin: Sūn Yìxiān
- Jyutping: Syun1 Jat6-sin1
Transcriptions
Standard Mandarin
- Hanyu Pinyin: Sūn Yìxiān
- Bopomofo: ㄙㄨㄣ ㄧˋ ㄒㄧㄢ
- Wade–Giles: Sun^{1} Yi^{4}-hsien^{1}
- Tongyong Pinyin: Sun Yì-sian
- IPA: [swə́n î.ɕjɛ́n]
Yue: Cantonese
- Yale Romanization: Syūn Yaht-sīn
- Jyutping: Syun1 Jat6-sin1
- Hong Kong Romanisation: Suen Yat-sin
- IPA: [syn˥ jɐt̚˨ sin˥]
Southern Min
- Hokkien POJ: Sun E̍k-sian

Common name in Chinese
- Traditional Chinese: 孫中山
- Simplified Chinese: 孙中山
- Hanyu Pinyin: Sūn Zhōngshān
- Jyutping: Syun1 Zung1-saan1
Transcriptions
Standard Mandarin
- Hanyu Pinyin: Sūn Zhōngshān
- Bopomofo: ㄙㄨㄣ ㄓㄨㄥ ㄕㄢ
- Wade–Giles: Sun^{1} Chung^{1}-shan^{1}
- Tongyong Pinyin: Sun Jhong-shan
- IPA: [swə́n ʈʂʊ́ŋ.ʂán]
Yue: Cantonese
- Yale Romanization: Syūn Jūng sāan
- Jyutping: Syun1 Zung1-saan1
- IPA: [syn˥ tsʊŋ˥ san˥]
Southern Min
- Hokkien POJ: Sun Tiong-san

Courtesy name
- Traditional Chinese: 孫載之
- Simplified Chinese: 孙载之
- Hanyu Pinyin: Sūn Zàizhī
- Jyutping: Syun1 Zoi3-zi1
Transcriptions
Standard Mandarin
- Hanyu Pinyin: Sūn Zàizhī
- Bopomofo: ㄙㄨㄣ ㄗㄞˋ ㄓ
- Wade–Giles: Sun^{1} Tsai^{4}-chih^{1}
- Tongyong Pinyin: Sun Zài-jhih
- IPA: [swə́n tsâɪ.ʈʂɻ̩́]
Yue: Cantonese
- Yale Romanization: Syūn Joi-jī
- Jyutping: Syun1 Zoi3-zi1
- IPA: [syn˥ tsɔj˧ tsi˥]

Sun Yat-sen (Note: traditional Chinese: 孫逸仙; simplified Chinese: 孙逸仙; pinyin: Sūn Yìxiān Usually known as Sun Zhongshan (孫中山; 孙中山) in Chinese; also known by several other names.) (/ˈsʊn ˌjɑːt ˈsɛn/; 12 November 1866 – 12 March 1925) was a Chinese physician, revolutionary and political philosopher who founded the Republic of China (ROC) and the Kuomintang (KMT). Sun is credited with leading the 1911 Revolution and overthrowing the Qing dynasty. He served as the first president of the Provisional Government of the Republic of China (1912) and as the inaugural premier of the Kuomintang.

Born to a poor peasant family in Guangdong, Sun was educated in Hawaii before graduating from the Hong Kong College of Medicine for Chinese in 1892. In 1894 he submitted a petition to reform the Qing government to Li Hongzhang, which was rejected. Sun subsequently went into exile and led anti-Qing movements overseas, founding the Revive China Society, the Tongmenghui, and the People's News.

Following the 1911 Revolution, Sun proclaimed the establishment of the Republic of China but relinquished the presidency to Beiyang Army leader Yuan Shikai in exchange for securing the Qing court's abdication. After the assassination of Song Jiaoren in 1913, widely attributed to Yuan, Sun led a failed Second Revolution against him, after which Sun fled to Japan. In 1917, Sun established a Constitutional Protection junta in Guangzhou, but before his planned Northern Expedition against the warlords, he was forced to resign due to infighting. Sun assumed the junta leadership in 1921, survived Chen Jiongming's revolt, and collaborated with Soviet Union and the Chinese Communist Party to form the First United Front. In late 1924, he traveled north beyond his base in Guangdong to call for a national assembly and the abolition of unequal treaties, continuing his struggle against the warlords Duan Qirui and Zhang Zuolin. He died in Beijing in 1925.

Sun is revered by both the Republic of China, which designates him "Father of the Nation," and the People's Republic of China, which honors him as the "Forerunner of the Revolution." Sun's flagship ideology, Three Principles of the People, sought to modernize China through nationalism, democracy, and the people's livelihood, within an ethnically harmonious conception of the Chinese nation.

== Names ==
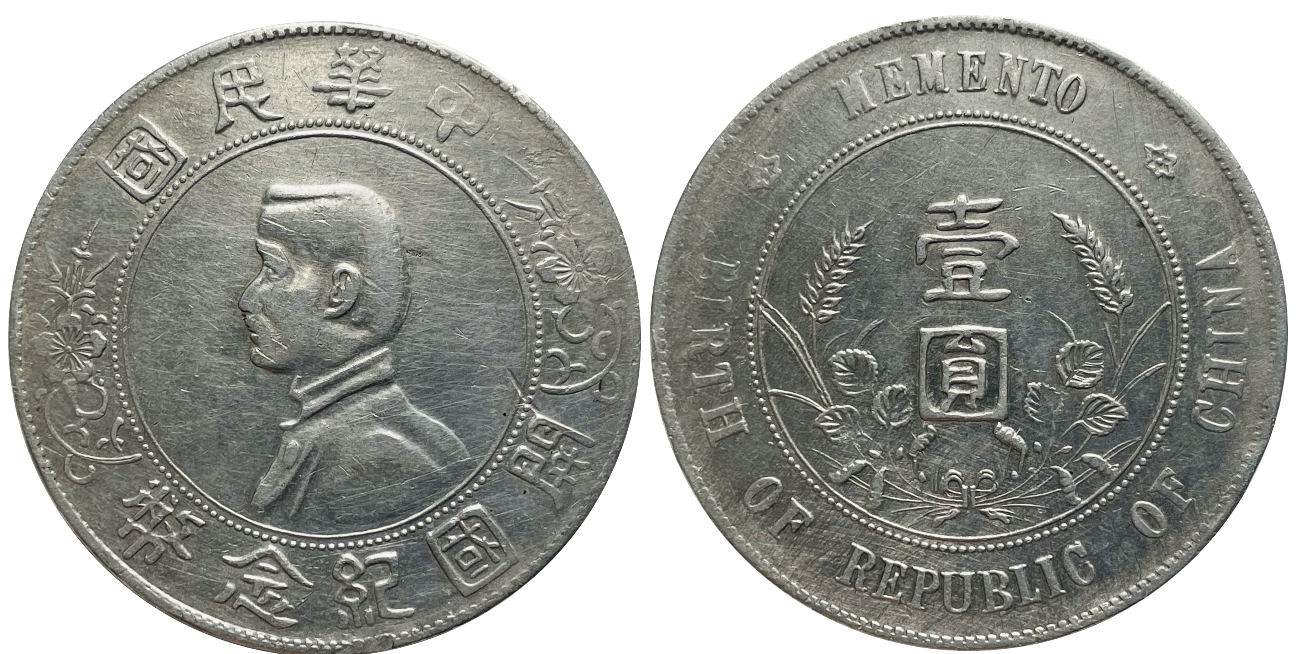
Silver coin: 1 yuan – Sun Yat Sen, 1927

Sun's genealogical name was Sun Deming (Cantonese: Syūn Dāk-mìhng; 孫德明). As a child, his milk name was Tai Tseung (Cantonese: Dai-jeuhng; 帝象). In school, a teacher gave him the name Sun Wen (Cantonese: Syūn Màhn; 孫文), which was used by Sun for most of his life.

Sun's courtesy name was Zaizhi (Cantonese: Joi-jī; 載之), and his art name was Rixin (Yaht-sān; 日新) before it was changed to Yixian (Yaht-sān; 逸仙) when he attended school in British Hong Kong. The most common English form of his name derives from the Cantonese romanization of his art names, which differ in Mandarin pronunciation but are identical in Cantonese.

Sun Zhongshan (Syūn Jūng-sāan; 孫中山, also romanized Chung Shan), his best known name in the Chinese-speaking world, is derived from his Japanese name Kikori Nakayama (中山樵; Nakayama Kikori), the pseudonym given to him by Tōten Miyazaki when he was in hiding in Japan.

His birthplace, originally known as Xiangshan, was renamed Zhongshan in his honour shortly after his death in 1925.

== Early years ==
=== Birthplace and early life ===
Sun Deming was born on 12 November 1866 to Sun Dacheng and Madame Yang. His birthplace was the village of Cuiheng, Xiangshan County (now Zhongshan City), Canton Province (now Guangdong). He was Hakka and Cantonese. His father owned very little land and worked as a tailor in Macau and as a journeyman and a porter. After finishing primary education and meeting childhood friend Lu Haodong, he moved to Honolulu in the Kingdom of Hawaii, where he lived a comfortable life of modest wealth supported by his elder brother Sun Mei.

=== Education ===
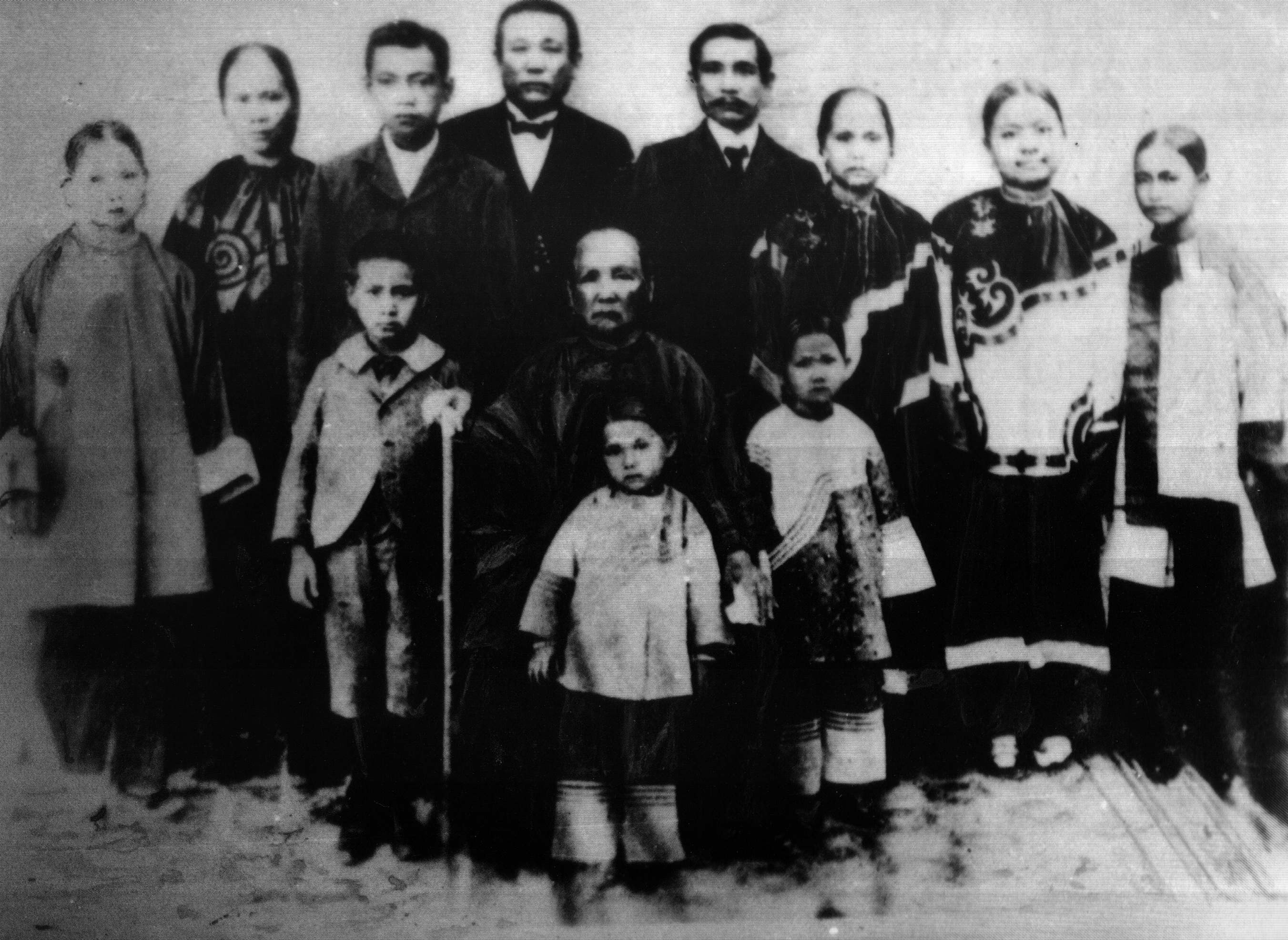
Sun Yat-sen (back row, fourth from right) and his family

Sun began his education at the age of 10, and later attended secondary school in Hawaii. In 1878, after receiving a few years of local schooling, a 13-year-old Sun went to live with his elder brother Sun Mei, who would later make major contributions to overthrowing the Qing dynasty, and who financed Sun's attendance of the ʻIolani School. There, he studied English, British history, mathematics, science, and Christianity. Sun was initially unable to speak English, but quickly acquired it, received a prize for academic achievement from King Kalākaua, and graduated in 1882. He then attended Oahu College (now known as Punahou School) for one semester. Sun Yat-sen learned American history and political ideas extensively during his schooling in Hawaii, particularly admiring figures like Abraham Lincoln and Alexander Hamilton, which profoundly shaped his vision for a democratic China, incorporating concepts of republicanism, self-rule, and economic development inspired by American models. He studied U.S. history and geography, absorbing revolutionary ideals from American schools that influenced his own revolutionary path for China. By 1883, Sun's interest in Christianity had become deeply worrisome for his brother, who, seeing his conversion as inevitable, sent Sun back to China.

Upon returning to China, a 17-year-old Sun met with his childhood friend Lu Haodong at the Beiji Temple (北極殿) in Cuiheng, where villagers engaged in traditional folk healing and worshipped an effigy of the North Star God. Feeling contemptuous of these practices, Sun and Lu incurred the wrath of their fellow villagers by breaking the wooden idol; as a result, Sun's parents felt compelled to dispatch him to Hong Kong. In November 1883, Sun began attending the Diocesan Home and Orphanage on Eastern Street (now the Diocesan Boys' School), and from 15 April 1884 he attended The Government Central School on Gough Street (now Queen's College), until graduating in 1886.

In 1886, Sun studied medicine at the Guangzhou Boji Hospital under the Christian missionary John Glasgow Kerr. According to his book Kidnapped in London, in 1887 Sun heard of the opening of the Hong Kong College of Medicine for Chinese (the forerunner of the University of Hong Kong). He immediately sought to attend, and went on to obtain a license to practice medicine from the institution in 1892; out of a class of twelve students, Sun was one of two who graduated.

== Religious views and Christian baptism ==
Sun was a Christian. Sun said in San Francisco, "Our greatest hope is to make the Bible and Christian education, as we have known it, the means of conveying to our countrymen what blessings may be in the way of just laws." Some historians alleged that Sun was not a real Christian; Sun did not visit the church often nor often celebrate Christian festivals such as Christmas or Easter.

Sun was baptized in Hong Kong on 4 May 1884 by Rev. Charles Robert Hager, an American missionary of the Congregational Church of the United States (American Board of Commissioners for Foreign Missions), to his brother's disdain. The minister would also develop a friendship with Sun. Sun attended To Tsai Church (道濟會堂), founded by the London Missionary Society in 1888, while he studied medicine in Hong Kong College of Medicine for Chinese. Sun pictured a revolution as similar to the salvation mission of the Christian church. His conversion to Christianity was related to his revolutionary ideals and push for advancement.

== Becoming a revolutionary ==
=== Four Bandits ===
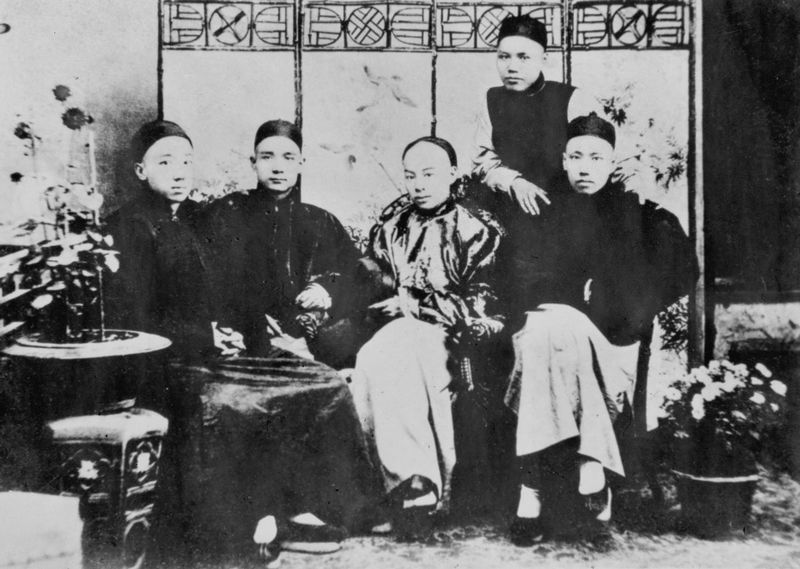
Sun (second from left) and his friends the Four Bandits: Yeung Hok-ling (left), Chan Siu-bak (middle), Yau Lit (right), and Guan Jingliang (關景良, standing) at the Hong Kong College of Medicine for Chinese, circa 1888

During the Qing-dynasty rebellion around 1888, Sun was in Hong Kong with a group of revolutionary thinkers, nicknamed the Four Bandits, at the Hong Kong College of Medicine for Chinese.

=== From Furen Literary Society to Revive China Society ===
In 1891, Sun met revolutionary friends in Hong Kong including Yeung Ku-wan who was the leader and founder of the Furen Literary Society. The group was spreading the idea of overthrowing the Qing. In 1894, Sun wrote an 8,000-character petition to Qing Viceroy Li Hongzhang presenting his ideas for modernizing China. He traveled to Tianjin to personally present the petition to Li but was not granted an audience. After that experience, Sun turned irrevocably toward revolution. He left China for Hawaii and founded the Revive China Society, which was committed to revolutionizing China's prosperity. It was the first Chinese nationalist revolutionary society. Members were drawn mainly from Chinese expatriates, especially from the lower social classes. The same month in 1894, the Furen Literary Society was merged with the Hong Kong chapter of the Revive China Society. Thereafter, Sun became the secretary of the newly merged Revive China Society, which Yeung Ku-wan headed as president. They disguised their activities in Hong Kong under the running of a business under the name "Kuen Hang Club" (乾亨行). Sun had members swear an oath to "Expel the Tartar barbarians, restore China."

=== Heaven and Earth Society and overseas travels to seek financial support ===
A "Heaven and Earth Society" sect known as Tiandihui had been around for a long time. The group has also been referred to as the "three cooperating organizations", as well as the triads. Sun mainly used the group to leverage his overseas travels to gain further financial and resource support for his revolution.

=== First Sino-Japanese War ===
In 1895, China suffered a serious defeat during the First Sino-Japanese War. There were two types of responses. One group of intellectuals contended that the Manchu Qing government could restore its legitimacy by successfully modernizing. Stressing that overthrowing the Manchu would result in chaos and would lead to China being carved up by imperialists, intellectuals like Kang Youwei and Liang Qichao supported responding with initiatives like the Hundred Days' Reform. In another faction, Sun Yat-sen and others like Zou Rong wanted a revolution to replace the dynastic system with a modern nation-state in the form of a republic. The Hundred Days' reform turned out to be a failure by 1898.

== First uprising and exile ==
=== First Guangzhou Uprising ===
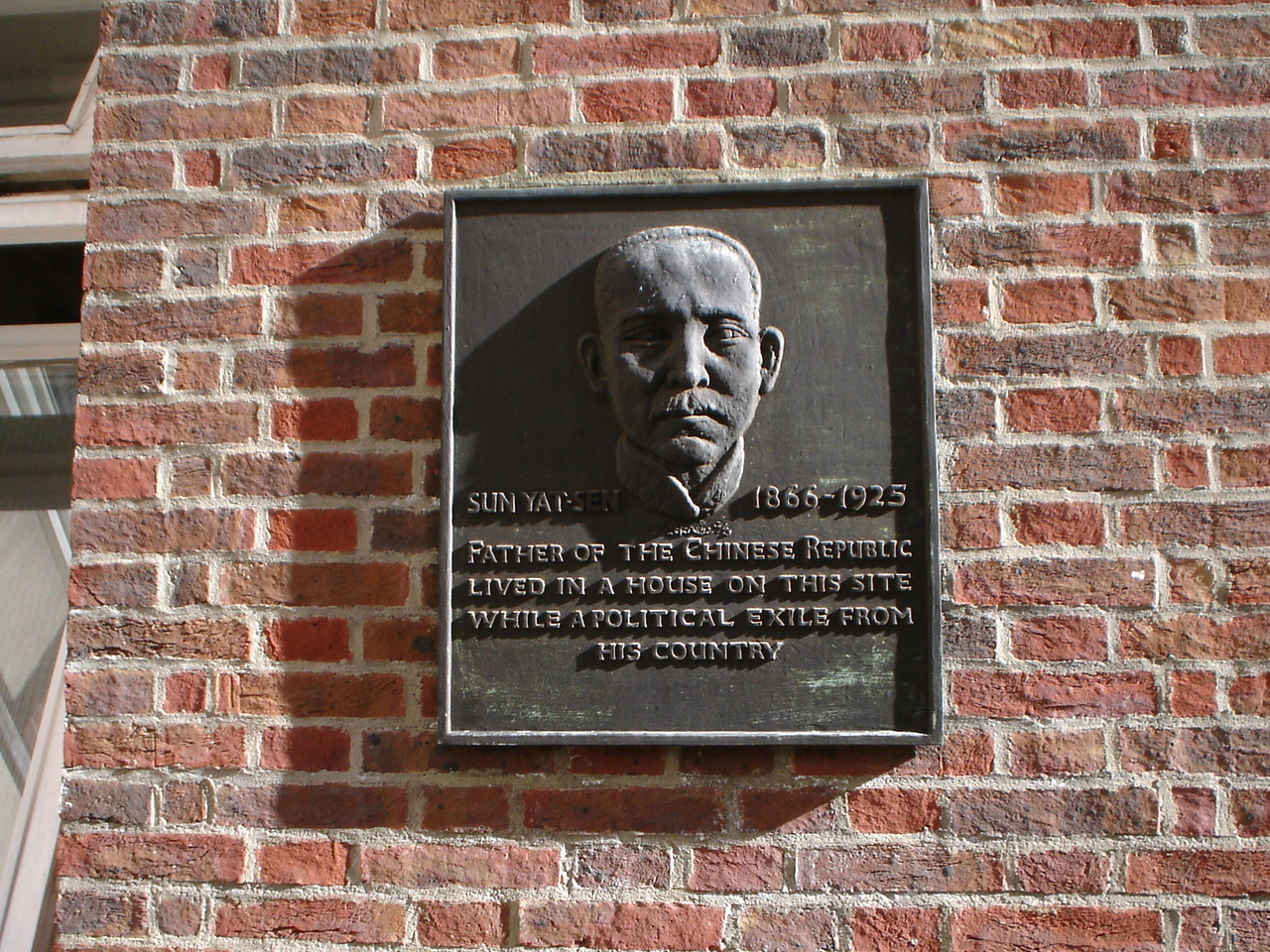
Plaque in London marking the site of a house at 4 Warwick Court, WC1, in which Sun Yat-sen lived in exile. Text: "Father of the Chinese Republic, lived in a house on this site while a political exile from his country".

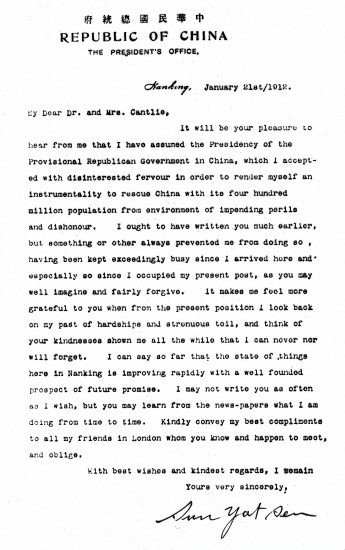
Letter from Sun Yat-sen to James Cantlie announcing to him that he has assumed the Presidency of the Provisional Republican Government of China, dated 21 January 1912

In the second year of the establishment of the Revive China Society, on 26 October 1895, the group planned and launched the First Guangzhou uprising against the Qing in Guangzhou. Yeung Ku-wan directed the uprising starting from Hong Kong. However, plans were leaked out, and more than 70 members, including Lu Haodong, were captured by the Qing government. The uprising was a failure. Sun received financial support mostly from his brother, who sold most of his 12,000 acres of ranch and cattle in Hawaii. Additionally, members of his family and relatives of Sun would take refuge at the home of his brother Sun Mei at Kamaole in Kula, Maui.

=== Exile in the United Kingdom ===
While in exile in London in 1896, Sun raised money for his revolutionary party and to support uprisings in China. While the events leading up to it are unclear, Sun Yat-sen was detained at the Chinese Legation in London on 11 October, where the Chinese secret service planned to smuggle him back to China to execute him for his revolutionary actions. He was released after 12 days by the efforts of James Cantlie, The Globe, The Times, and the Foreign Office, which left Sun a hero in the United Kingdom. (Note: Contrary to a popular legend, Sun entered the Legation voluntarily although he was prevented from leaving. The Legation planned to execute him and to return his body to Beijing for ritual beheading. Cantlie, his former teacher, was refused a writ of habeas corpus because of the Legation's diplomatic immunity, but he began a campaign through The Times. Through diplomatic channels, the British Foreign Office persuaded the Legation to release Sun.) James Cantlie, Sun's former teacher at the Hong Kong College of Medicine for Chinese, maintained a lifelong friendship with Sun and later wrote an early biography of him Sun wrote a book in 1897 about his detention, Kidnapped in London.

The bronze plaque of Sun is currently mounted on an outside wall of the building of "City Junior School" at 4 Gray's Inn Place.

=== Exile in Japan ===
Sun traveled by way of Canada to Japan to begin his exile there. He arrived in Yokohama on 16 August 1897 and met with the Japanese philosopher Tōten Miyazaki. Most Japanese who actively worked with Sun were motivated by a pan-Asian opposition to Western imperialism. In Japan, Sun also met Mariano Ponce, a diplomat of the First Philippine Republic.

During the Philippine Revolution and the Philippine–American War, Sun helped Ponce procure weapons that had been salvaged from the Imperial Japanese Army and ship the weapons to the Philippines. By helping the Philippine Republic, Sun hoped that the Filipinos would retain their independence so that he could be sheltered in the country in staging another Chinese revolution. However, as the war ended in July 1902, the United States emerged victorious from a bitter three-year war against the Republic. Therefore, Sun did not have the opportunity to ally with the Philippines in his revolution in China.

In 1897, through an introduction by Tōten, Sun Yat-sen met Tōyama Mitsuru of the political organization Genyosha. Through Tōyama, he received financial support for his activities and living expenses in Tokyo from Hiraoka Kotarō. Additionally, his residence, a 2,000-square-meter (22,000 sq ft) mansion in Waseda-Tsurumaki-cho, was arranged by Inukai Tsuyoshi.

In 1899, the Boxer Rebellion occurred. The following year, Sun Yat-sen attempted another uprising in Huizhou, but it ended in failure. In 1902, despite already having a wife in China, he married the Japanese teenage girl Kaoru Otsuki. Furthermore, he kept Asada Haru as a mistress and frequently had her accompany him.

== From failed uprisings to revolution ==
=== Huizhou Uprising ===
On 22 October 1900, Sun ordered the launch of the Huizhou Uprising to attack Huizhou and provincial authorities in Guangdong. That came five years after the failed Guangzhou Uprising. This time, Sun appealed to the triads for help. The uprising was another failure. Miyazaki, who participated in the revolt with Sun, wrote an account of the revolutionary effort under the title "33-Year Dream" (三十三年之夢) in 1902.

=== Getting support from Siamese Chinese ===
In 1903, Sun made a secret trip to Bangkok in which he sought funds for his cause in Southeast Asia. His loyal followers published newspapers, providing invaluable support to the dissemination of his revolutionary principles and ideals among Siamese Chinese in Siam (Thailand). In Bangkok, Sun visited Yaowarat Road, in the city's Chinatown. On that street, Sun gave a speech claiming that Overseas Chinese were "the Mother of the Revolution." He also met the local Chinese merchant Seow Houtseng, who sent financial support to him.

Sun's speech on Yaowarat Road was commemorated by the street later being named "Sun Yat Sen Street" or "Soi Sun Yat Sen" (Thai: ซอยซุนยัตเซ็น) in his honour.

=== Getting support from American Chinese ===
According to Lee Yun-ping, chairman of the Chinese historical society, Sun needed a certificate to enter the United States since the Chinese Exclusion Act of 1882 would have otherwise blocked him.

In March 1904, while residing in Kula, Maui, Sun Yat-sen obtained a Certificate of Hawaiian Birth, issued by the Territory of Hawaii, stating that "he was born in the Hawaiian Islands on the 24th day of November, A.D. 1870." He renounced it after it served its purpose to circumvent the Chinese Exclusion Act. Official files of the United States show that Sun had United States nationality, moved to China with his family at age 4, and returned to Hawaii 10 years later.

On 6 April 1904, on his first attempt to enter the United States, Sun Yat-sen landed in San Francisco. He was detained and faced with possible deportation. Sun, represented by the law firm of Ralston & Siddons, based in Washington DC, filed an appeal with the Commissioner-General of Immigration on 26 April 1904. On 28 April 1904, the acting secretary of the Department of Commerce and Labor in a four-page decision contained in the case file, set aside the order of deportation and ordered the Commissioner of Immigration in San Francisco to "permit the said Sun Yat-sen to land." Sun was then freed to embark on his fundraising tour in the United States.

Later in 1911, Sun Yat-sen would visit several Chinese American communities in the United States, including a community in Phoenix, to thank them for their financial support in the revolution.

=== Returned to exile in Japan ===
In 1900, Sun Yat-sen temporarily exiled himself to Japan again. During his stay in Japan, he expressed his thoughts to Inukai Tsuyoshi, saying, "The Meiji Restoration is the first step of the Chinese revolution, and the Chinese revolution is the second step of the Meiji Restoration."

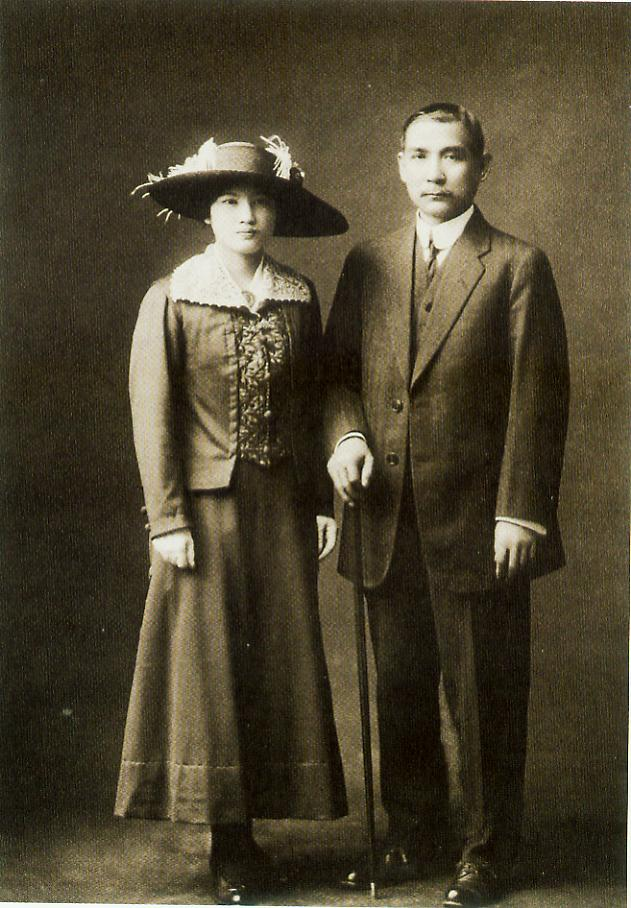
Wedding photo, Sun's 2nd marriage, to Soong Ching-ling, October 1915, Tokyo.

While in Japan, on 25 October 1915, Sun married Soong Ching-ling, the second daughter of Soong Jiashu, who was also a Hakka like him. The arrangement of their marriage was supported by Umeya Shokichi, a Japanese supporter who provided financial aid.

Fusanosuke Kuhara, a prominent figure in Japan's political and business circles, invited Sun to his villa, the Nihonkan, located where the current restaurant "Kochuan" in Shirokane Happo-en stands. Kuhara offered Sun the newly built "Orchid Room" to encourage and support his friend living in a foreign land.

The Orchid Room was equipped with a secret escape route known as "Sun Yat-sen's Escape Passage." This precautionary measure included a hidden door behind the fireplace, which led to an underground tunnel, providing an escape route in case of emergencies.

=== Unifying forces of Tongmenghui in Tokyo ===
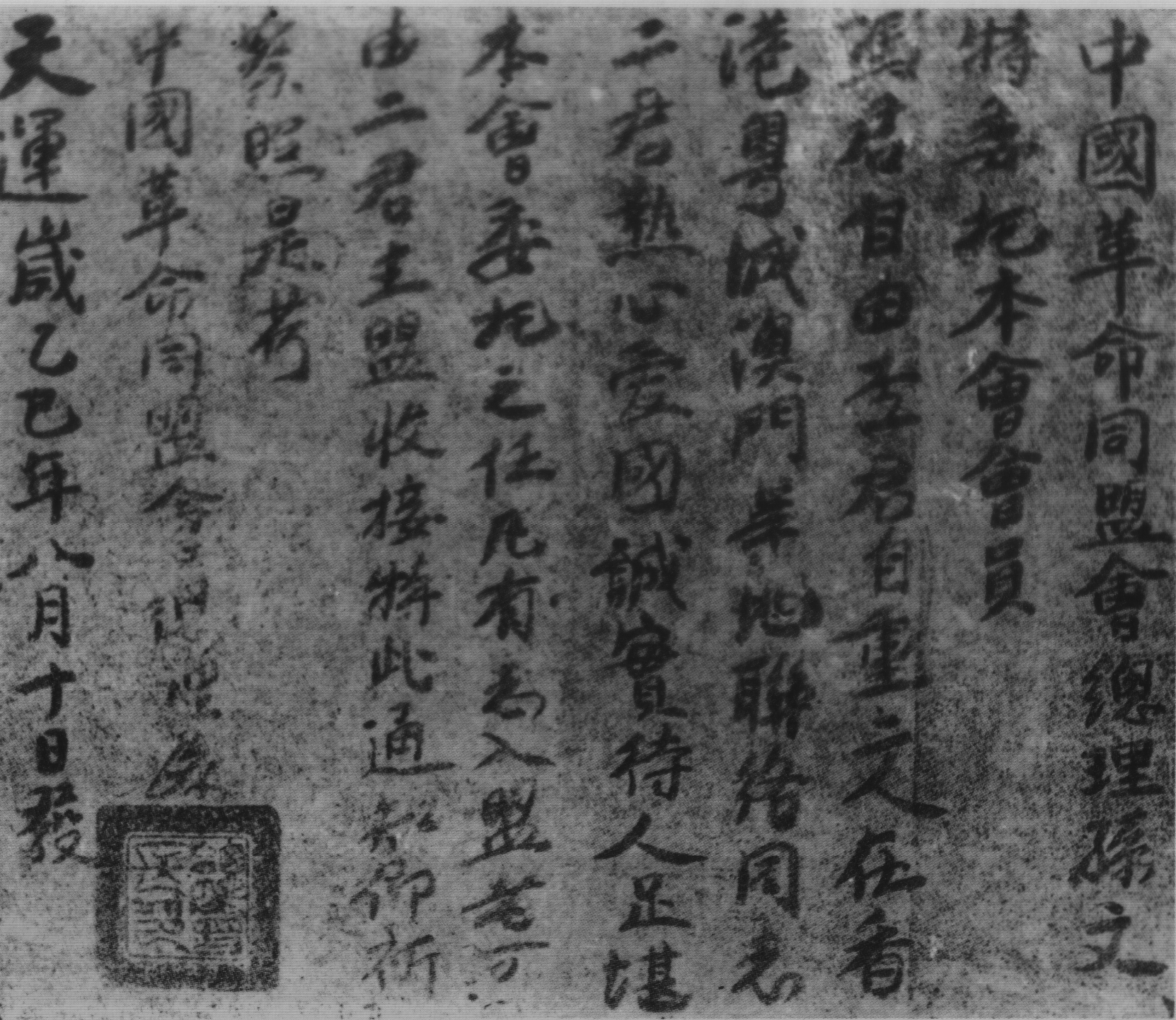
A letter with Sun's seal commencing the Tongmenghui in Hong Kong

In 1904, Sun Yat-sen came about with the goal "to expel the Tatar barbarians (specifically, the Manchu), to revive Zhonghua, to establish a Republic, and to distribute land equally among the people" (驅除韃虜, 恢復中華, 創立民國, 平均地權). One of Sun's major legacies was the creation of his political philosophy of the Three Principles of the People. These Principles included the principle of nationalism (minzu, 民族), of democracy (minquan, 民權), and of welfare (minsheng, 民生).

On 20 August 1905, Sun joined forces with revolutionary Chinese students studying in Tokyo to form the unified group Tongmenghui (United League), which sponsored uprisings in China. By 1906 the number of Tongmenghui members reached 963.

=== Getting support from Malayan Chinese ===
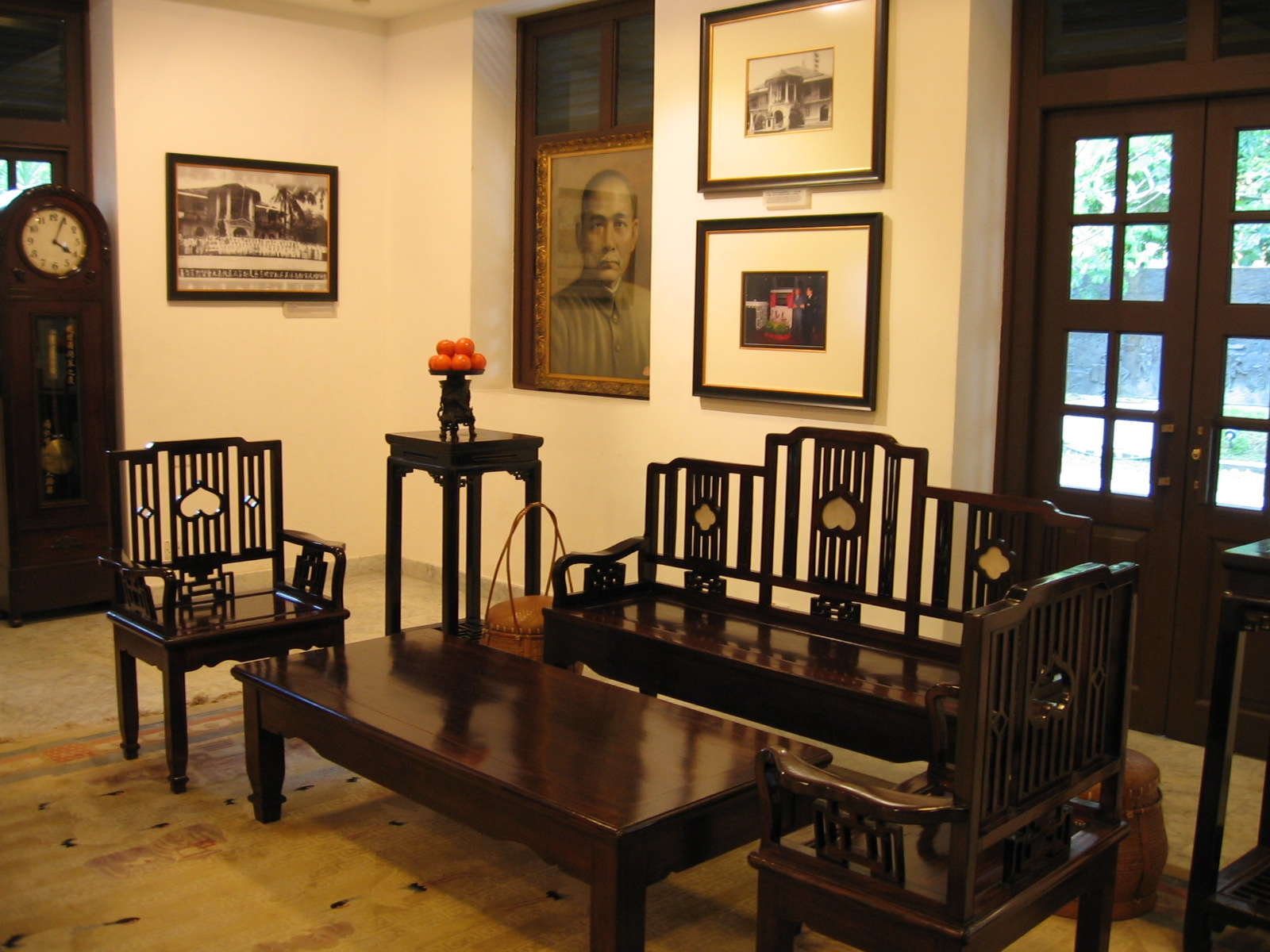
Interior of the Wan Qing Yuan featuring Sun's items and photos

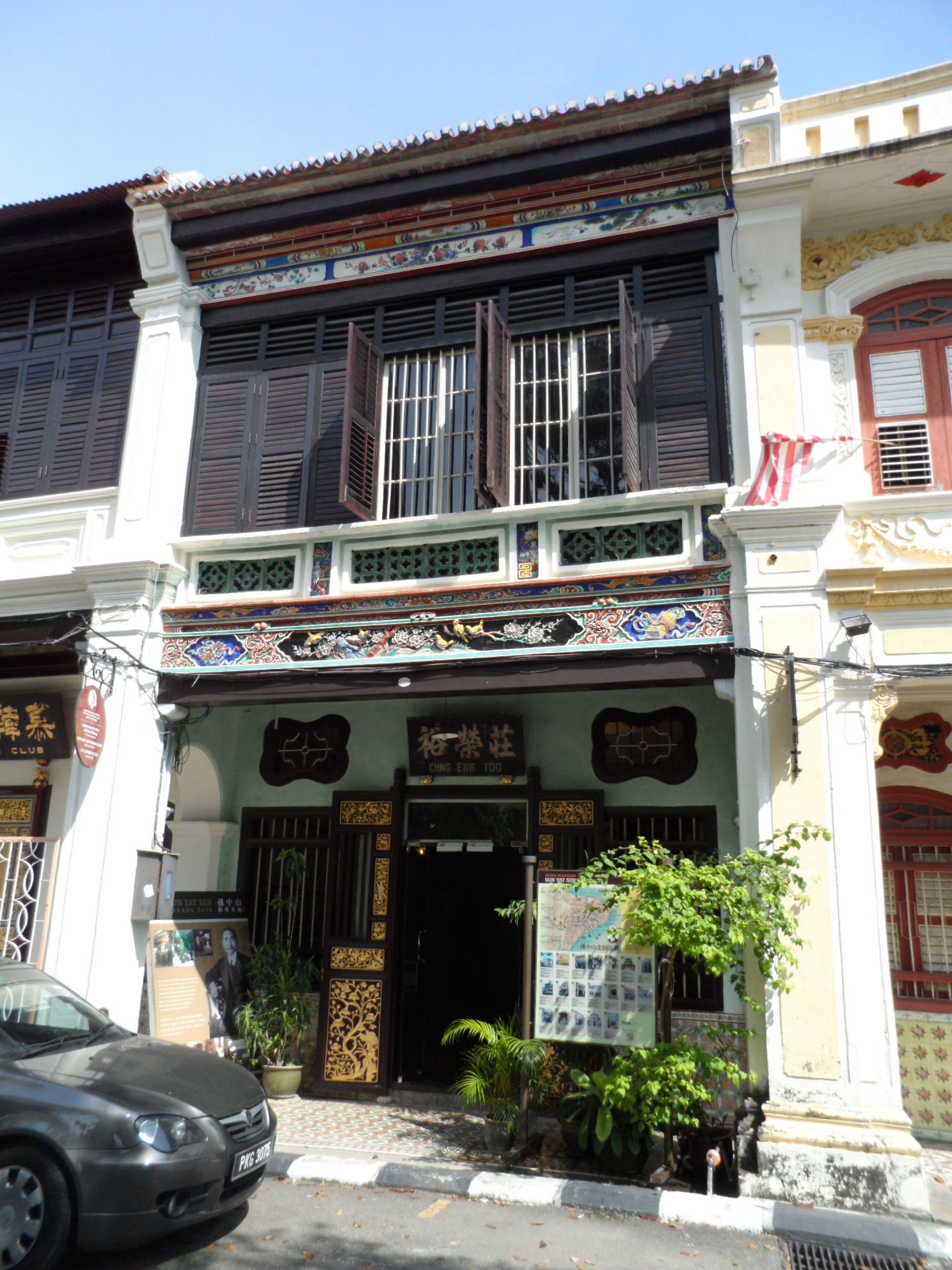
The Sun Yat-sen Museum in George Town, Penang, Malaysia, where he planned the Xinhai Revolution.

Sun's notability and popularity extended beyond the Greater China region, particularly to Nanyang (Southeast Asia), where a large concentration of overseas Chinese resided in Malaya (Malaysia and Singapore). In Singapore, he met the local Chinese merchants Teo Eng Hock (張永福), Tan Chor Nam (陳楚楠) and Lim Nee Soon (林義順), which mark the commencement of direct support from the Nanyang Chinese. The Singapore chapter of the Tongmenghui was established on 6 April 1906, but some records claim the founding date to be end of 1905. The villa used by Sun was known as Wan Qing Yuan. Singapore then was the headquarters of the Tongmenghui.

After founding the Tongmenghui, Sun advocated the establishment of the Chong Shing Yit Pao as the alliance's mouthpiece to promote revolutionary ideas. Later, he initiated the establishment of reading clubs across Singapore and Malaysia to disseminate revolutionary ideas by the lower class through public readings of newspaper stories. The United Chinese Library, founded on 8 August 1910, was one such reading club, first set up at leased property on the second floor of the Wan He Salt Traders in North Boat Quay.

The establishment of United Chinese Library (同德书报社) was encouraged by Sun since 1907. In 1910, the library was rented on the second floor of Wanhe (万和) Salt Godown, in North Boat Quay. In November 1911, the library moved to 51 Armenian Street. Sun missed the ceremony of new address due to delay of ship transportation service.

The registration was approved on 8 August 1911. The library provided over 50,000 books and many of them were destroyed during Japanese occupation of Singapore.

=== Uprisings ===
On 1 December 1907, Sun led the Zhennanguan Uprising against the Qing at Friendship Pass, which is the border between Guangxi and Vietnam. The uprising failed after seven days of fighting. In 1907, there were a total of four failed uprisings, including Huanggang uprising, Huizhou seven women lake uprising and Qinzhou uprising. In 1908, two more uprisings failed: the Qin-lian Uprising and Hekou Uprising.

=== Anti-Sun factionalism ===
Because of the failures, Sun's leadership was challenged by elements from within the Tongmenghui who wished to remove him as leader. In Tokyo, members from the recently merged Restoration society raised doubts about Sun's credentials. Tao Chengzhang and Zhang Binglin publicly denounced Sun in an open leaflet, "A declaration of Sun Yat-sen's Criminal Acts by the Revolutionaries in Southeast Asia", which was printed and distributed in reformist newspapers like Nanyang Zonghui Bao. The goal was to target Sun as a leader leading a revolt only for profiteering.

The revolutionaries were polarized and split between pro-Sun and anti-Sun camps. Sun publicly fought off comments about how he had something to gain financially from the revolution. However, by 19 July 1910, the Tongmenghui headquarters had to relocate from Singapore to Penang to reduce the anti-Sun activities. It was also in Penang that Sun and his supporters would launch the first Chinese "daily" newspaper, the Kwong Wah Yit Poh, in December 1910.

=== 1911 revolution ===
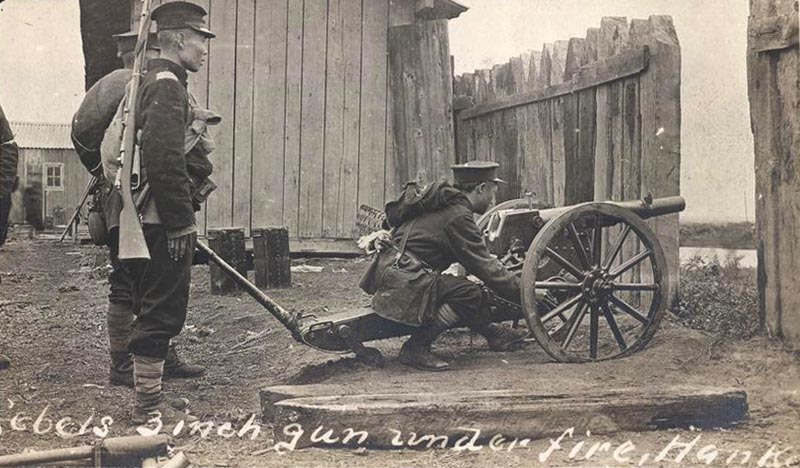
The Revolutionary Army of the Wuchang uprising fighting in the Battle of Yangxia

To sponsor more uprisings, Sun made a personal plea for financial aid at the Penang conference, held on 13 November 1910 in Malaya. The high-powered preparatory meeting of Sun's supporters was subsequently held in Ipoh, Singapore, at the villa of Teh Lay Seng, the chairman of the Tungmenghui, to raise funds for the Huanghuagang uprising, also known as the Yellow Flower Mound Uprising. The Ipoh leaders were Teh Lay Seng, Wong I Ek, Lee Guan Swee, and Lee Hau Cheong. The leaders launched a major drive for donations across the Malay Peninsula and raised HK$187,000.

On 27 April 1911, the revolutionary Huang Xing led the Yellow Flower Mound Uprising against the Qing. The revolt failed and ended in disaster. The bodies of only 72 revolutionaries were identified of the 86 that were found. The revolutionaries are remembered as martyrs. Despite the failure of this uprising, which was due to a leak, it was successful in triggering off the trend of nation-wide revolts.

On 10 October 1911, the military Wuchang uprising took place and was led again by Huang Xing. The uprising expanded to the Xinhai Revolution, also known as the "Chinese Revolution", to overthrow the last emperor, Puyi. That put Huang in charge of the revolution that ended over 2000 years of imperial rule in China. On 12 October, when Sun learned of the successful rebellion against the Qing emperor from press reports, he returned to China from the United States and was accompanied by his closest foreign advisor, the American "General" Homer Lea, an adventurer whom Sun had met in London when they attempted to arrange British financing for the future Chinese republic. Both sailed for China, arriving there on 21 December 1911.

== Republic of China with multiple governments ==
=== Provisional government ===
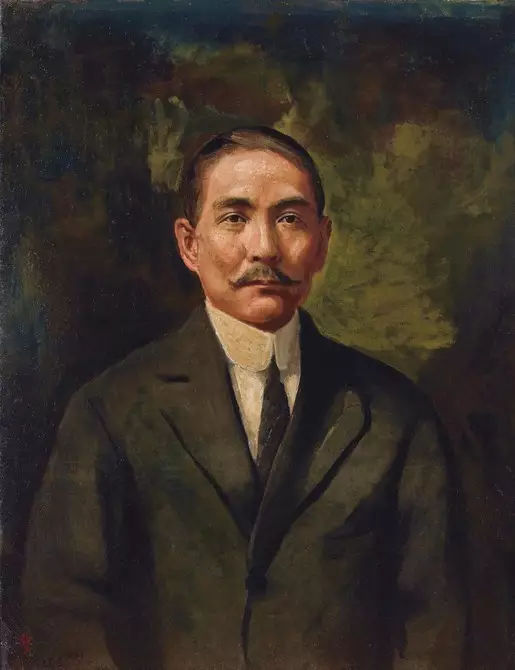
Portrait of Sun Yat-sen (1921) by Li Tiefu

On 29 December 1911, a meeting of representatives from provinces in Nanjing elected Sun as the provisional president. 1 January 1912 was set as the epoch of the new republican calendar. Li Yuanhong was made provisional vice-president, and Huang Xing became the minister of the army. It was argued Sun was a 'compromise candidate' to end an impasse and power struggle between Li Yuanhong and Huang Xing over the role of the Generalissimo. A new provisional government for the Republic of China was created, along with a provisional constitution. Sun is credited for funding the revolutions and for keeping revolutionary spirit alive, even after a series of false starts. His successful merger of smaller revolutionary groups into a single coherent party provided a better base for those who shared revolutionary ideals. Under Sun's provisional government, several innovations were introduced, such as the aforementioned calendar system, and fashionable Zhongshan suits.

=== Beiyang government ===
Yuan Shikai, who was in control of the Beiyang Army, had been promised the position of president of the Republic of China if he could get the Qing court to abdicate. On 12 February 1912, the Emperor did abdicate the throne. Sun stepped down as president, and Yuan became the new provisional president in Beijing on 10 March 1912. The provisional government did not have any military forces of its own. Its control over elements of the new army that had mutinied was limited, and significant forces still had not declared against the Qing.

Sun Yat-sen sent telegrams to the leaders of all provinces to request them to elect and to establish the National Assembly in 1912. In May 1912, the legislative assembly moved from Nanjing to Beijing, with its 120 members divided between members of the Tongmenghui and a republican party that supported Yuan Shikai. Many revolutionary members were already alarmed by Yuan's ambitions and the northern-based Beiyang government.

=== New Nationalist party in 1912, failed Second Revolution and new exile ===
The Tongmenghui member Song Jiaoren quickly tried to control the assembly. He mobilized the old Tongmenghui at the core with the mergers of a number of new small parties to form a new political party, the Kuomintang (Chinese Nationalist Party, commonly abbreviated as "KMT") on 25 August 1912 at Huguang Guild Hall, Beijing. The 1912–1913 National assembly election was considered a huge success for the KMT, which won 269 of the 596 seats in the lower house and 123 of the 274 seats in the upper house. In retaliation, the KMT leader Song Jiaoren was assassinated, almost certainly by a secret order of Yuan, on 20 March 1913. The Second Revolution took place by Sun and KMT military forces trying to overthrow Yuan's forces of about 80,000 men in an armed conflict in July 1913. The revolt against Yuan was unsuccessful. In August 1913, Sun fled to Japan, where he later enlisted financial aid by the politician and industrialist Fusanosuke Kuhara.

=== Warlords chaos ===
In 1915, Yuan proclaimed the Empire of China with himself as Emperor of China. Sun took part in the National Protection War of the Constitutional Protection Movement and also supported bandit leaders like Bai Lang during the Bai Lang Rebellion, which marked the beginning of the Warlord Era. In 1915, Sun wrote to the Second International, a socialist-based organization in Paris, and asked it to send a team of specialists to help China set up the world's first socialist republic. The same year, Sun received the Indian communist M.N. Roy as a guest. There were then many theories and proposals of what China could be. In the political mess, both Sun Yat-sen and Xu Shichang were announced as president of the Republic of China.

== Alliance with Communist Party and Northern Expedition ==
=== Guangzhou militarist government ===
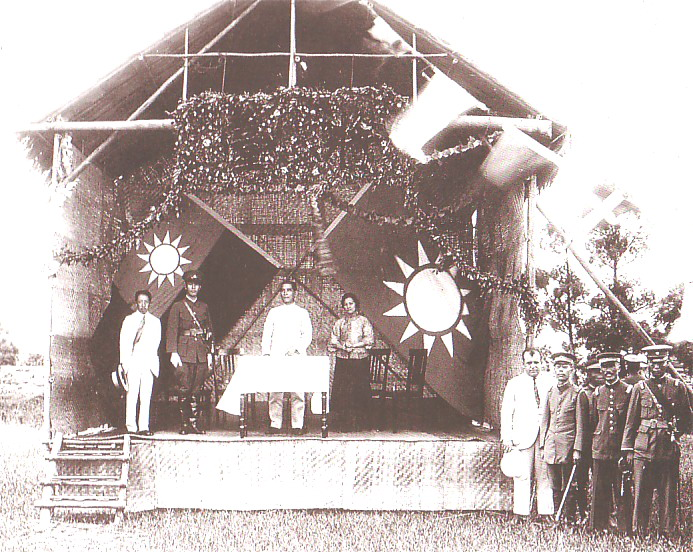
(L-R): Liao Zhongkai, Chiang Kai-shek, Sun Yat-sen and Soong Ching-ling at the founding of the Whampoa Military Academy in 1924

China had become divided among regional military leaders. Sun saw the danger and returned to China in 1916 to advocate Chinese reunification. In 1921, he started a self-proclaimed military government in Guangzhou and was elected grand marshal. According to historian William C. Kirby, between 1912 and 1927, three governments were set up in South China: the Provisional government in Nanjing (1912), the Military government in Guangzhou (1923–1925), and the National government in Guangzhou and later Wuhan (1925–1927). The governments in the south were established to rival the Beiyang government in the north. Yuan Shikai had banned the KMT. The short-lived Chinese Revolutionary Party was a temporary replacement for the KMT. On 10 October 1919, Sun resurrected the KMT with the new name Chung-kuo Kuomintang, or "Nationalist Party of China."

=== First United Front ===
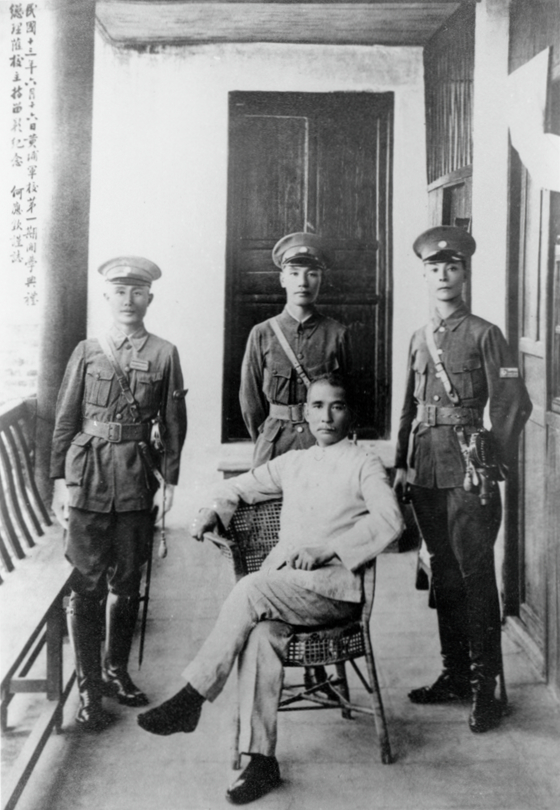
Sun Yat-sen (seated), He Yingqin, Chiang Kai-shek and Wang Boling in 1924

Sun was now convinced that the only hope for a unified China lay in a military conquest from his base in the south, followed by a period of political tutelage, which would culminate in the transition to democracy. To hasten the conquest of China, he began a policy of active co-operation with the Chinese Communist Party (CCP).

In January 1923, Sun broadcast his Peaceful Reunification Manifesto on the radio. He called for the four major warlord factions to stay in their respective territories, decrease their troops, and avoid interfering in each other's affairs. In a maneuver likely intended to flatter Britain and the United States while pressuring the Soviet Union, Sun appealed for a "friendly power" to help guide the proposed disarmament process in China. Sun's bargaining posture improved as a result, and the morning after the broadcast he met with Soviet Ambassador Adolph Joffe to discuss Soviet assistance for the KMT.

Sun and the Soviet Union's Adolph Joffe signed the Sun-Joffe Manifesto in January 1923. Sun received help from the Comintern for his acceptance of communist members into his KMT. Sun received assistance from Soviet advisor Mikhail Borodin, whom Sun described as his "Lafayette". The Russian revolutionary and socialist leader Vladimir Lenin praised Sun and his KMT for its ideology, principles, attempts at social reformation, and fight against foreign imperialism. Sun also returned the praise by calling Lenin a "great man" and indicated that he wished to follow the same path as Lenin. In 1923, after having been in contact with Lenin and other Moscow communists, Sun sent representatives to study the Red Army, and in turn, the Soviets sent representatives to help reorganize the KMT at Sun's request.

With the Soviets' help, Sun was able to develop the military power needed for the Northern Expedition against the military at the north. He established the Whampoa Military Academy near Guangzhou with Chiang Kai-shek as the commandant of the National Revolutionary Army (NRA). Other Whampoa leaders include Wang Jingwei and Hu Hanmin as political instructors. This full collaboration was called the First United Front.

On his deathbed, Sun reiterated his loyalty and friendship with the Soviet Union in one of his three last wills which was written by himself. He stated the need to cooperate to defeat imperialism in Asia, hailing the Soviets as the bulwark of anti-imperialism.

=== Financial concerns ===
In 1924 Sun appointed his brother-in-law T. V. Soong to set up the first Chinese central bank, the Canton Central Bank. To establish national capitalism and a banking system was a major objective for the KMT. However, Sun met opposition by the Canton Merchant Volunteers Corps uprising against him.

== Final years ==
Sun's 1924 Outline of the Foundation of the Nationalist State aimed to reclaim control of transportation and trade from foreign entities.

=== Final speeches ===
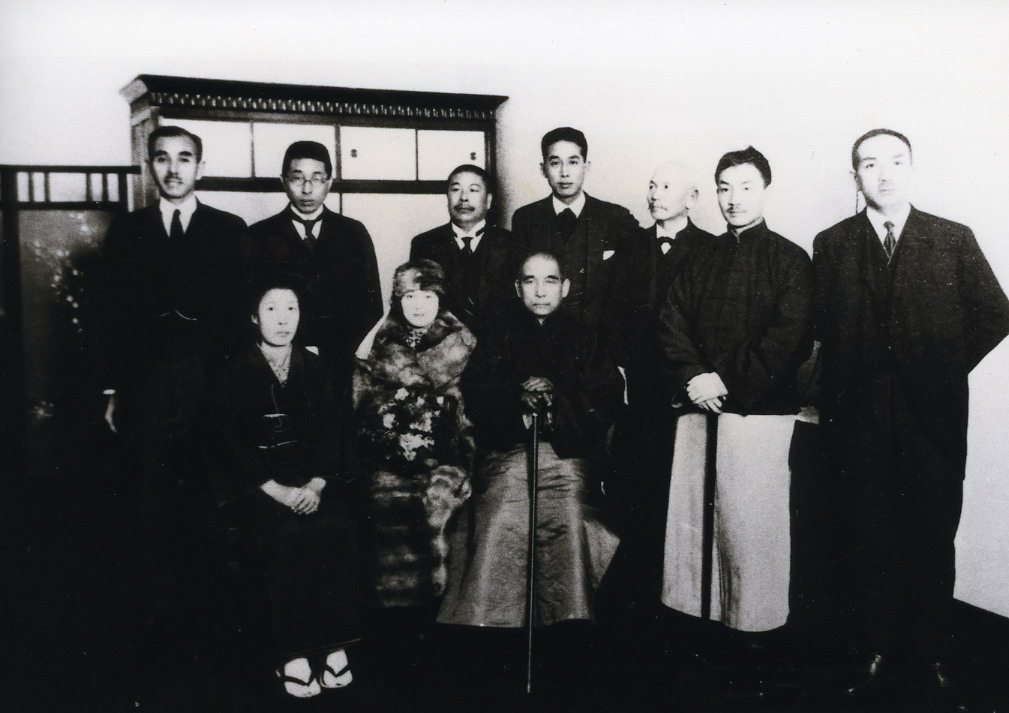
Sun (seated, center) and his wife Soong Ching-ling (seated next to him) in Kobe, Japan in 1924

In February 1923, Sun made a presentation to the Students' Union in Hong Kong University and declared that the corruption of China and the peace, order, and good government of Hong Kong had turned him into a revolutionary. The same year, he delivered a speech in which he proclaimed his Three Principles of the People as the foundation of the country and the Five-Yuan Constitution as the guideline for the political system and bureaucracy. Part of the speech was made into the National Anthem of the Republic of China.

On 10 November 1924, Sun traveled north to Tianjin and delivered a speech to suggest a gathering for a "national conference" for the Chinese people. He called for the end of warlord rules and the abolition of all unequal treaties with the Western powers. Two days later, he traveled to Beijing to discuss the future of the country despite his deteriorating health and the ongoing civil war of the warlords. Among the people whom he met was the Muslim warlord General Ma Fuxiang, who informed Sun that he would welcome Sun's leadership. On 28 November 1924 Sun traveled to Japan and gave a speech on Pan-Asianism at Kobe, Japan.

=== Illness and death ===
For many years, it was popularly believed that Sun died of liver cancer. On 26 January 1925, Sun underwent an exploratory laparotomy at Peking Union Medical College Hospital (PUMCH) to investigate a long-term illness. It was performed by the head of the Department of Surgery, Adrian S. Taylor, who stated that the procedure "revealed extensive involvement of the liver by carcinoma" and that Sun had only about ten days to live. Sun was hospitalized, and his condition was treated with radium. Sun survived the initial ten-day period, and on 18 February, against the advice of doctors, he was transferred to the KMT headquarters and treated with traditional Chinese medicine. That was also unsuccessful, and he died on 12 March, at the age of 58. Contemporary reports in The New York Times, Time, and the Chinese newspaper Qun Qiang Bao all reported the cause of death as liver cancer, based on Taylor's observation, despite an autopsy stating the cause of death was gall bladder cancer, which had spread to the liver.

Sun left three deathbed testaments, one to the party, one to his family, and one to the Soviet Union. The first two were drafted by Wang Jingwei on Sun's behalf. The third was dictated by Sun himself.

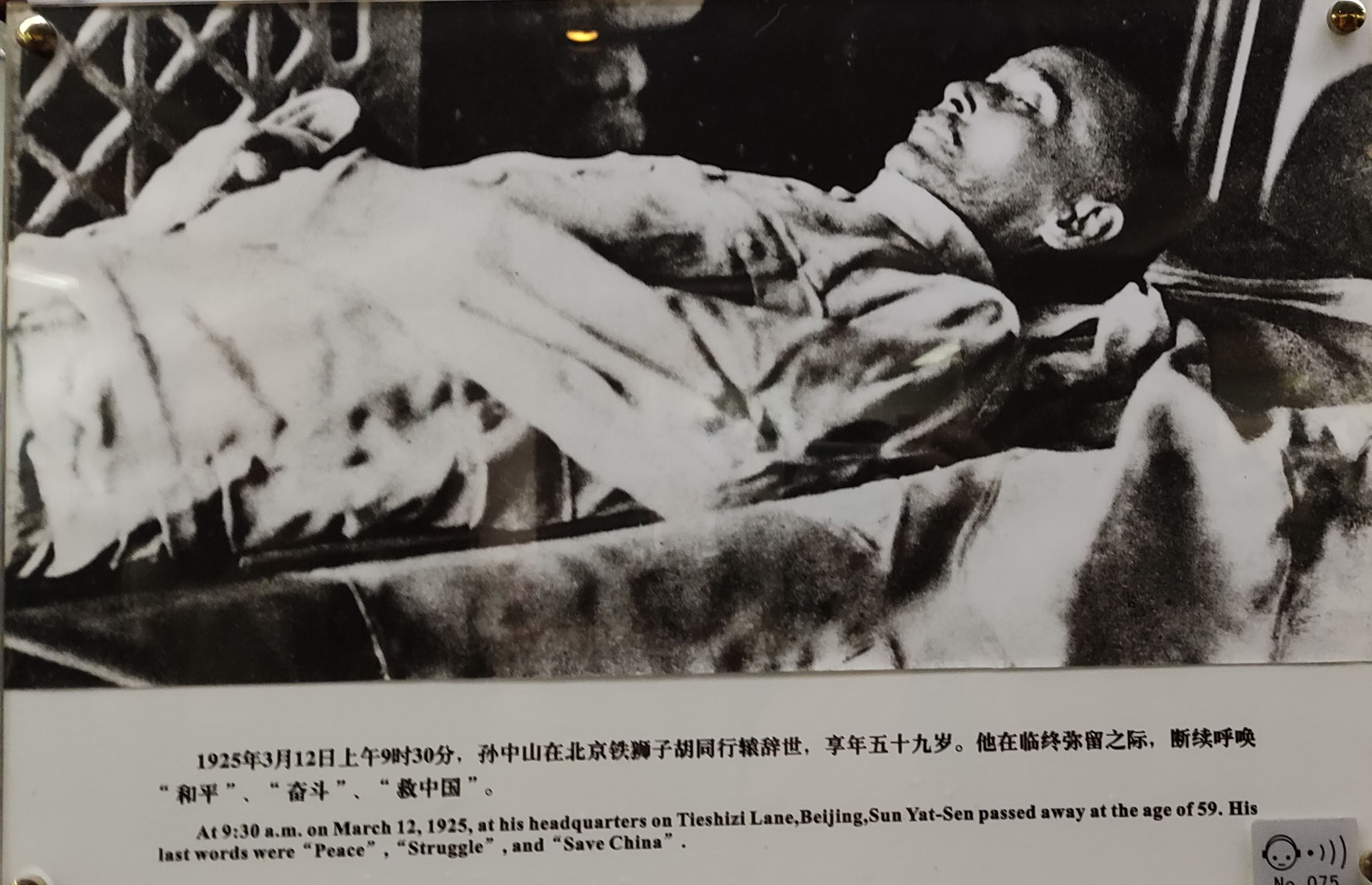
Sun Yat-sen on his death bed. Picture at The Museum of Dr. Sun Yat-sen in Cuiheng

Sun's body was preserved in mineral oil and taken to the Temple of Azure Clouds, a Buddhist shrine in the Western Hills a few miles outside Beijing. A glass-covered steel coffin was sent by the Soviet Union to the Sun Yat-sen Memorial Hall at Temple of Azure Clouds as a permanent repository for the body but was ultimately declined by the family as unsuitable. The body was embalmed for preservation by Peking Union Medical College who reportedly guaranteed its preservation for 150 years.

In 1926, construction began on a majestic mausoleum at the foot of Purple Mountain in Nanjing, which was completed in the spring of 1929. On 1 June 1929, Sun's remains were moved from Beijing and interred in the Sun Yat-sen Mausoleum.

By chance, in May 2016, an American pathologist, Rolf F. Barth, was visiting the Sun Yat-sen Memorial Hall in Guangzhou when he noticed a faded copy of the original autopsy report on display. The autopsy was performed immediately after Sun's death by James Cash, a pathologist at PUMCH. Based on a tissue sample, Cash concluded that the cause of death was an adenocarcinoma in the gallbladder that had metastasized to the liver. In modern China, liver cancer is far more common than gallbladder cancer. Although the incidence rates for either one in 1925 are not known, if one assumes that they were similar to modern rates, the original diagnosis by Taylor was a reasonable conclusion. From the time of Sun's death to the appearance of Barth's report in the Chinese Journal of Cancer in September 2016, Sun's true cause of death was not reported in any English-language publication. Even in Chinese-language sources, it appeared in only one non-medical online report in 2013.

== Legacy ==
=== Power struggle ===
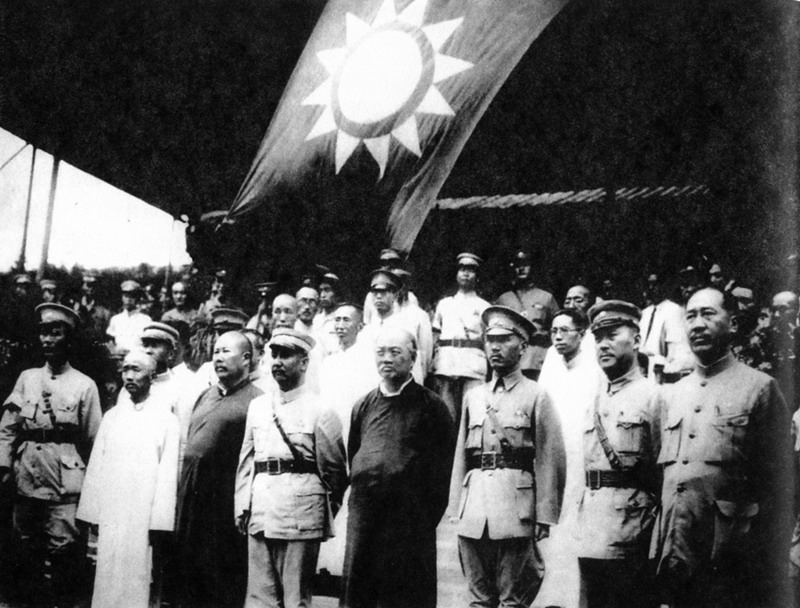
Chinese generals at the Sun Yat-sen Mausoleum in 1928 after the Northern Expedition. From right: Cheng Jin (何成浚), Zhang Zuobao (張作寶), Chen Diaoyuan (陳調元), Chiang Kai-shek, Woo Tsin-hang, Yan Xishan, Ma Fuxiang, Ma Sida (馬四達), and Bai Chongxi.

After Sun's death, Wang Jingwei became the first president of the Nationalist government, which soon fragmented into three competing factions: the center-right Nanjing government led by Chiang Kai-shek, the leftist Wuhan government led by Wang Jingwei, and the far-right Western Hills Group, originally convened in Beijing, which maintained its own Central Executive Committee in Shanghai. Each rival power center controlled its own provincial military.

At stake in the struggle was the right to lay claim to Sun's ambiguous legacy. In 1927, Chiang married Soong Mei-ling, a sister of Sun's widow Soong Ching-ling, and he could now claim to be a brother-in-law of Sun. When the Nationalists committed the Shanghai massacre in 1927, splitting with the Communists and starting the Chinese Civil War, each group claimed to be his true heirs, and the conflict that continued until World War II. When Wang Jingwei, who had led the collaborationist government during World War II, was buried on the mountain next to the Sun Yat-sen Mausoleum in 1944, Chiang had Wang's tomb demolished after the war.

Sun's widow, Soong Ching-ling, sided with the Communists during the Chinese Civil War and was critical of Chiang's regime since the Shanghai massacre in 1927. She held high but largely honorary positions after the founding of the People's Republic.

=== Personality cult ===
A personality cult in the Republic of China was centered on Sun and his successor, Generalissimo Chiang Kai-shek. The cult was created after Sun Yat-sen died. Chinese Muslim generals and imams participated in the personality cult and the one-party state, with Muslim General Ma Bufang making people bow to Sun's portrait and listen to the national anthem during a Tibetan and Mongol religious ceremony for the Qinghai Lake god. Quotes from the Qur'an and the Hadith were used by Hui Muslims to justify Chiang's rule over China.

The Kuomintang's constitution designated Sun as the party president. After his death, the Kuomintang opted to keep that language in its constitution to honor his memory forever. The party has since been headed by a director-general (1927–1975) and a chairman (since 1975), who discharge the functions of the president.

Though he took a stance against idolatry in life, Sun sometimes became worshiped as a god among people. For example, a KMT committee member Hsieh Kun-hong controversially referred to Sun as having "become immortal" after death under the posthumous name of "Great Merciful True Monarch" (Chinese: 偉慈真君) in 2021. Sun is already worshipped in the syncretic Vietnamese religion of Caodaism.

=== Father of the Nation ===
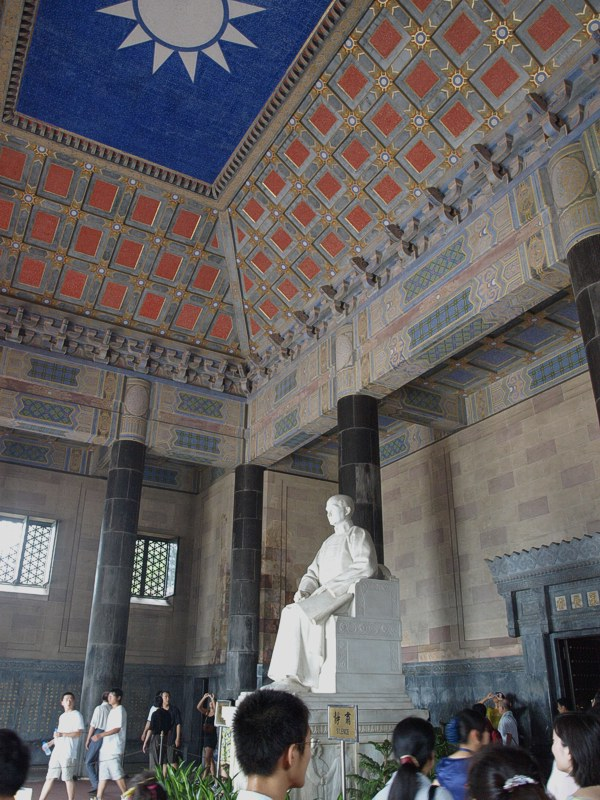
Statue of Sun at his Mausoleum in Nanjing, with a Kuomintang flag on the ceiling

Sun Yat-sen remains unique among 20th-century Chinese leaders for having a high reputation in both Mainland China and Taiwan. In Taiwan, he is seen as the Father of the Republic of China and is known by the posthumous name Father of the Nation, Mr. Sun Zhongshan (Chinese: 國父 孫中山先生, and the one-character space is a traditional homage symbol).

=== Forerunner of revolution ===
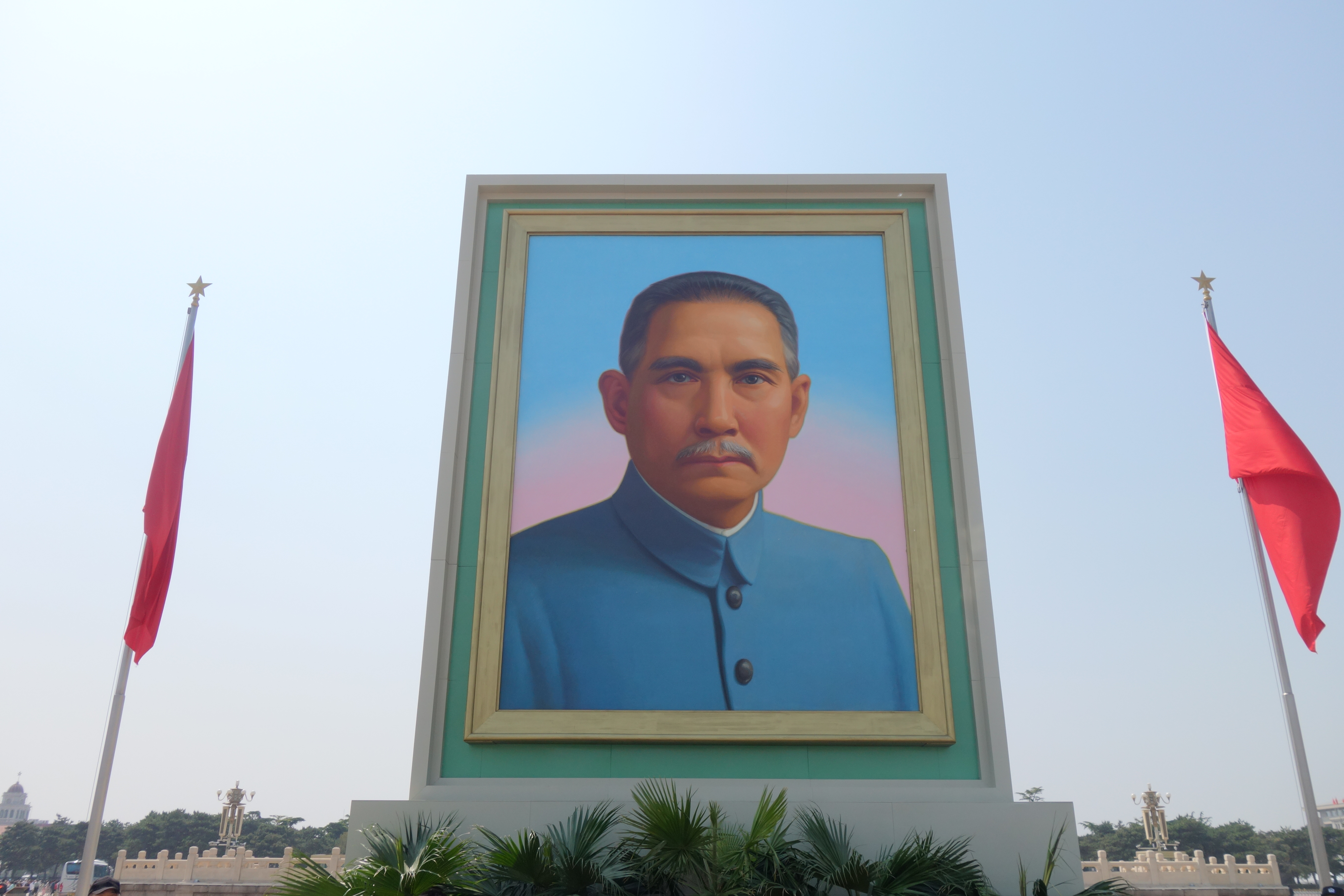
Sun Yat-sen tribute in Tiananmen Square in front of the Monument to the People's Heroes, 2021

In Mainland China, Sun is seen as a Chinese nationalist, a proto-socialist, and the first president of a Republican China and is highly regarded as the Forerunner of the Revolution (革命先行者). He is mentioned by name in the preamble to the Constitution of the People's Republic of China. In recent years, the leadership of the Chinese Communist Party has increasingly invoked Sun, partly as a way of bolstering Chinese nationalism in light of the reform and opening up and partly to increase connections with supporters of the Kuomintang on Taiwan, which the People's Republic of China sees as allies against Taiwan independence. Sun's tomb was one of the first stops made by the leaders of both the Kuomintang and the People First Party on their pan-blue visit to mainland China in 2005. A massive portrait of Sun continues to appear in Tiananmen Square for May Day and National Day.

In 1956, Mao Zedong said, "Let us pay tribute to our great revolutionary forerunner, Dr. Sun Yat-sen!... he bequeathed to us much that is useful in the sphere of political thought."

Xi Jinping incorporates Sun's legacy into his discourse on national rejuvenation. Xi describes Sun as the first person to propose a method for Chinese revival, including adopting the first blueprint for China's modernization.

=== New Three Principles of the People ===
Sun's Three Principles of the People has been reinterpreted by the Chinese Communist Party to argue that communism is a necessary conclusion of them and thus provide legitimacy for the government. This reinterpretation of the Three Principles of the People is commonly referred to as the New Three Principles of the People (Chinese: 新三民主義, also translated as "neo-tridemism"), a word coined by Mao's 1940 essay On New Democracy in which he argued that the Communist Party is a better enforcer of the Three Principles of the People compared to the bourgeois Kuomintang and that the new three principles are about allying with the communists and the Russians (Soviets) and supporting the peasants and the workers. Proponents of the New Three Principles of the People claim that Sun's book Three Principles of the People acknowledges that the principles of welfare is inherently socialistic and communistic.

During the 90th anniversary of the Xinhai Revolution in 2001, former CCP General Secretary Jiang Zemin claimed that Sun supposedly advocated for the "New Three Principles of the People." In 2001, Sun's granddaughter Lily Sun said that the Chinese Communists were distorting Sun's legacy. She again voiced her displeasure in 2002 in a private letter to Jiang about the distortion of history. In 2008 Jiang Zemin was willing to offer US$10 million to sponsor a Xinhai Revolution anniversary celebration event. According to Ming Pao, she did not take the money because then she would not "have the freedom to properly communicate the Revolution."

=== KMT emblem removal case ===
In 1981, Lily Sun took a trip to Sun Yat-sen Mausoleum in Nanjing. The emblem of the KMT had been removed from the top of his sacrificial hall at the time of her visit but was later restored. On another visit in May 2011, she was surprised to find the four-character "General Rules of Meetings" (會議通則), a document that Sun wrote in reference to Robert's Rules of Order had been removed from a stone carving.

=== Founding father of the nation debate ===
In 1940, the Republic of China (ROC) government had bestowed the title of "father of the nation" on Sun. However, after 1949, as a result of the Chiang regime's arrival in Taiwan, his "father of the nation" designation continued only in Taiwan.

Sun visited Taiwan briefly on only three occasions (in 1900, 1913, and 1918) or four by counting 1924, when his boat had stopped in Keelung Harbor, but he did not disembark.

In November 2004, the Taiwanese Ministry of Education proposed that Sun was not the father of Taiwan. Instead, Sun was a foreigner from mainland China. Taiwanese Education Minister Tu Cheng-sheng and the Examination Yuan member Lin Yu-ti, both of whom supported the proposal, had their portraits pelted with eggs in protest. At a Sun Yat-sen statue in Kaohsiung, a 70-year-old retired soldier of the Republic of China committed suicide on Sun's birthday, 12 November, to protest the ministry's proposal.

== Views ==
=== Western culture ===
Sun Yat-sen was a lifelong Christian, and saw it as the best way to develop the Chinese nation. He went on foreign trips to gather support and resources of Western and Christian nations. He was highly critical of anything from ancient Chinese which did not conform to Western standards and ideals. This led him and his group to break idols and denounce Chinese medicine amongst other things.

=== Economic development ===
Sun Yat-sen spent years in Hawaii as a student in the late 1870s and early 1880s and was highly impressed with the economic development that he saw there. He used the Kingdom of Hawaii as a model to develop his vision of a technologically modern, politically independent, actively anti-imperialist China. Sun, an important pioneer of international development, proposed in the 1920s international institutions of the sort that appeared after World War II. He focused on China, with its vast potential and weak base of mostly local entrepreneurs.

His key proposal was socialism. He proposed:

The State will take over all the large enterprises; we shall encourage and protect enterprises which may reasonably be entrusted to the people; the nation will possess equality with other nations; every Chinese will be equal to every other Chinese both politically and in his opportunities of economic advancement.

He also proposed, "If we use existing foreign capital to build up a future communist society in China, half the work will bring double the results." He also said, "It is my idea to make capitalism create socialism in China."

Sun promoted the ideas of the economist Henry George and was influenced by Georgist ideas on land ownership and a land value tax.

=== Culture ===
Sun supported natalism and had eugenic ideals. He favored premarital health examinations, sterilization of those perceived as unfit, and other programs for socially engineering China's population. In Sun's view, China had only endured Western invasions and colonial rule because of its large population. Those views led him to oppose the use of birth control.

=== Pan-Asianism ===
Sun was a proponent of Pan-Asianism. He said that Asia was the "cradle of the world's oldest civilisation" and that "even the ancient civilisations of the West, of Greece and Rome, had their origins on Asiatic soil." He thought that it was only in recent times that Asians "gradually degenerated and become weak." For Sun, "Pan-Asianism is based on the principle of the Rule of Right, and justifies the avenging of wrongs done to others." He advocated overthrowing the Western "Rule of Might" and "seeking a civilisation of peace and equality and the emancipation of all races."

== Relationship with Japan ==
=== Meiji Restoration and Sun Yat-sen's Revolutionary Views ===
According to Hosaka Masayasu, one of the reasons why figures like Miyazaki Toten, Yamada Yoshimasa, and Yamada Junzaburo supported Sun Yat-sen's revolutionary movement was because the ideals of the Meiji Restoration or the Freedom and People's Rights Movement could not be realized in Japan, and they sought to compensate for that failure.

However, Sun Yat-sen himself stated the following in 1919:

The Chinese Nationalist Party is, after all, the revolutionaries of Japan from 50 years ago. Japan, a weak country in the East, was fortunate to have revolutionaries from the Meiji Restoration, who, for the first time, rallied and transformed Japan from a weak country to a strong one. Our revolutionaries also followed the path of Japan's revolutionaries, seeking to transform China.

In 1923, he also said:

Japan's Meiji Restoration was the cause of the Chinese revolution, and the Chinese revolution was the result of Japan's Meiji Restoration. Both are originally connected and work together to achieve the revival of East Asia.

Based on his empathy for the Meiji Restoration, Sun Yat-sen sought collaboration between Japan and China. For him, Japan's Twenty-One Demands on China represented a betrayal of the "revolutionary aspirations" of the Meiji patriots and advanced Japan's policy of aggression against China.

=== Relationship with the Japanese ===
During his lifetime, Sun Yat-sen had a wide range of relationships with Japanese people. His second wife, Kaoru Otsuki, was Japanese. Through the mediation of Inukai Tsuyoshi, he became acquainted with Miyazaki Toten, Tōyama Mitsuru, and Uchida Ryōhei, with whom he also had ideological exchanges and received financial support. In addition, he received financial aid from businessmen such as Matsukata Kōjirō, Yasukawa Keiichirō, stock trader Suzuki Kugorou, and Umeya Shōkichi. One of his supporters during his stay in Japan was also the great-grandfather of manga artist Shibata Ami.

Additionally, Sasaki Tōichi of the Imperial Japanese Army served as a military advisor to Sun. He also became friends with Minakata Kumagusu, and their friendship deepened after they met while Sun was in exile in London.

=== Great Asianism Lecture ===
The Great Asianism Lecture refers to the speech given by Sun Yat-sen on 29 November 1924, the day after his meeting with Tōyama Mitsuru in Kobe. It was delivered at the auditorium of the Kobe Prefectural Girls' High School, located where the current Hyogo Prefectural Government Office is, to five organizations, including the Kobe Chamber of Commerce. This speech distinguished between the "kingly way" of the East and the "hegemonic way" of the West, praising the kingly way of the East, and condemning Japan's tilt towards hegemonic ways due to excess, while also praising Japan's modernization as a leader in this regard.

You Japanese people have adopted the hegemonic cultural ways of the West, while also possessing the essence of the kingly way of Asian culture. However, as you look toward the future of world culture, the question remains: will you ultimately become the tools of the Western hegemonic ways, or will you stand as a barrier to the Eastern kingly way? This depends on your careful consideration and deliberate choices.

This speech criticized Western colonialism while praising Japan's modernization and civilization. It also criticized Japan for becoming a follower of Western colonialism and advocated for cooperation among Asians.

== Family ==
Partners of Sun Yat-sen

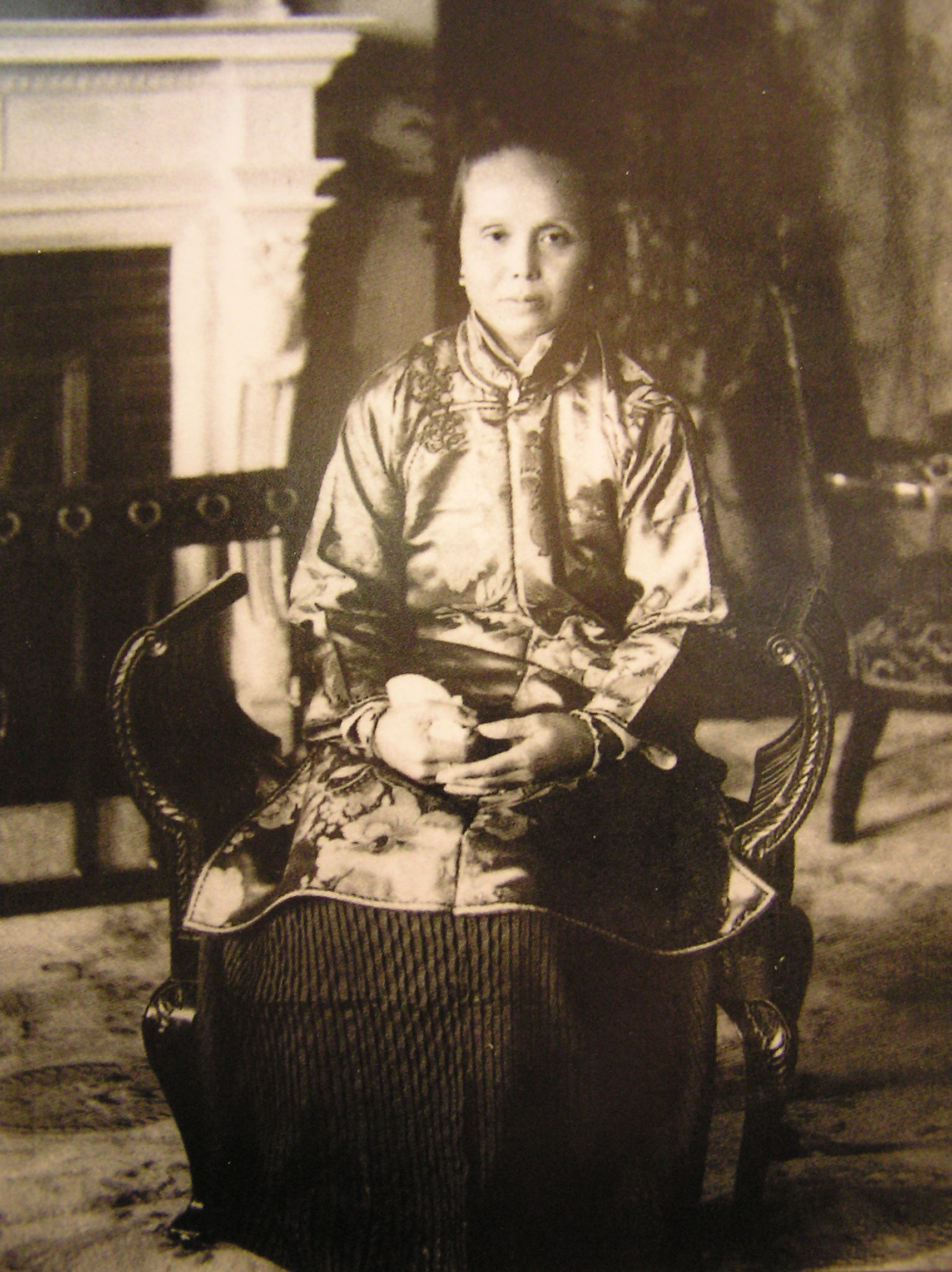
Lu Muzhen (1867–1952, m. 1885–1915)

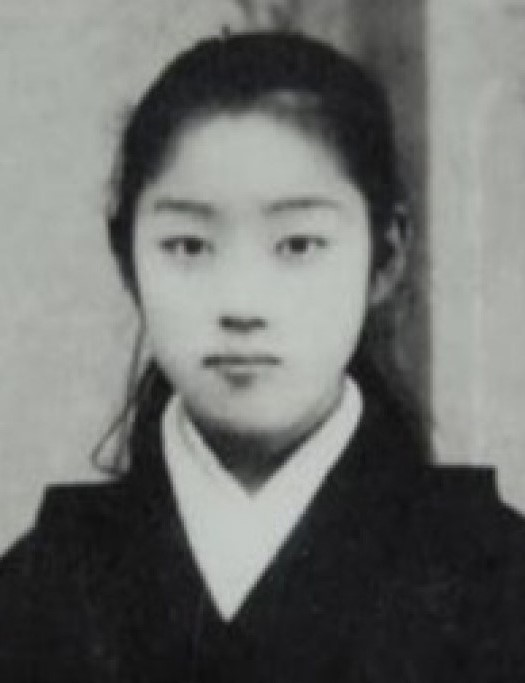
Kaoru Otsuki (1888–1970, m. 1905–1906)

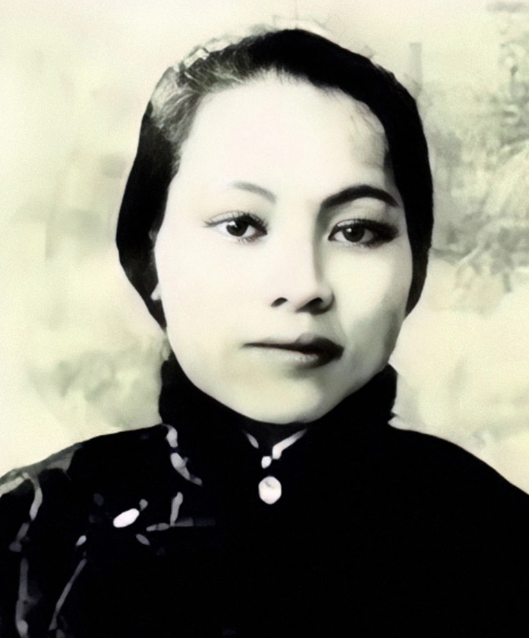
Chen Cuifen (1874–1962, m. 1905–?)

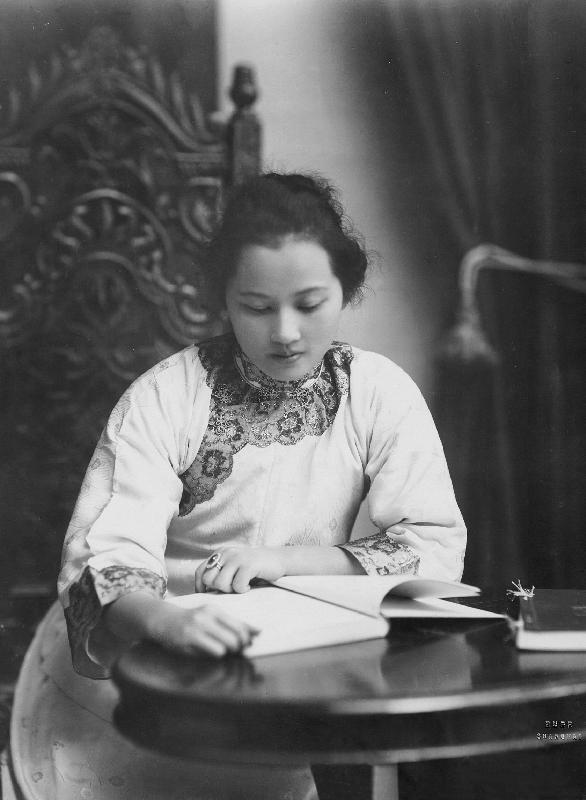
Soong Ching Ling (1893–1981, m. 1915–1925)

Sun Yat-sen was born to Sun Dacheng (孫達成) and his wife, Lady Yang (楊氏) on 12 November 1866. At the time, his father was 53, and his mother was 38 years old. He had an older brother, Sun Dezhang (孫德彰), and an older sister, Sun Jinxing (孫金星), who died at the early age of 4. Another older brother, Sun Deyou (孫德祐), died at the age of 6. He also had an older sister, Sun Miaoqian (孫妙茜), and a younger sister, Sun Qiuqi (孫秋綺).

At age 20, Sun had an arranged marriage with the fellow villager Lu Muzhen. She bore a son, Sun Fo, and two daughters, Sun Jinyuan (孫金媛) and Sun Jinwan (孫金婉). Sun Fo was the grandfather of Leland Sun, who spent 37 years working in Hollywood as an actor and stuntman. Sun Yat-sen was also the godfather of Paul Myron Anthony Linebarger, an American author and poet who wrote under the name Cordwainer Smith.

Sun's first concubine, the Hong Kong–born Chen Cuifen, lived in Taiping, Perak (now in Malaysia) for 17 years. The couple adopted a local girl as their daughter. Cuifen subsequently relocated to China, where she died.

During Sun's exile in Japan, he had relationships with two Japanese women: the 15-year-old Haru Asada, whom he took as a concubine up to her death in 1902, and another 15-year-old schoolgirl, Kaoru Otsuki, whom Sun married in 1905 and abandoned the next year while she was pregnant. Otsuki later had their daughter, Fumiko, adopted by the Miyagawa family in Yokohama, who did not discover her parentage until 1951, 26 years after Sun's death.

On 25 October 1915 in Japan, Sun married Soong Ching-ling, one of the Soong sisters. Soong Ching-ling's father was the American-educated Methodist minister Charles Soong, who made a fortune in banking and in printing of Bibles. Although Charles had been a personal friend of Sun, he was enraged by Sun announcing his intention to marry Ching-ling because while Sun was a Christian, he kept two wives: Lu Muzhen and Kaoru Otsuki. Soong viewed Sun's actions as running directly against their shared religion.

Soong Ching-Ling's sister, Soong Mei-ling, later married Chiang Kai-shek.

== Cultural references ==
=== Memorials and structures in Asia ===
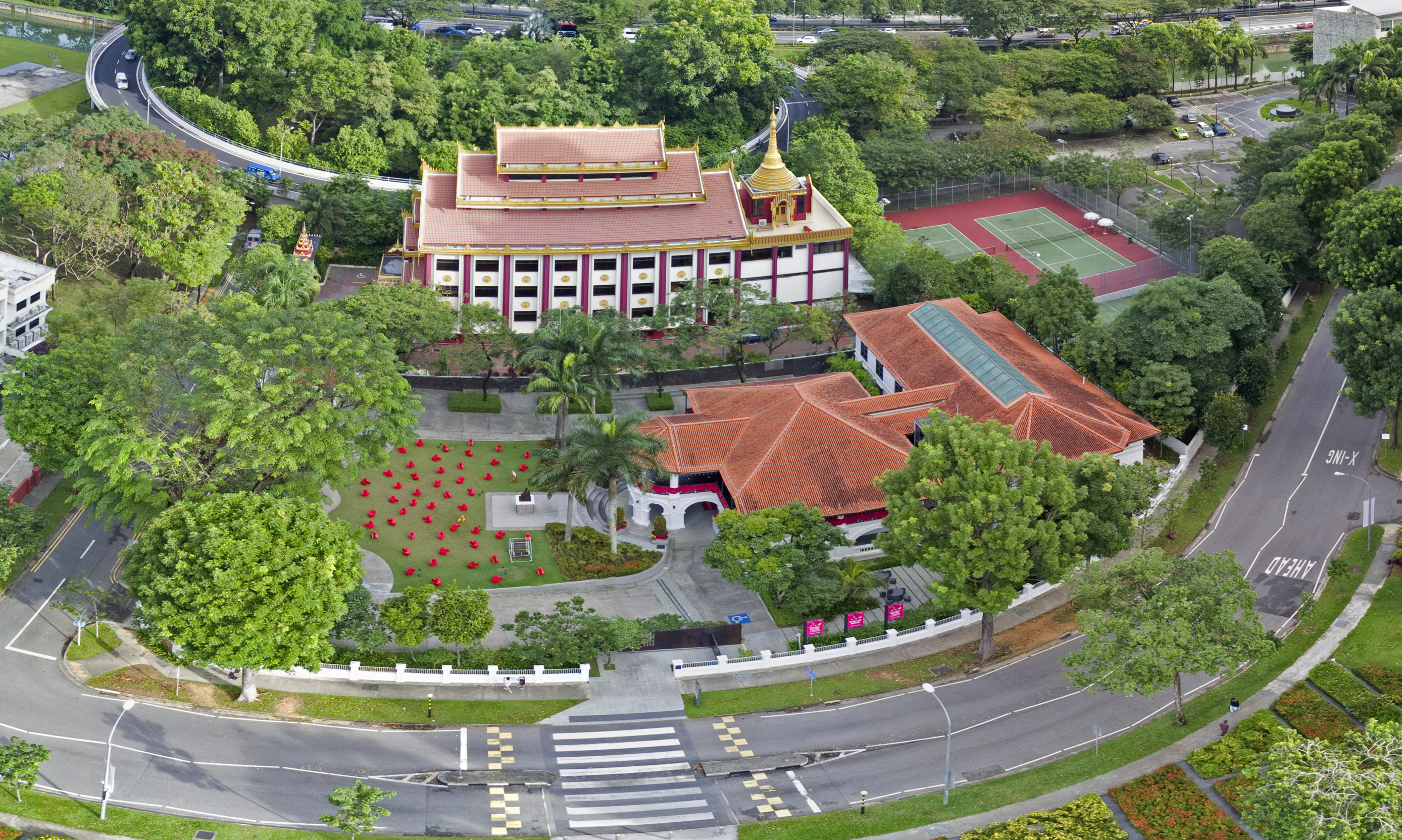
Aerial perspective of Sun Yat Sen Nanyang Memorial Hall, in central Singapore, taken in 2016

In most major Chinese cities, one of the main streets is Zhongshan Lu (中山路) to celebrate Sun's memory. There are also numerous parks, schools, and geographical features named after him. Xiangshan, Sun's hometown in Guangdong, was renamed Zhongshan in his honor, and there is a hall dedicated to his memory at the Temple of Azure Clouds in Beijing. There are also a series of Sun Yat-sen stamps.

Other references to Sun include the Sun Yat-sen University in Guangzhou and National Sun Yat-sen University in Kaohsiung. Other structures include Sun Yat-sen Mausoleum, Sun Yat-sen Memorial Hall subway station, Sun Yat-sen house in Nanjing, Dr Sun Yat-sen Museum in Hong Kong, Chung-Shan Building, Sun Yat-sen Memorial Hall in Guangzhou, Sun Yat-sen Memorial Hall in Taipei and Sun Yat Sen Nanyang Memorial Hall in Singapore. Zhongshan Memorial Middle School has also been a name used by many schools. Zhongshan Park is also a common name used for a number of places named after him. The first highway in Taiwan is called the Sun Yat-sen expressway. Two ships are also named after him; the Chinese gunboat Chung Shan and the Chinese cruiser Yat Sen. The old Chinatown in Calcutta (now known as Kolkata), India, has the prominent Sun Yat-sen Street.

In Russia, a village in Mikhaylovsky District of Primorsky Krai was named Sunyatsenskoe in honor of him. There are streets named after him in Astrakhan, Ufa and Aldan. There was a street that was named after Sun in the Russian city of Omsk until 2005, when it was renamed in honor of the recipient of the title Hero of Soviet Union Mikhail Ivanovich Leonov.

In George Town, Penang, Malaysia, the Penang Philomatic Union had its premises at 120 Armenian Street in 1910, while Sun spent more than four months in Penang and convened the historic "Penang Conference" to launch the fundraising campaign for the Huanghuagang Uprising and founded the Kwong Wah Yit Poh. The house, which has been preserved as the Sun Yat-sen Museum (formerly called the Sun Yat Sen Penang Base), was visited by President-designate Hu Jintao in 2002. The Penang Philomatic Union subsequently moved to a bungalow at 65 Macalister Road, which has been preserved as the Sun Yat-sen Memorial Centre Penang.

As a dedication, the 1966 Chinese Cultural Renaissance was launched on Sun's birthday on 12 November.

The Nanyang Wan Qing Yuan in Singapore have since been preserved and renamed as the Sun Yat Sen Nanyang Memorial Hall. A Sun Yat-sen heritage trail was also launched on 20 November 2010 in Penang.

Sun's Hawaiian birth certificate, which claimed that he was not born in China but in the United States, was on public display at the American Institute in Taiwan on US Independence Day on 4 July 2011.

A street in Medan, Indonesia, is named "Jalan Sun Yat-Sen" in honor of him.

A street named "Tôn Dật Tiên" (the Sino-Vietnamese name for Sun Yat-Sen) is located in Phú Mỹ Hưng urban area, Ho Chi Minh City, Vietnam.

The "Trail of Dr. Sun Yat Sen and His Comrades in Ipoh" was established in 2019, based on the book "Road to Revolution: Dr. Sun Yat Sen and His Comrades in Ipoh."

==== Gallery ====
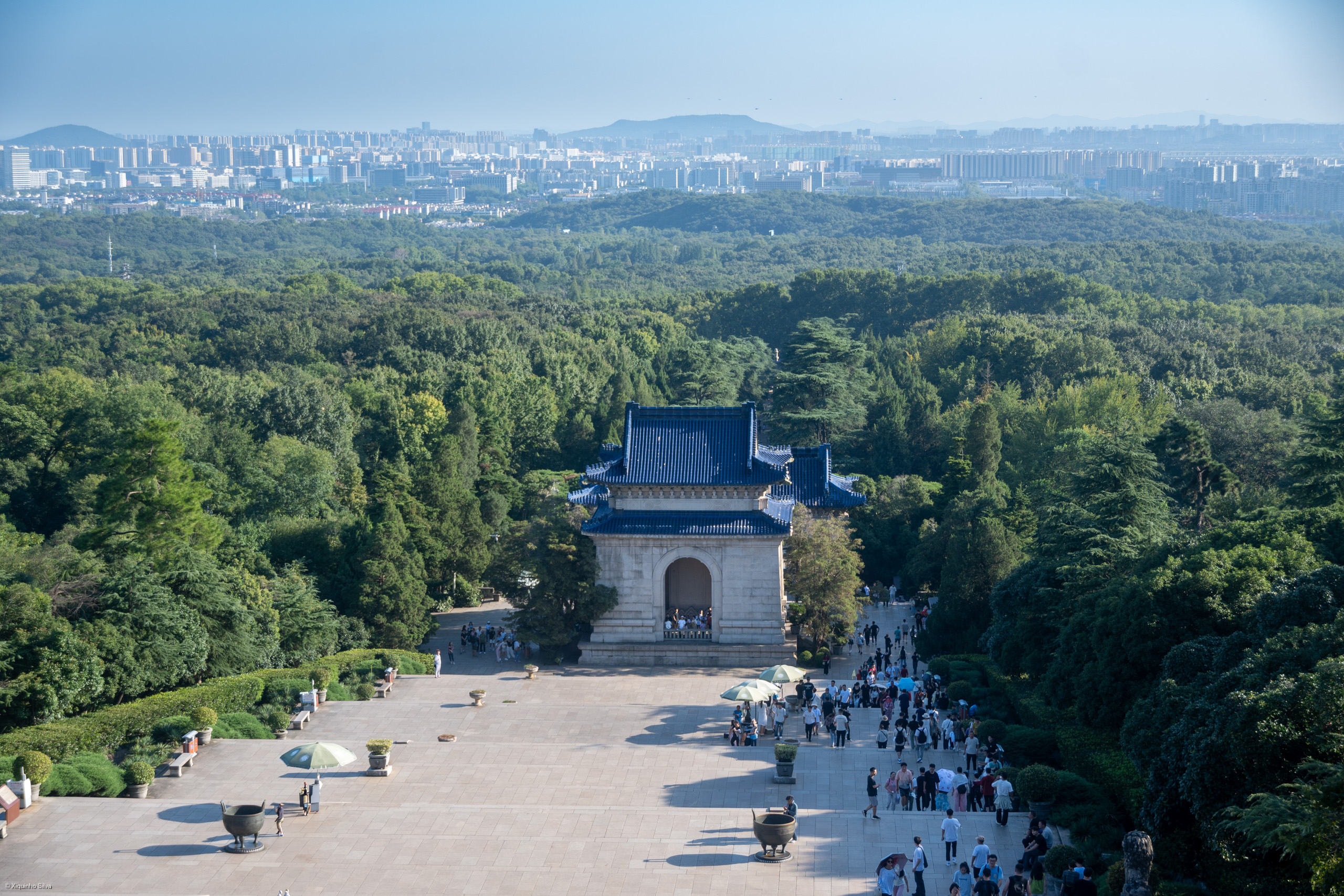
Mausoleum of Sun Yat-sen, Nanjing

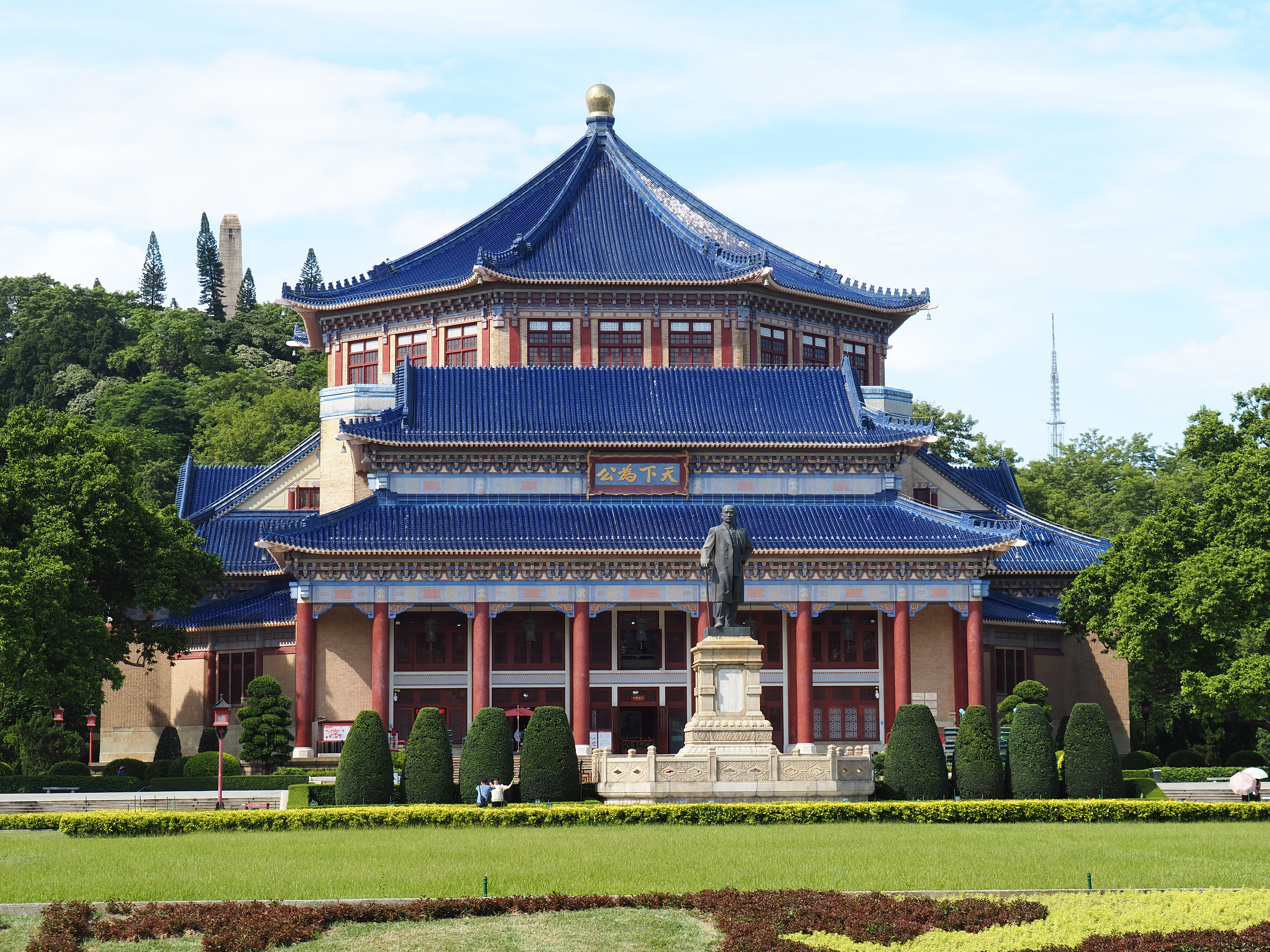
Sun Yat-sen Memorial Hall, Guangzhou

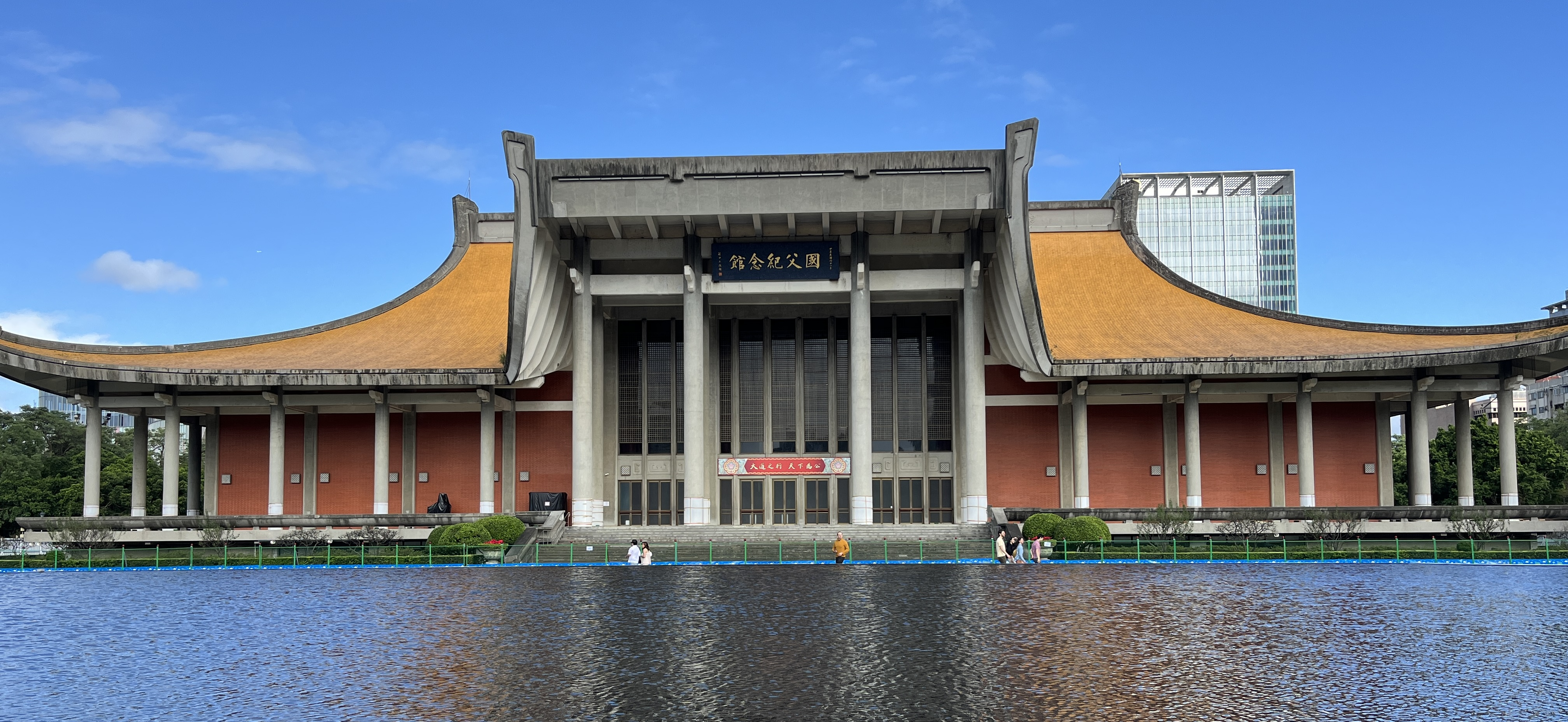
Sun Yat-sen Memorial Hall, Taipei

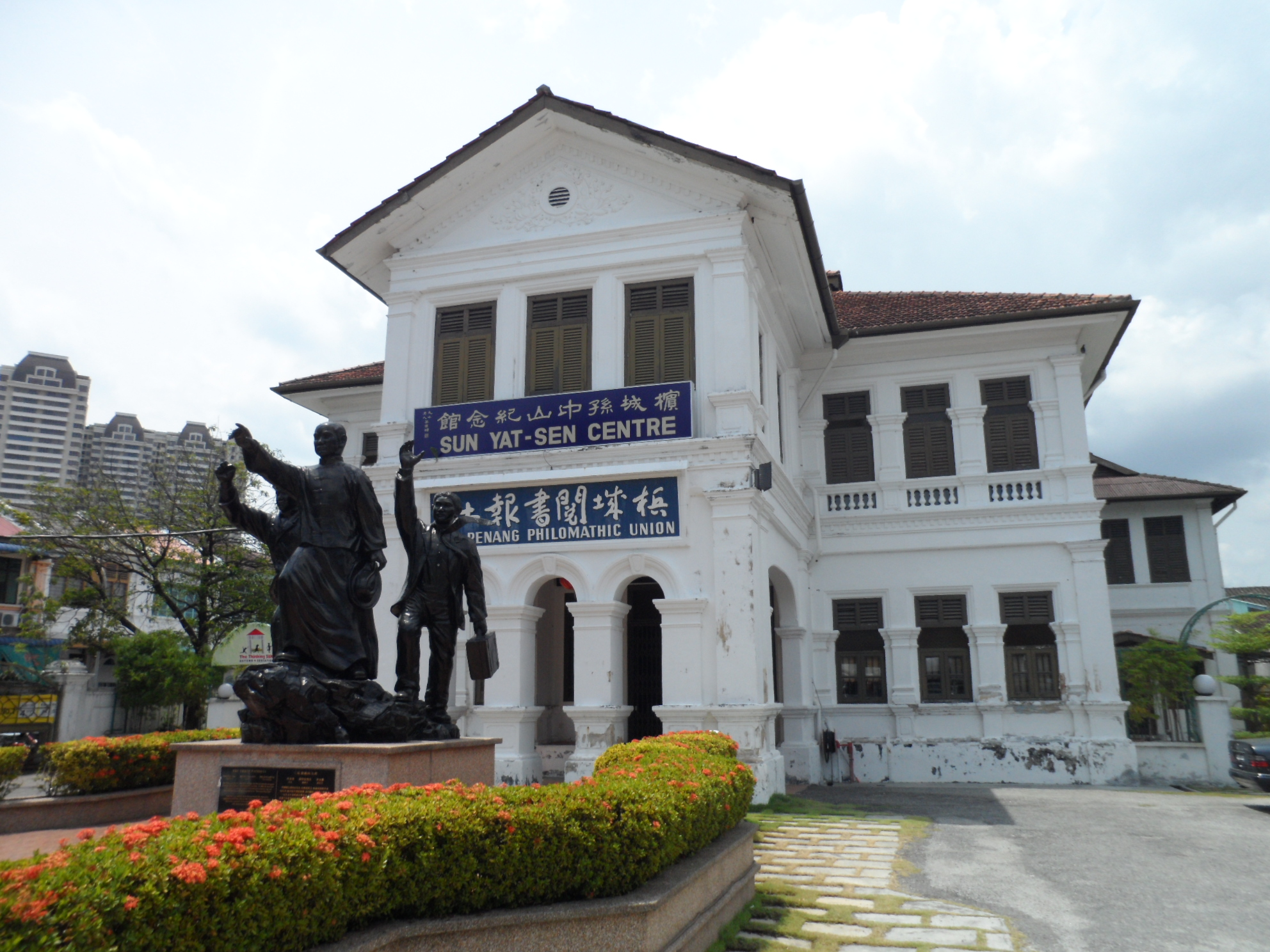
Sun Yat-sen Memorial Centre, George Town, Penang, Malaysia

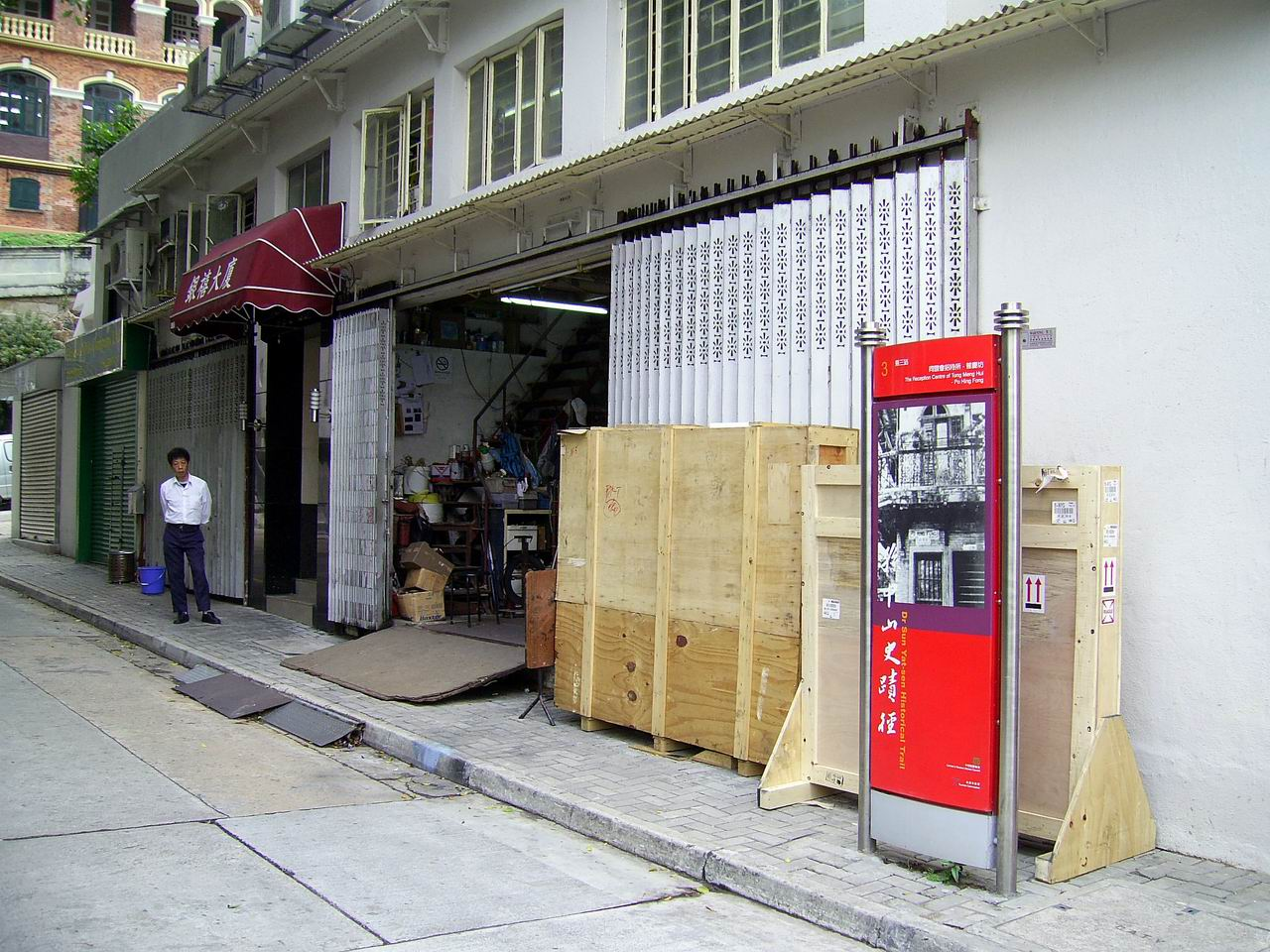
A marker on the Sun Yat-sen Historical Trail, Hong Kong

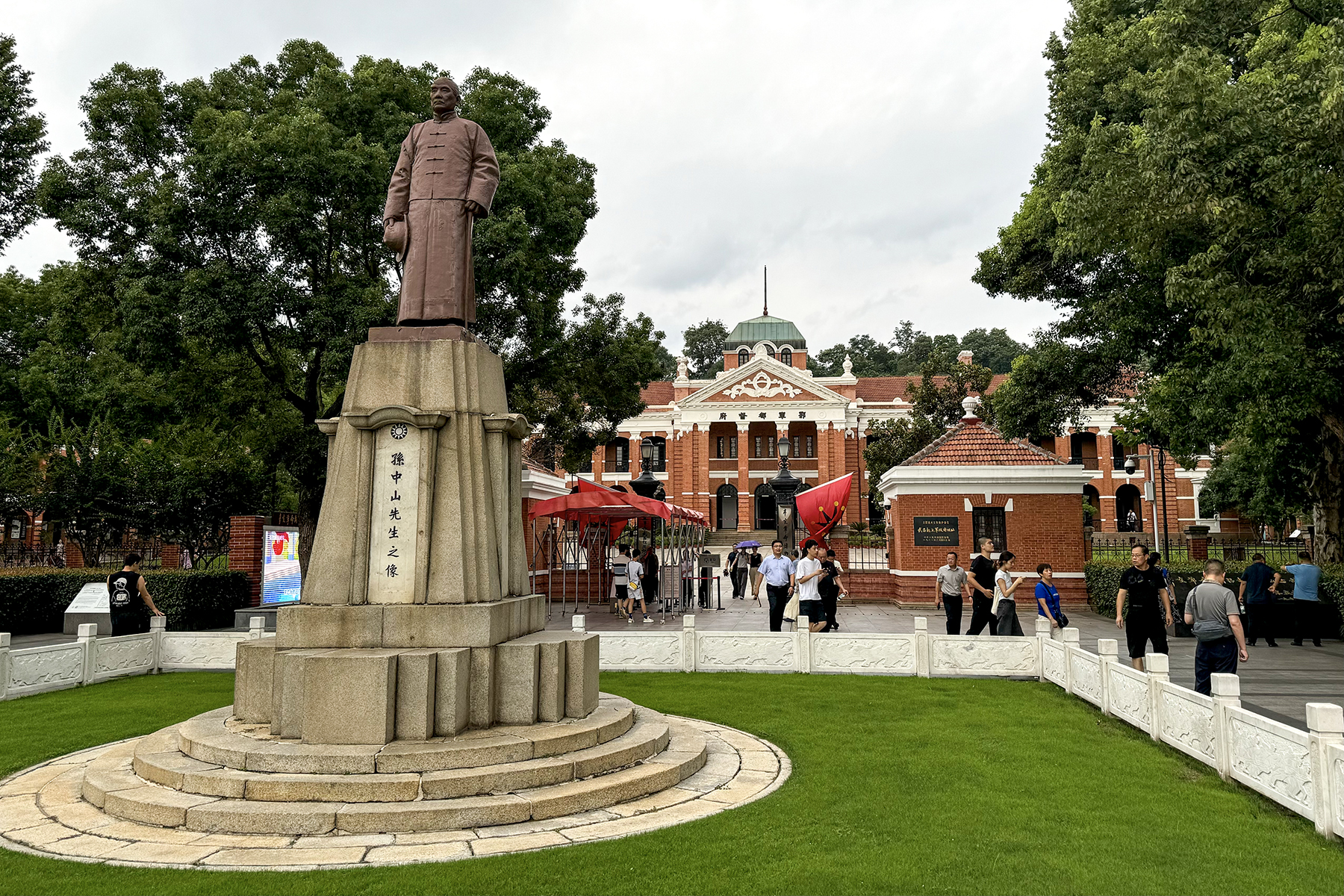
Statue of Sun Yat-sen before the site of Provisional Military Government of Wuchang Uprising, Wuhan

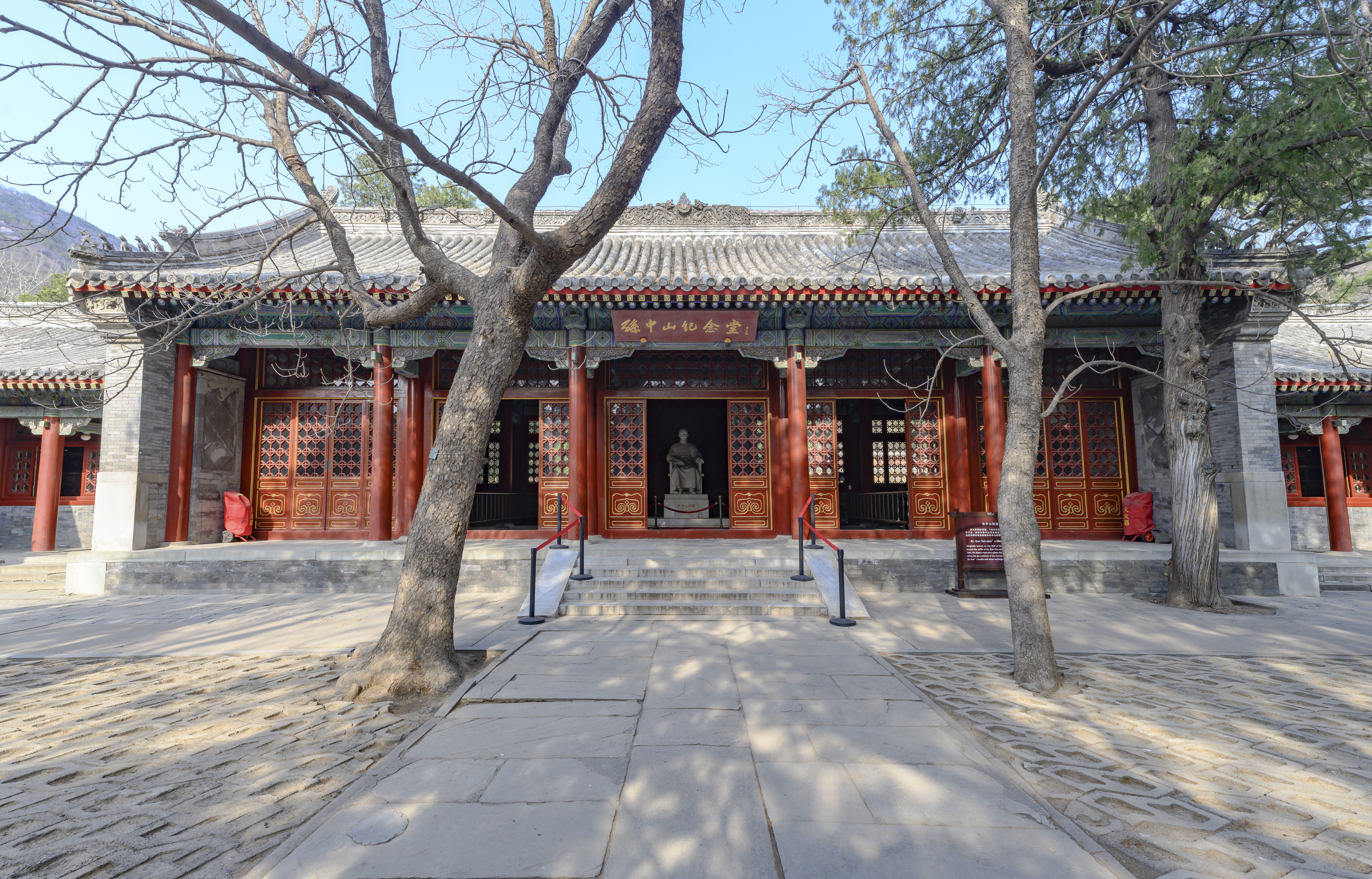
Sun Yat-sen Memorial Hall at Temple of Azure Clouds, Beijing

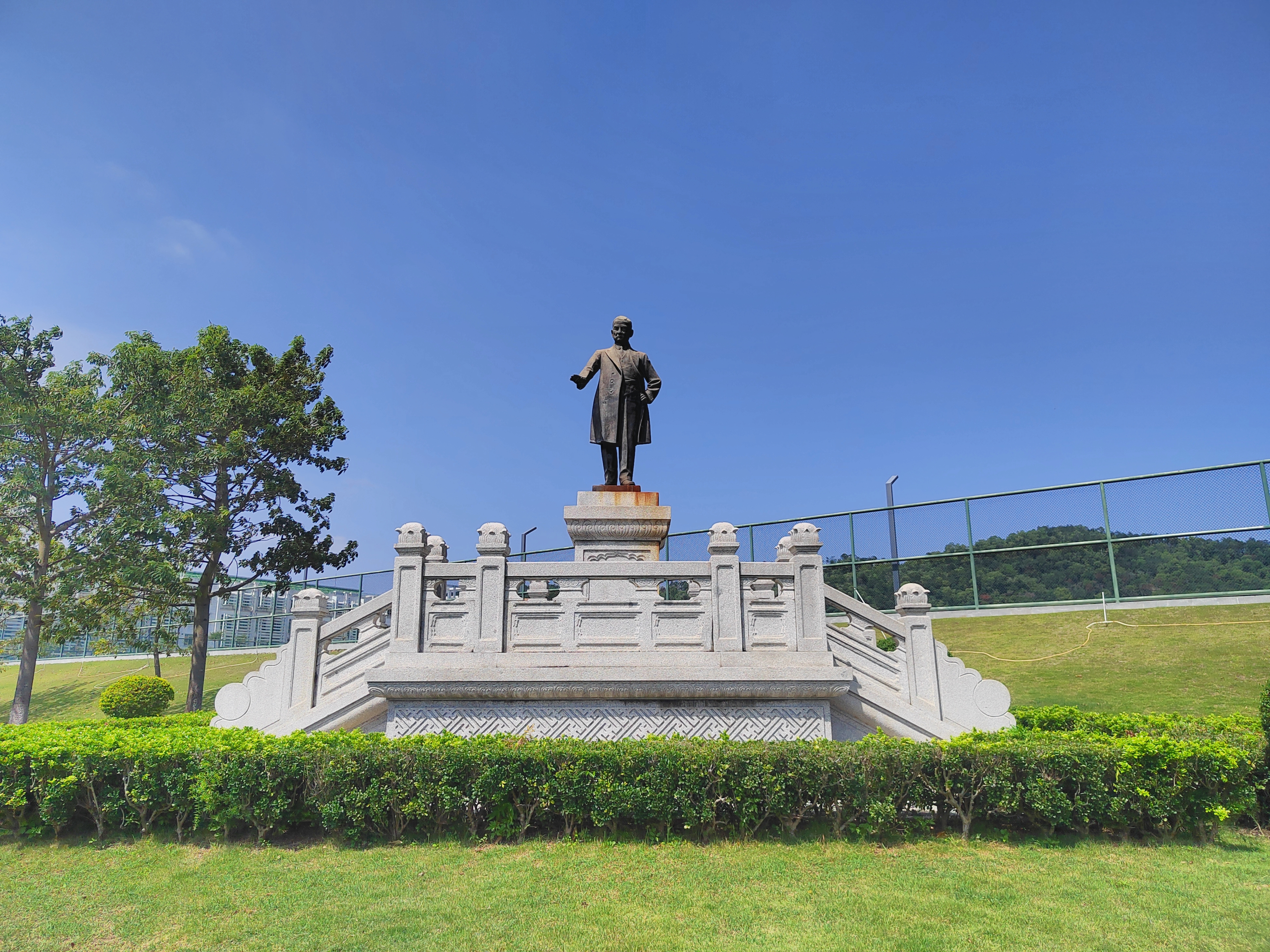
Bronze statue in the campus of Sun Yat-sen University, originally made and given by Umeya Shokichi

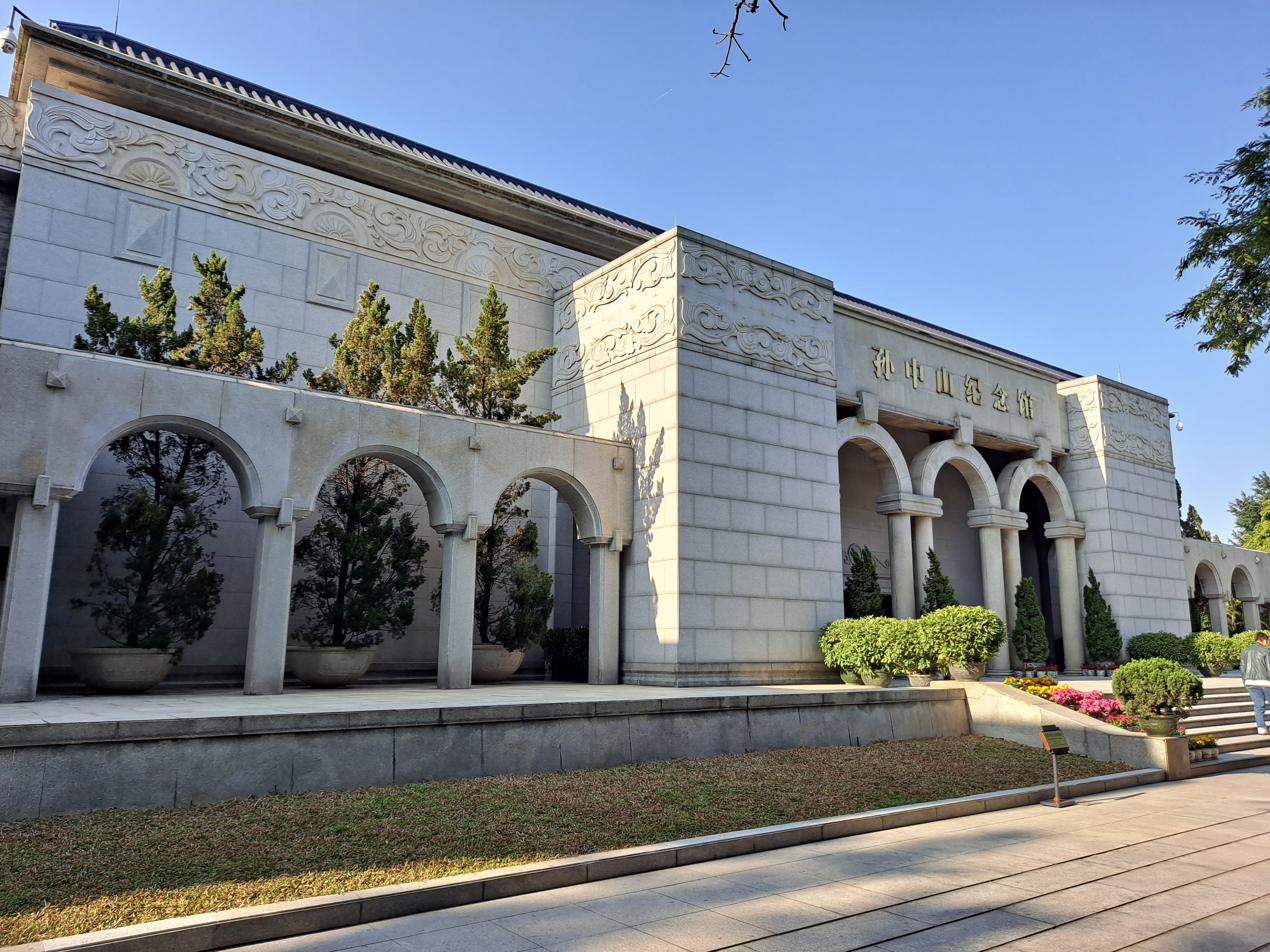
The Museum of Dr. Sun Yat-sen in Cuiheng, Guangdong

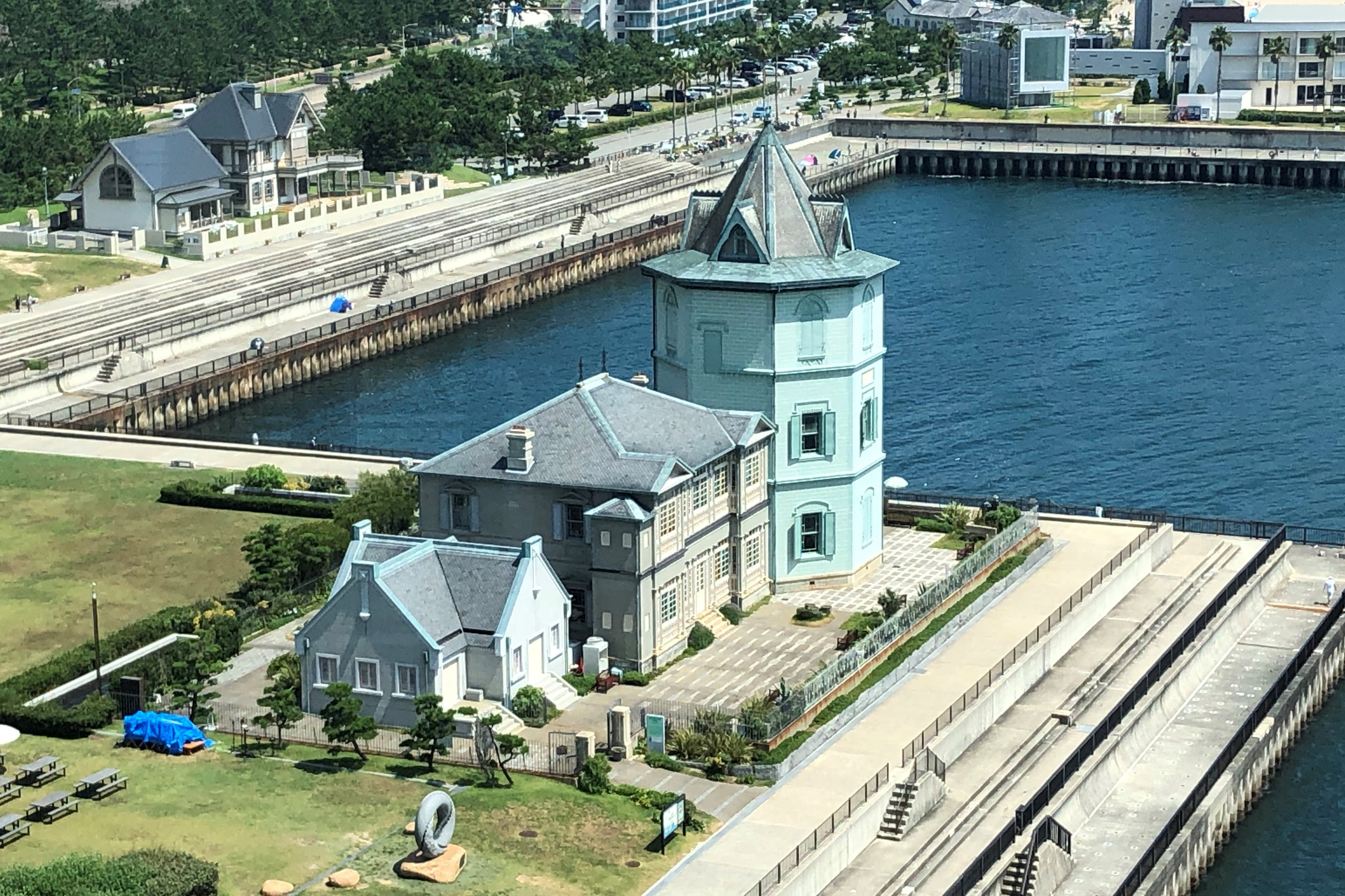
Sun Yat-sen Memorial Hall (Ijokaku), Kobe, Japan

=== Memorials and structures outside Asia ===
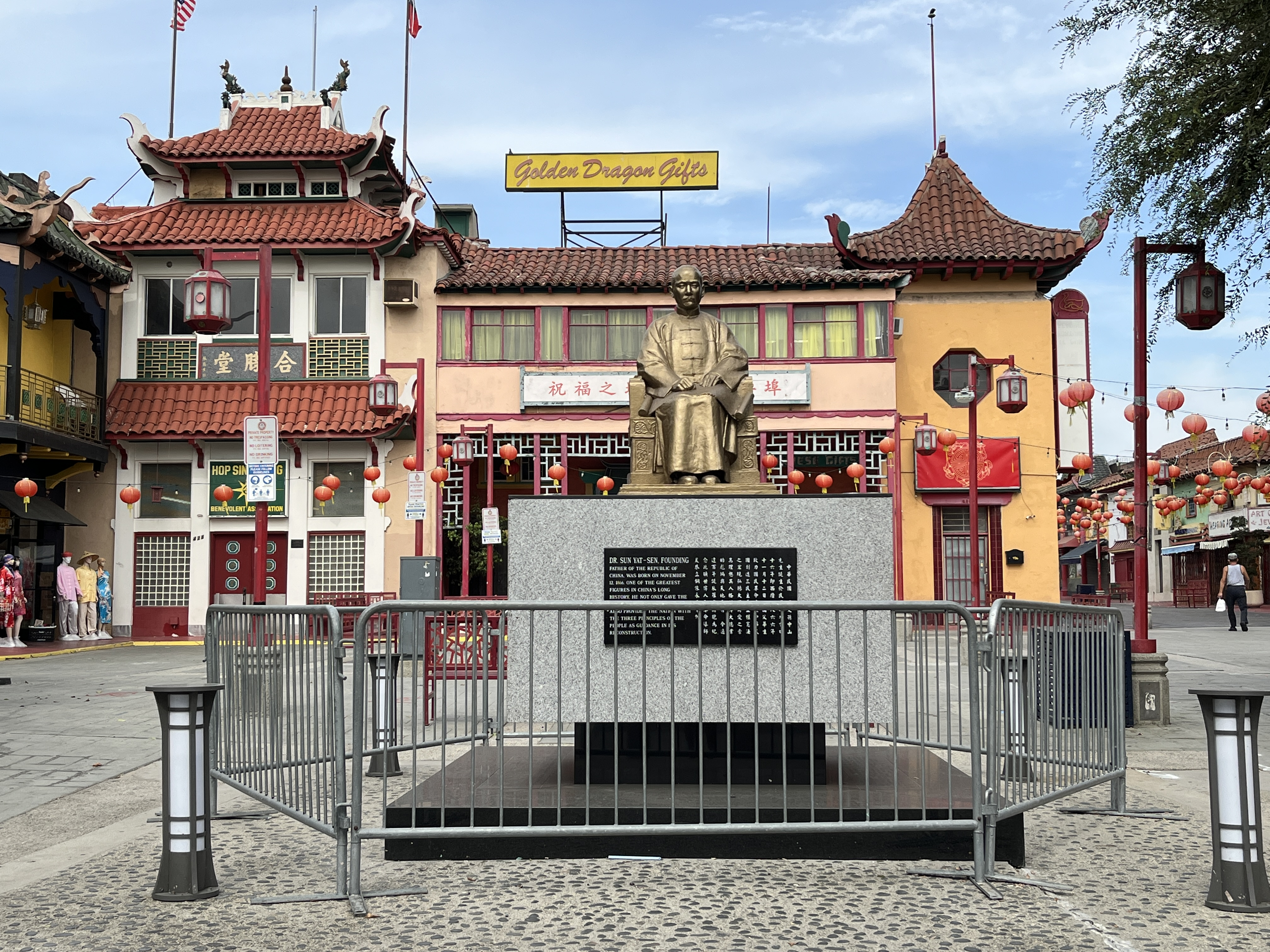
Sun Yat-Sen monument in Chinatown of Los Angeles, California

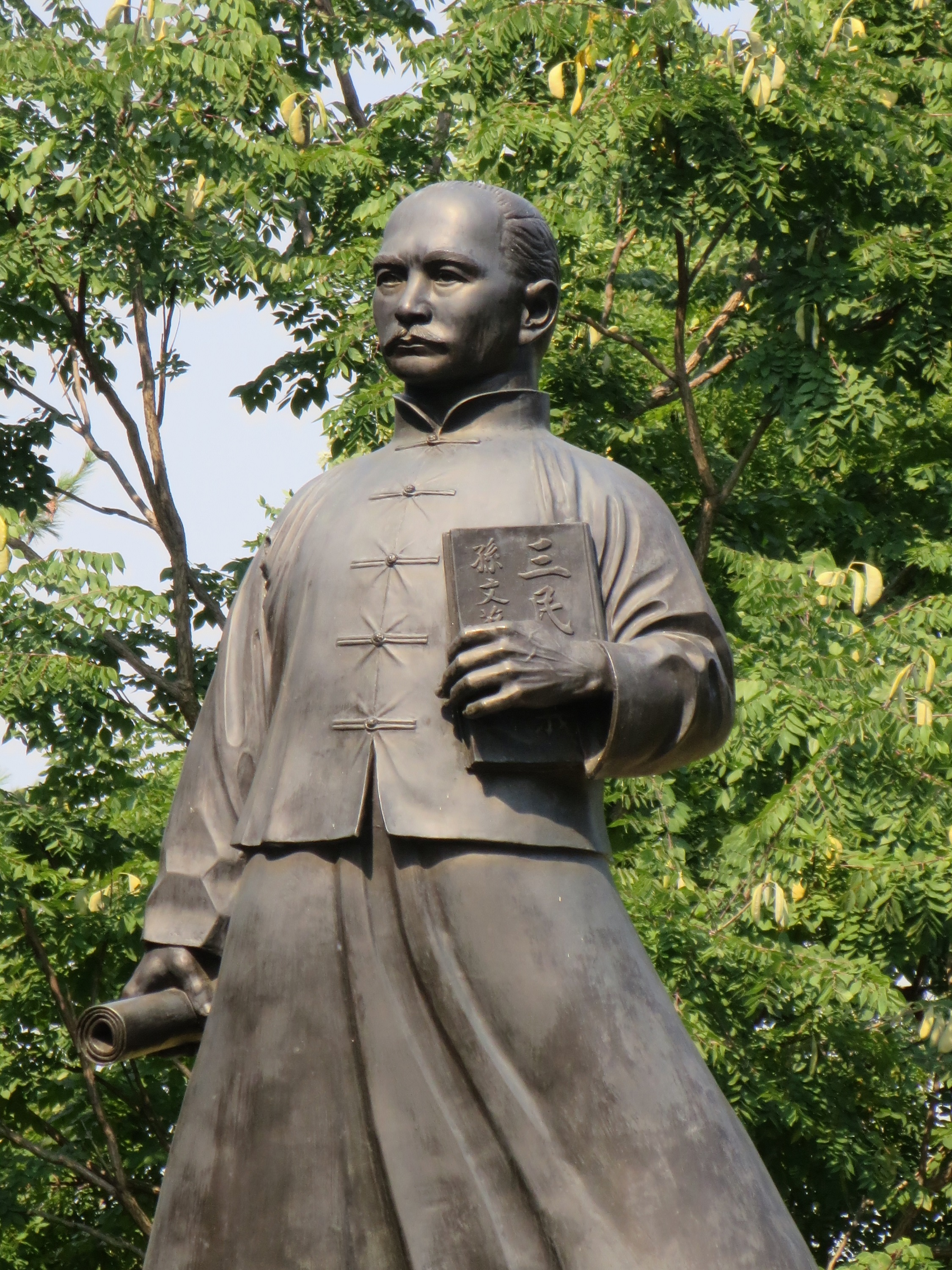
Sun Yat-Sen sculpture by Joe Rosenthal at Riverdale Park in Toronto

St. John's University, in New York City, has a facility built in 1973, the Sun Yat-Sen Memorial Hall, which built to resemble a traditional Chinese building in honor of Sun. Dr. Sun Yat-Sen Classical Chinese Garden, located in Vancouver, is the largest classical Chinese gardens outside Asia. The Dr. Sun Yat-sen Memorial Park is in Chinatown, Honolulu. On the island of Maui, the little Sun Yat-sen Park at Kamaole is near where his older brother had a ranch on the slopes of Haleakala in the Kula region.

In Los Angeles, there is a seated statue of him in Central Plaza. In Sacramento, California, there is a bronze statue of Sun in front of the Chinese Benevolent Association of Sacramento. Another statue of Sun, by Joe Rosenthal, can be found at Riverdale Park in Toronto, Ontario, Canada, and there is another statue in Toronto's downtown Chinatown. There is also the Moscow Sun Yat-sen University. In Chinatown, San Francisco is a 12-foot statue of Sun on Saint Mary's Square.

In late 2011, the Chinese Youth Society of Melbourne, in celebration of the 100th anniversary of the founding of the Republic of China, unveiled in a lion dance blessing ceremony a memorial statue of Sun outside the Chinese Museum in the city's Chinatown on the spot that its traditional Chinese New Year lion dance always ends.

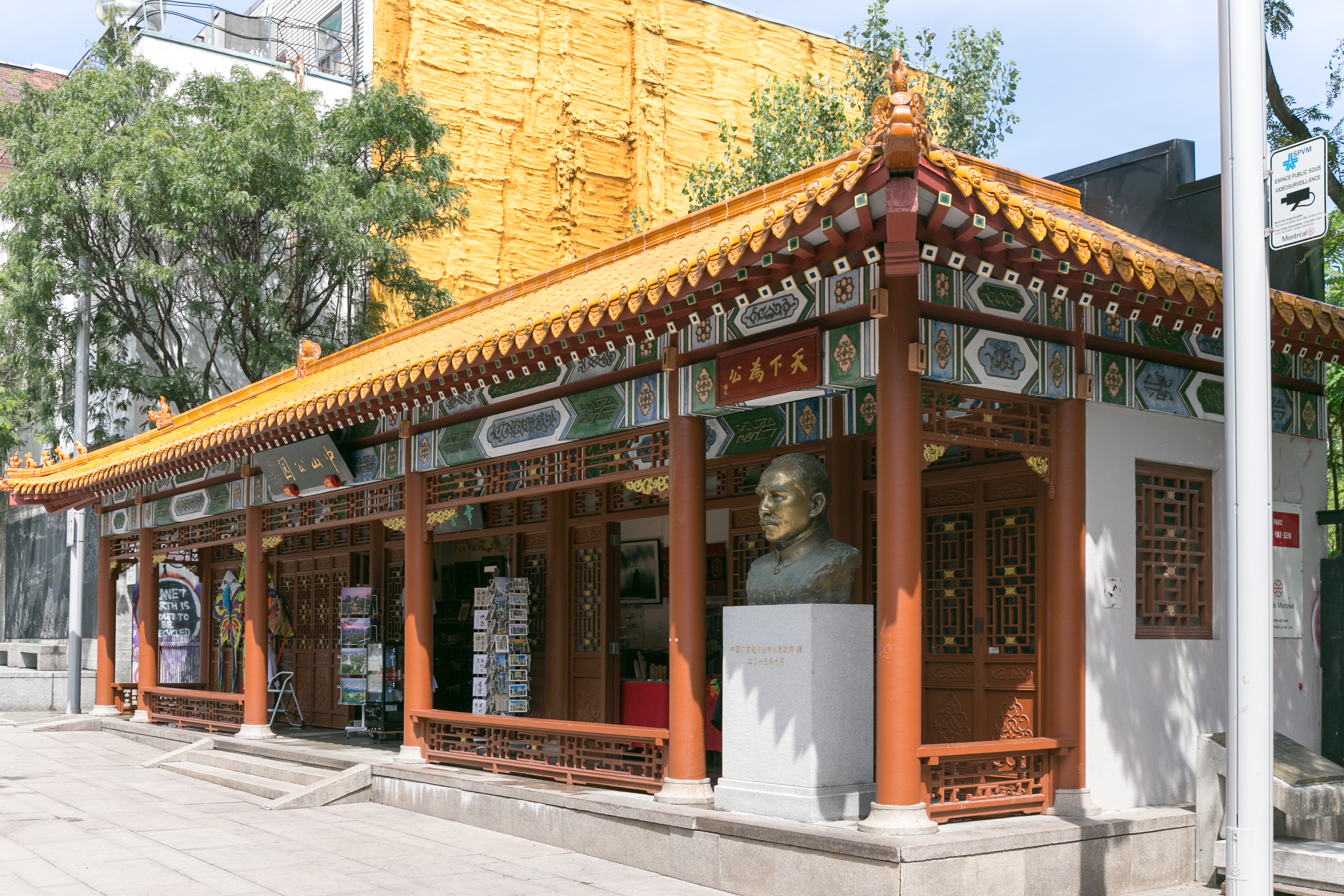
Sun Yat-Sen plaza in the Chinese Quarter of Montreal, Quebec

In 1993, Lily Sun, one of Sun Yat-sen's granddaughters, donated books, photographs, artwork and other memorabilia to the Kapiʻolani Community College library as part of the Sun Yat-sen Asian Collection. During October and November every year the entire collection is shown. In 1997, the Dr Sun Yat-sen Hawaii Foundation was formed online as a virtual library. In 2006, the NASA Mars Exploration Rover Spirit called one of the hills that was explored "Zhongshan."

In 2019, a statue of Dr. Sun Yat-sen by Lu Chun-Hsiung and Michael Kang was permanently installed in the northern plaza of Manhattan's Columbus Park.

== In popular culture ==
=== Opera ===
Dr. Sun Yat-sen (中山逸仙; ZhōngShān yì xiān) is a 2011 Chinese-language western-style opera in three acts by the New York-based American composer Huang Ruo, who was born in China and is a graduate of Oberlin College's Conservatory as well as the Juilliard School. The libretto was written by Candace Mui-ngam Chong, a recent collaborator with playwright David Henry Hwang. It was performed in Hong Kong in October 2011 and was given its North America premiere on 26 July 2014 at the Santa Fe Opera.

=== Television series and films ===
Sun Yat-sen's life is portrayed in various films, mainly The Soong Sisters and Road to Dawn. A fictionalized assassination attempt on his life was featured in Bodyguards and Assassins. He is also portrayed during his struggle to overthrow the Qing dynasty in Once Upon a Time in China II. The television series Towards the Republic features Ma Shaohua as Sun. In 1911, a film commemoration of the 100th anniversary of the Chinese Revolution, Winston Chao played Sun. In Space: Above and Beyond, one of the starships of the China Navy is named the Sun Yat-sen.

=== Performances ===
In 2010, the theatrical play Yellow Flower on Slopes (斜路黃花) was created and performed.

In 2011, the Mandopop group Zhongsan Road 100 (中山路100號) was known for singing the song "Our Father of the Nation" (我們國父).

== Works ==
- Kidnapped in London (1897)
- The Outline of National Reconstruction/Chien Kuo Ta Kang (1918)
- The Fundamentals of National Reconstruction/Chien Kuo Fang Lueh (1924)
- The Principle of Nationalism (1953)

== See also ==
- Chiang Kai-shek
- Chiang Ching-kuo
- History of the Republic of China
- Politics of the Republic of China
- Sun Yat-sen Museum Penang
- United States Constitution and worldwide influence
- Zhongshan suit
- Kuomintang
- Three Principles of the People

== Notes ==
Political offices
Preceded by The Xuantong Emperor as Emperor of the Qing dynasty	Head of state of China as Provisional Government of the Republic of China; 1912	Succeeded by Yuan Shikai as Provisional President of the Republic of China
Preceded by Office created	Generalissimo of the Military Government of Nationalist China; 1917–1918	Succeeded by Governing Committee of the Military Government of Nationalist China
Preceded by Himself as Generalissimo of the Military Government of Nationalist China	Member of the Governing Committee of the Military Government of Nationalist China; 1918	Succeeded by Cen Chunxuan as Chairman of the Governing Committee of the Military Government of Nationalist China
Preceded by Cen Chunxuan as Chairman of the Governing Committee of the Military Government of Nationalist China	Extraordinary President of Nationalist China; 1921–1922	Succeeded by Himself as Generalissimo of the National Government of the Republic of China
Preceded by Office created	Generalissimo of the National Government of the Republic of China; 1923–1925	Succeeded by Hu Hanmin; Acting
Party political offices
Preceded by Song Jiaoren as President of the Kuomintang	Premier of the Kuomintang; 1913–1914	Succeeded by Himself as Premier of the Chinese Revolutionary Party
Preceded by Himself as Premier of the Chinese Revolutionary Party	Premier of the Kuomintang; 1919–1925	Succeeded by Zhang Renjie as Chairman
