= Armenian Street, George Town =

Road in the Malaysian state of Penang

Armenian Street
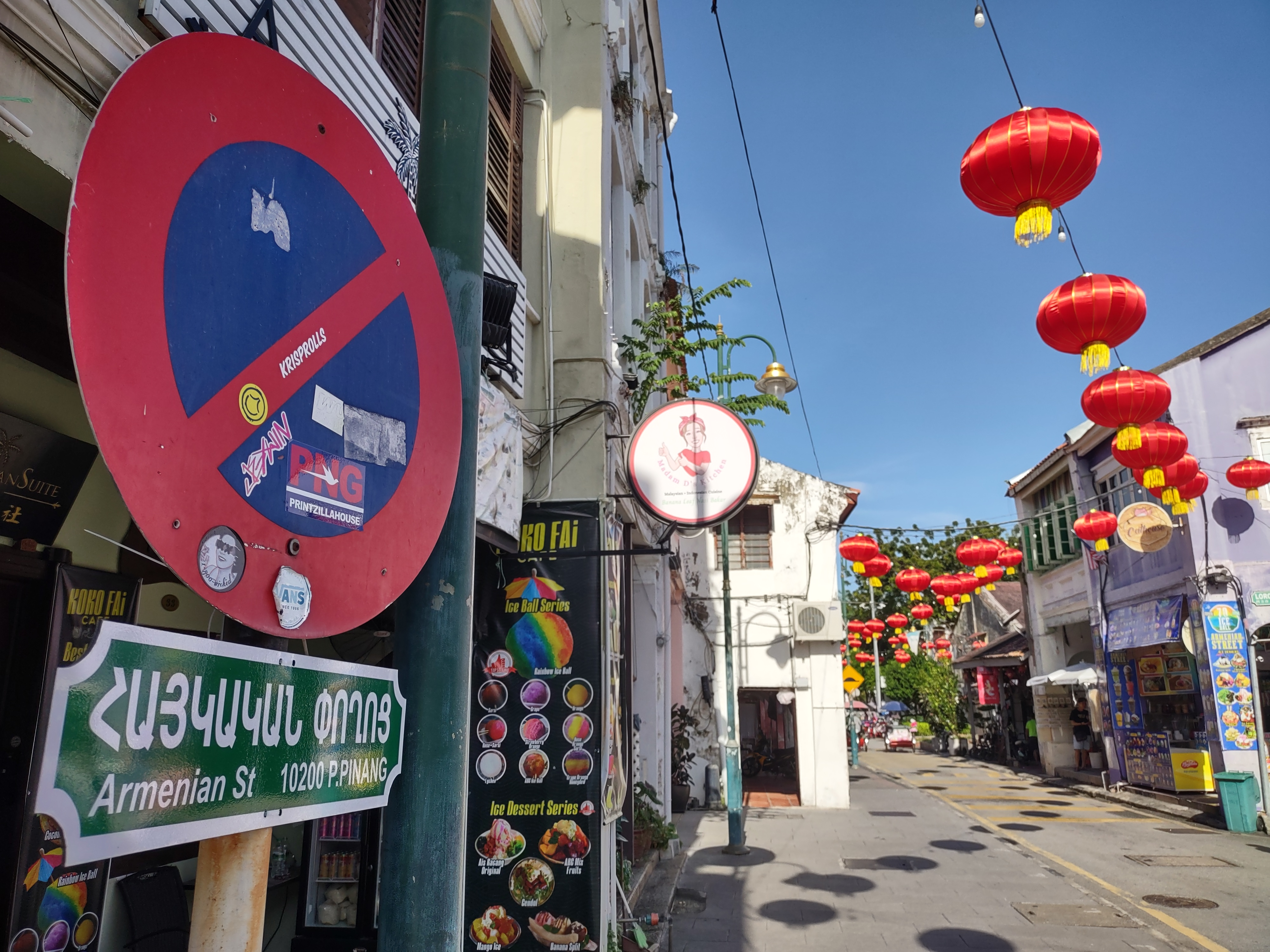
- Interactive map of Armenian Street
- Native name: Malay: Lebuh Armenian; Simplified Chinese: 本头公巷; traditional Chinese: 本頭公巷; Simplified Chinese: 打铜仔街; traditional Chinese: 打銅仔街; Tamil: ஆர்மேனியன் வீதி; Armenian: Հայկական Փողոց
- Maintained by: Penang Island City Council
- Location: George Town
- Coordinates: 5.414744°N 100.338111°E
- West end: Acheen Street
- East end: Beach Street

Construction
- Inauguration: 1808
- LEBUH ARMENIAN Armenian St10200 P. PINANG

UNESCO World Heritage Site
- Type: Cultural
- Criteria: ii, iii, iv
- Designated: 2008 (32nd session)
- Part of: George Town UNESCO Core Zone
- Reference no.: 1223
- Region: Asia-Pacific

Armenian Street is a narrow street in the city of George Town within the Malaysian state of Penang. Located within the city's UNESCO World Heritage Site, the road has gained popularity in recent years for its rich cultural offerings and street art.

One of a number of places in the world that was named after the nation-state of Armenia, Armenian Street was originally part of a Malay settlement. The subsequent influx of Armenians and Chinese helped to shape the street's multicultural character. Notably, Armenian Street was also the site of Sun Yat-sen's Penang conference, which ultimately contributed to the downfall of the Qing Empire in 1911.

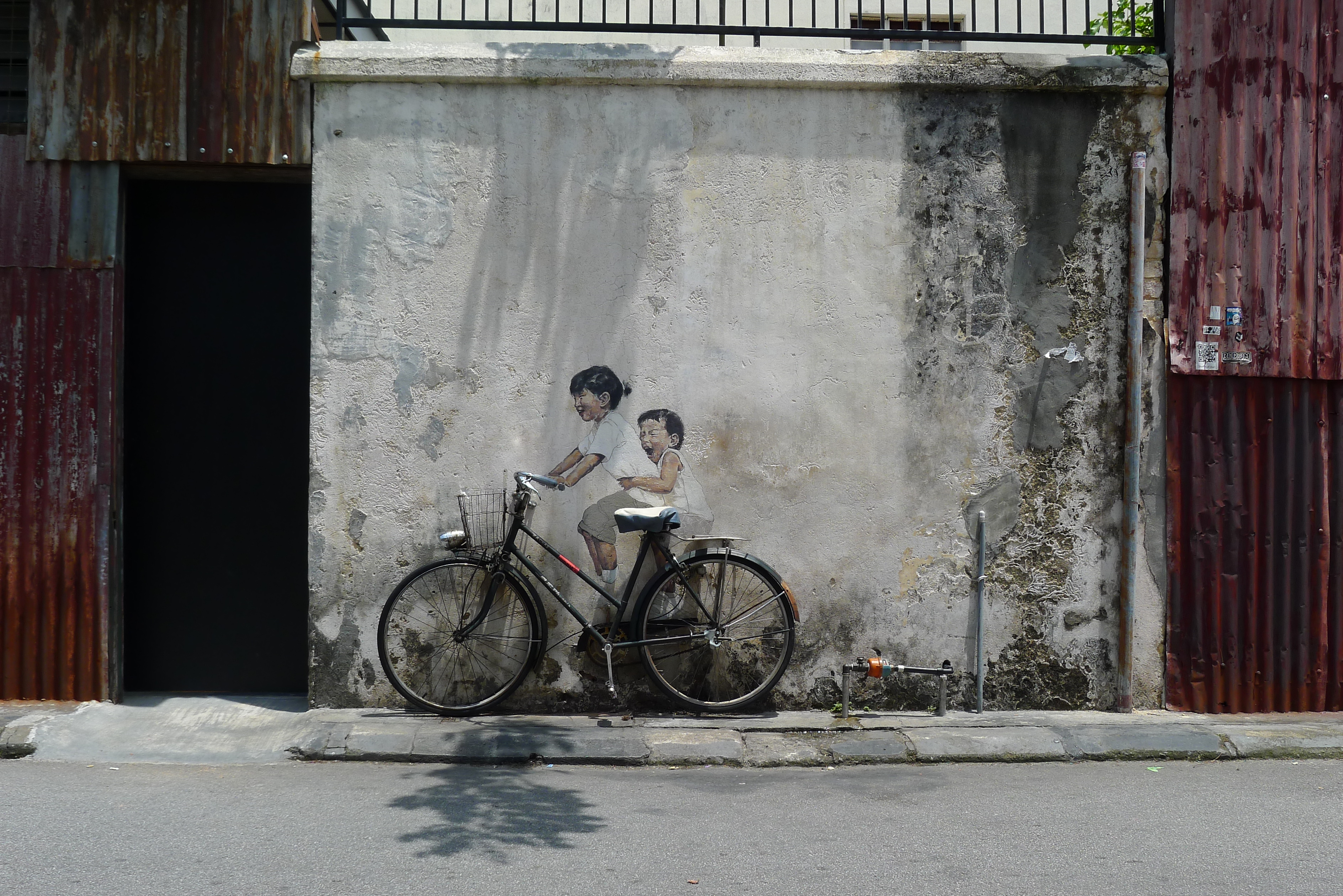
'Children on a Bicycle' by Ernest Zacharevic.

Today, Armenian Street is home to the famous 'Children on a Bicycle' mural by Ernest Zacharevic and various other forms of street art, as well as Chinese clan houses, museums, and shophouses that sell antiques and souvenirs.

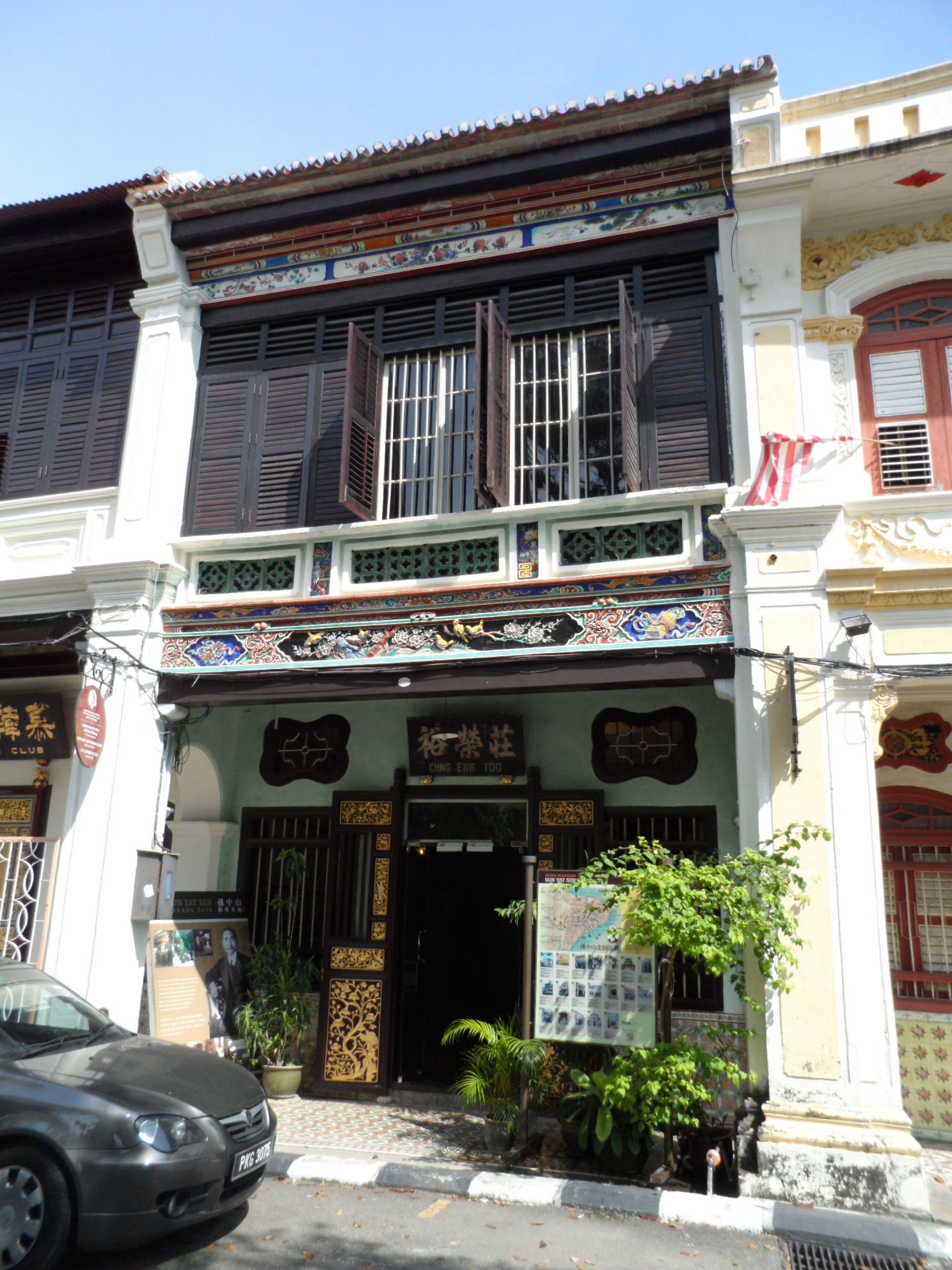
The Sun Yat-sen Museum was launched in 2002 in honour of Sun Yat-sen, who planned the overthrow of the Qing Empire within this building.

Umbrella alley at Armenian Street

== History ==
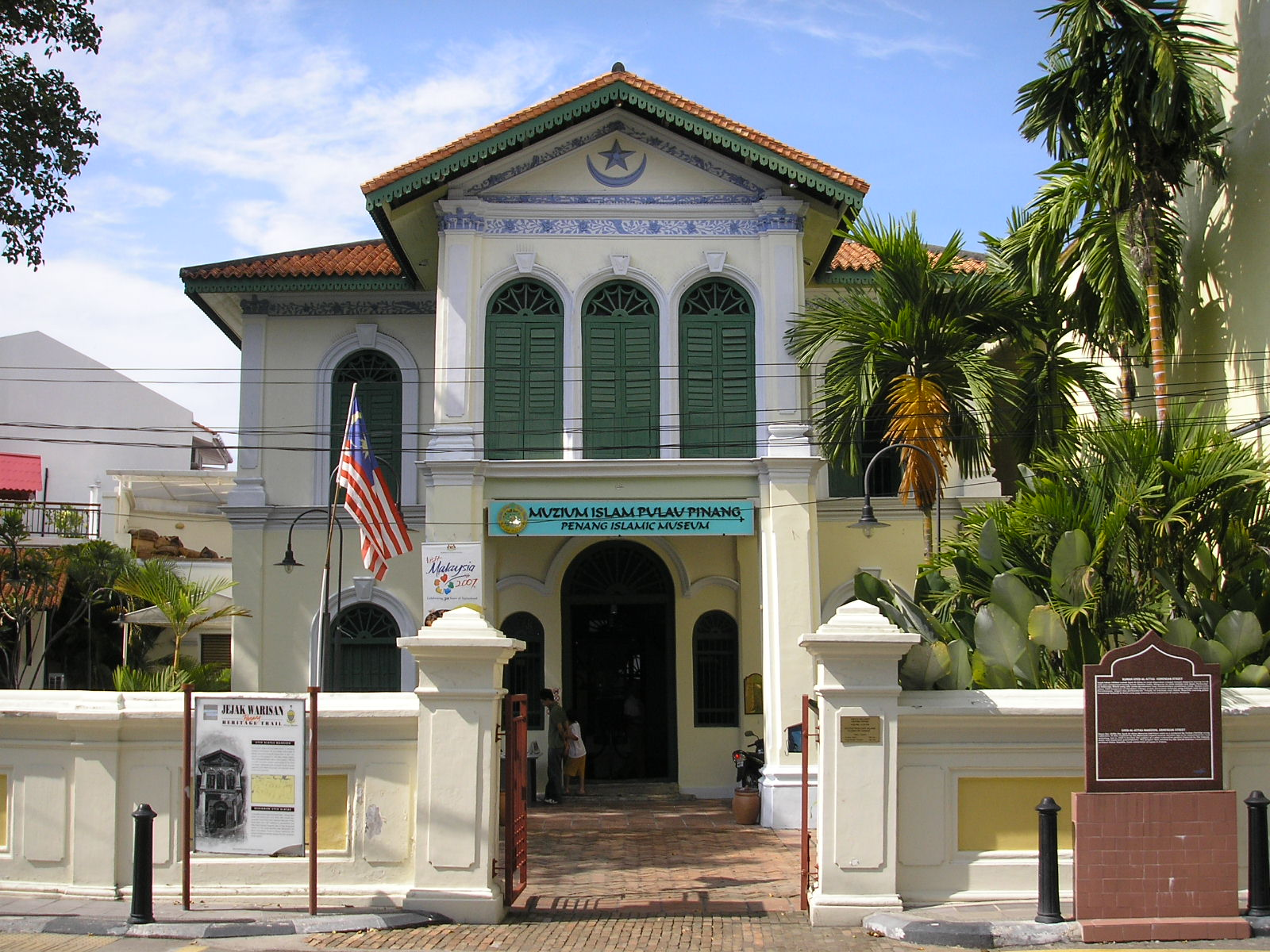
Penang Islamic Museum

Originally, Armenian Street was called Malay Lane, after a Malay settlement that used to exist around the area. The Malay influences can still be seen to this day, particularly along the westernmost section of Armenian Street, where the Penang Islamic Museum is located.

By 1808, the street was renamed as Armenian Street due to the influx of Armenian traders who resided along the road. The Armenians went on to establish St. Gregory's Church within George Town in 1822, while the Sarkies Brothers founded the Eastern & Oriental Hotel in the 1880s. The Armenian presence was short-lived, however, as most of the Armenians had already left by the time the church was demolished in 1937.

The Chinese gradually took over most of Armenian Street around the mid 19th century and built clan houses, such as the Khoo Kongsi, within the vicinity of the road. Concurrently, Armenian Street became notorious for Chinese triad activities, with the Hokkien-dominated Khian Teik Society establishing itself along the road. As a result, Armenian Street witnessed heavy fighting during the 1867 Penang Riots, where the British authorities, reinforced with sepoys, built blockades and used force to quell the turf war between rival Chinese and Malay secret societies.

In 1910, Sun Yat-sen chaired the Penang conference within a townhouse at Armenian Street, during which he managed to raise $8,000 for revolutionary activities in China against the ruling Qing dynasty. The townhouse has since been converted into the Sun Yat-sen Museum, which became one of the filming locations for the Chinese movie, Road to Dawn.

== Landmarks ==
- 'Children on a Bicycle' wall mural by Ernest Zacharevic
- Sun Yat-sen Museum
- Penang Islamic Museum

== See also ==
- List of roads in George Town
- Architecture of Penang
