= Zhuang Xiyan =

20th-century Chinese businessman

- 庄西言
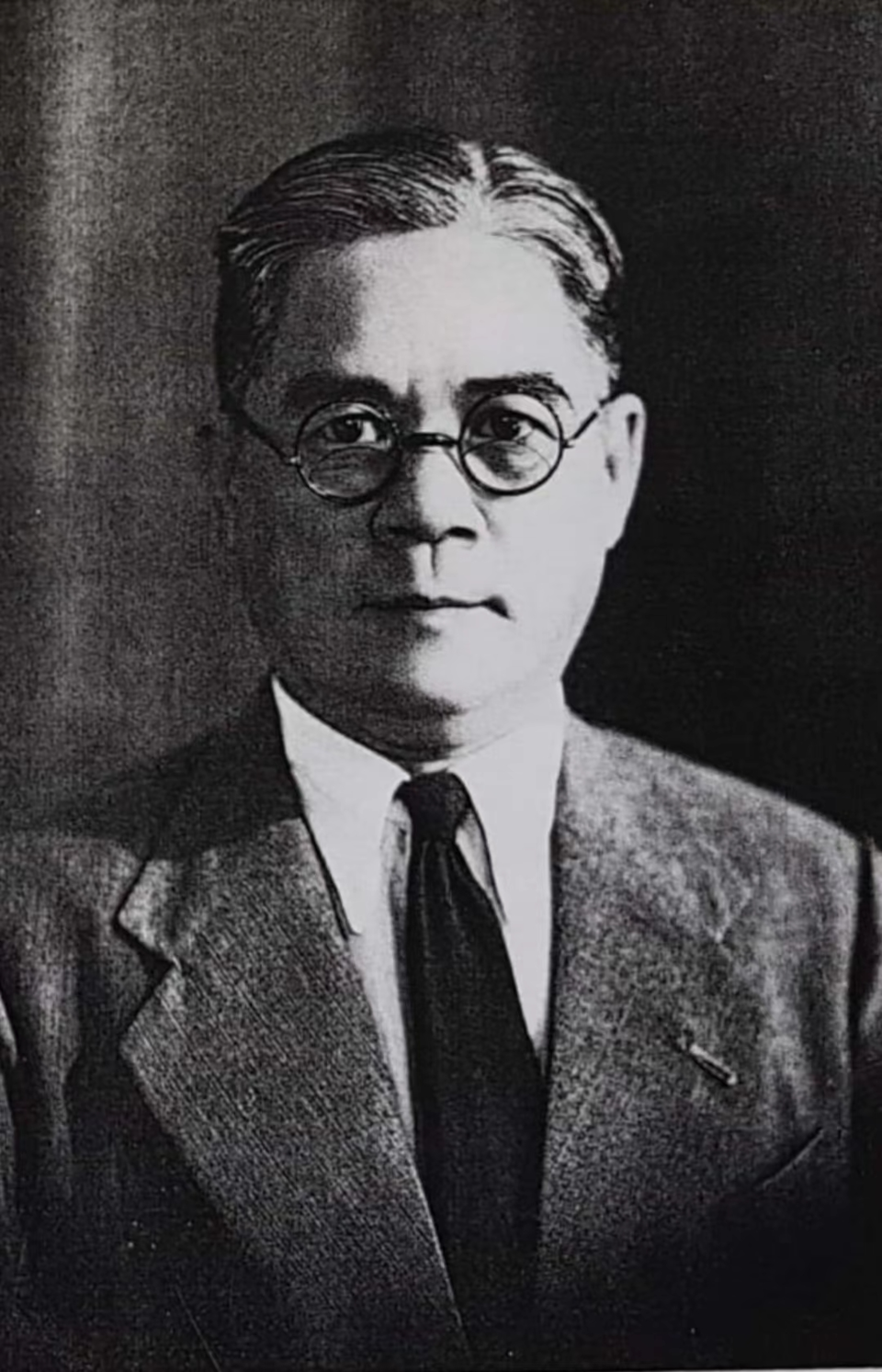
- Zhuang in 1915
- Born: 1885
- Died: 1965 (aged 79–80)
- Burial place: Hong Kong
- Organization(s): Central Committee for Overseas Chinese Affairs, Nanyang Overseas Chinese Fundraising and Relief Association
- Title: Vice Chairman of the Nanyang Overseas Chinese Fundraising and Relief Association
- Movement: Anti-Japanese resistance (World War II)

Zhuang Xiyan (simplified Chinese: 庄西言; traditional Chinese: 莊西言; pinyin: Zhuāng Xīyán; Hokkien: Chng Se-giân; 1885–1965) was a Chinese overseas businessman and community leader in Southeast Asia. He was best known for his role in organizing and financing support for the Republic of China during the Second Sino-Japanese War.

== Biography ==
Zhuang was born in 1885 in Nanjing and moved to Indonesia in 1905. He became a member of Tongmenghui. He became the president of the Jakarta-based Siang Hwee in 1913. Zhuang founded the Tjoan Bie Textile Company in 1917. He began his second stint at Siang Hwee's president between 1928 and 1932 and subsequently served as Jakarta-based THHK's vice president between 1935 and 1937. Before the Second World War, he was named to the Chinese Parliament as a representative of the Overseas Chinese.

He was one of the Vice-Chairmen of the Nanyang Overseas Chinese Fundraising and Relief Association which was an organization formed mainly to help anti-Japanese resistance in the East Asian theater of WWII. Japanese officials held him in detention between 1943 and 1945. Zhuang resume his involvement in Shang Lian, the Chinese Chambers of Commerce in Indonesia, in the 1950s. He was the vice chairman of Kao Shang School Board, which was backed by Shang Lian.

Zhuang died in 1965 in Hong Kong.
