= Road to Dawn =

2007 Chinese historical film

- Directed by: Derek Chiu
- Written by: Meazi
- Produced by: Wang Jiancheng; Zhao Jianguo; Xu Jianping; Wang Maoliang; Song Lequn; Liao Shuhui; Goh Mai Loon (Malaysia)
- Starring: Winston Chao; Angelica Lee
- Cinematography: Chen Chi-ying
- Edited by: Meazi
- Music by: Pan Guoxing; Su Junjie
- Release date: June 28, 2007
- Running time: 125 minutes
- Countries: China; Hong Kong; Malaysia
- Language: Chinese
- Budget: US$2 million

Road to Dawn
- Chinese: 夜。明
Transcriptions
Standard Mandarin
- Hanyu Pinyin: Yè míng

Road to Dawn (Chinese: 夜。明; pinyin: Yè míng; lit. 'night', 'dawn') is a 2007 Chinese historical film directed by Hong Kong filmmaker Derek Chiu. The film depicts an obscure episode in Sun Yat-sen's revolutionary life, when he sought refuge in Penang from July to December 1910. He relocated the Southeast Asian headquarters of his political party, the Tongmenghui, to Penang and convened the Penang Conference to stage the Second Guangzhou Uprising.

The film is also called Before The Sunrise.

== Cast ==
The movie brings together cast and crew from China, Taiwan, Hong Kong and Malaysia.

- Winston Chao as Sun Yat-sen
- Angelica Lee as Xu Dan Rong
- Wu Yue as Chen Cuifen
- Zhao Zheng as Luo Zhaoling
- Vickey Liu as Madam Xu
- Wang Jiancheng as Xu Boheng
- Duan Qiuxu as Goh Say Eng
- Fong Chok Gin as Elder Chang
- Paul Woods as Mr. Grant
- Lachlan J. Modrzynski as Master Grant
- Himanshu Bhatt as Housekeeper
- You Yong

== Plot ==
The movie revolves around two couples. The historical couple Dr. Sun and Chen Cuifen who express mature love is contrasted with fictional couple Luo Zhaoling and Xu Dan Rong and their youthful romance.

Sun Yat-sen is in exile again after his ninth uprising in China fails in 1910. The Qing government in China has put a price of 700,000 taels of silver on his head. Forced to leave Japan, he goes to British colonial port of Penang to continue his fundraising. He seeks support from opium cartel boss Xu Boheng. Xu's daughter Xu Dan Rong, is engaged to schoolteacher Luo Zhaoling. A covert Qing agent, Luo has been ordered to assassinate Sun, but his rebellious fiancée Xu Dan Rong becomes attracted to Sun's cause. Meanwhile, Sun's long-time companion Chen Cuifen joins him in Penang. Sun learns that his mother has died in China, but cannot pay for her funeral. Sun's friends and followers come to his assistance. Mr. Grant, a British colonial officer pressures Xu to smuggle opium to China and arrange a marriage between Xu Dan Rong and his son Master Grant. Sun intervenes to save Xu and his daughter, and out of gratitude Xu arranges for Sun to speak to prominent members of Penang community. Sun now convenes a secret meeting among the Southeast Asian Tongmenghui members to plan the Second Guangzhou Uprising.

== Releases ==
The film premiere at the Great Hall of the People in Beijing on 27 June 2007 was attended by both Chinese and Malaysian government leaders and media. The film was classified an ‘Important Historical Topic Movie’ by the PRC's State Administration of Radio, Film, and Television (SARFT) -- the first such filmed 100% outside of China and based on a historical event that took place outside of China. A charity premier was held in Penang on 17 September 2007 in aid of the new Wawasan Open University (WOU) Chancellor's scholarship fund.

“Road To Dawn” in Japanese title 「孫文-100年先を見た男-」has recently gained attention in Japan, where starting from 5 September 2008 it screened for about seven months. In Tokyo alone, it screened for almost two months.

In 2016, the Sun Yat Sen Museum Penang has relaunched the DVD for the Malaysian market.

== Awards and nominations ==
10th China Movie Channel Media Awards

- Most Popular Actor Awards Winston Chao
- Most Promising Newcomer Awards (Wu Yue)

12th Huabiao Awards

- Most Outstanding Newcomer for Scriptwriting (Maezi)

2007 Chinese American Film Festival

- Golden Angel Award

2007 Guangzhou University Students Film Festival

- Best Actor Award Winston Chao

2009 China Centre Publicity Board Awards for "5 in 1 Project Outstanding Civilized Movie" category “"五个一工程“精神文明奖优秀电影” Excellent Quality Movie

The film was nominated for Huabiao Awards Most Outstanding Movie and Best Actress (Wu Yue), China Golden Rooster Best Music (Pan Guoxing, Su Junjie), Golden Horse Best Image Design (Doris Song). The movie was screened at the 2007 Hawaii International Film Festival, 2008 Kuala Lumpur International Film Festival, 2008 Cannes Film Festival. It is also the closing ceremony movie for Singapore International Film Festival.

== Production ==
Road to Dawn was billed as a Shenzhen Media Group, Shenzhen Film Studio, Pearl River Film Company presentation of a Shenzhen Assn. for Intl. Cultural Exchanges, Shenzhen Media Group production.

Road To Dawn main investor company is Malaysian's Ribuan Hijau Sdn. Bhd., which owned 4 Malaysian Chinese press companies.

Road To Dawn was the first China-produced movie filmed entirely in Malaysia. It was filmed entirely on location at the Sun Yat-sen Museum Penang in August and September 2006. Other international movies have used Penang a substitute location -- Indochine (1992), Paradise Road (1997), Anna and The King (1999), The Touch (2002), and Lust, Caution (2007). However, Road To Dawn is the first international movie set in Penang.

Road To Dawn fully exploits the multicultural setting of Penang, showing cultural diversity in ethnic communities, costumes, houses of worship and architectural heritage. Angelica Lee plays a young woman from the Straits Chinese (also called Baba Nyonya or peranakan) minority community.

In Road To Dawn, Winston Chao plays Sun Yat Sen for the second time - which revolves around a young Sun Yat Sen in Penang. The first was in the 1997 movie, The Soong Sisters in which he played the older Sun Yat Sen from the time of the Xinhai Revolution up to his death.

== History and dramatic license ==
Sun Yat Sen lived in Penang between July and December 1910. He was joined by his first wife, his second wife, his two daughters and his brother Sun Mei. For the sake of a romantic storyline, the movie only shows Sun and his second wife Chen Cuifen.

The fictional character of Xu Dang Rong is loosely based on the real life character of Chen Bijun, a young woman revolutionary who became the wife of Wang Jingwei, a close associate of Sun Yat Sen.

The fictional character of Luo Zhaoling is loosely based on Luo Zhonghuo, a Penang-trained teacher and poet (though he was never a Qing agent), who became one of the 72 martyrs of the Second Guangzhou Uprising.

The movie features a reenactment of the secret meeting, known as the 1910 Penang Conference. The second part of the conference, held on November 14, 1910 at 120 Armenian Street, was shot on location in the historic house which is now the Sun Yat Sen Museum Penang.
