= Gelaohui =

Chinese secret society

Elder Brothers Society
- Formation: Qianlong period (one theory)
- Founded at: Sichuan
- Dissolved: after 1949
- Type: Secret society

Chinese name
- Traditional Chinese: 哥老會
- Simplified Chinese: 哥老会
Transcriptions
Standard Mandarin
- Hanyu Pinyin: Gēlǎohuì
- Wade–Giles: Ko^{1}-lao^{3}-hui^{4}

The Gelaohui, usually translated as the Elder Brothers Society, was a secret society and underground resistance movement against the Qing dynasty. Although it was not associated with Sun Yat-sen's Tongmenghui, they both participated in the Xinhai Revolution. It was also known as Futaubang, or Hatchet Gang, as every member allegedly carried a small hatchet inside the sleeve.

Li Hanzhang (李瀚章), the governor of Hunan in the Qing dynasty, stated in the memorial that the Gelaohui "originated in Sichuan and Guizhou for a long time", the society engaged in several uprisings across China, notably in Hunan province during 1870 and 1871. Numerous individuals notable in late-19th and early-20th Chinese history (including Zhu De, Wu Yuzhang, Liu Zhidan and He Long) were Gelaohui members.

Strongly xenophobic and anti-Manchu Qing, the Gelaohui were active in the Xinhai Revolution of 1911, as well as taking part in attacks on Catholic missions and converts in 1912.

Originally quite willing to take on other "oppressed" Chinese minorities, several Chinese Muslim Gelaohui members participated in the Ningxia Revolution, and there was a substantial number of Muslim Gelaohui in Shaanxi.

During the Xinhai Revolution of Xinjiang, there were fights related to the Elder Brothers Society.

== Origins ==
The question of the origins of the Gelaohui is a mystery that has long plagued historical researchers. The exact date of its establishment is still unknown.

=== Same origin with Tiandihui ===
It is believed that the Gelaohui had the same origin with the Tiandihui, that railed against the Manchu Qing dynasty, founded by Zheng Chenggong during the Kangxi period of the Qing dynasty to "oppose the Qing dynasty and restore the Ming dynasty" (反清復明). This has long been the most popular theory in Chinese historiography. This theory originated from the revolutionaries represented by Tao Chengzhang and others during the 1911 Revolution.

=== Qianlong period ===
It's believed that the Gelaohui can be traced back to the reign of Qianlong period, while its actual formation took place during the Jiaqing period and Daoguang period. Sichuan's Yansi (咽嗜) and Qianhui (钱会) can be regarded as the predecessors of the Gelaohui. The development of the organization from Sichuan to Huguang was basically realized simultaneously with the influx of Sichuan salt.

The Japanese Shū Hirayama (平山周) clearly affirmed that the Gelaohui was established during the Qianlong period. As a friend of Sun Yat-sen and a sympathizer of the 1911 Revolution, he visited the society many times to investigate the inner workings and wrote the book The Chinese Revolutionary Party and the secret societies, which was published in 1911.

=== Same as the Guoluhui ===
It's believed that the Gelaohui is the same as the Guoluhui (啯噜会), because "Gelao" is a phonetic transcription of the word "Guolu".

=== Outgrowth of the integration and development of Tiandihui and Bailianjiao ===
Some scholars in Japan and the United States believe that the Gelaohui was the outgrowth of the integration and development of Tiandihui and Bailianjiao in the late Qing dynasty, but the Gelaohui did not have the same origin with the Tiandihui.

=== Developed from the Jianghuhui ===
It is believed that the Gelaohui was developed from the Jianghuhui (江湖会), which in turn came from the Renyihui (仁义会) and the Tiandihui.

=== Xiang Army ===
One view is that it is more likely it began as an offshoot or alternative name of the so-called "Brotherhood Clique" within the Xiang Army. It is believed that some 30% of the Xiang Army may have been Gelaohui members, and after the disbandment of the army in the aftermath of the Taiping Rebellion it spread along the Yangtze to become a Triad order. The Geolaohui became increasingly associated with the revolutionaries of Dr. Sun Yat-sen's Tongmenghui during the early 1900s, participating in the Xinhai Revolution against the Qing, and infiltrating the army and education system.

=== Originating from the Guoluhui in Sichuan ===
It is believed that the Gelaohui originated from the Guoluhui in Sichuan in the early Qianlong period. In the Jiaqing period and Daoguang period, due to the northward movement of the Tiandihui forces, it merged with the forces of Bailianjiao and Guolu Party (啯噜党) in Chuan Chu (川楚) area. And they infiltrated and integrated with each other to form the name of the Gaolaohui. During the reign of the Tongzhi period and Guangxu period, with the demobilization of the Xiang Army and the rapid increase in the number of bankrupt laborers and unemployed vagrants, the Gelaohui flourished. It was not a mere reproduction or a variation of the name of the organizations of Guolu. Taking the Guolu as its embryo, the Gelaohui absorbed and merged some of the characteristics of the Tiandihui and the Bailianjiao, and was a rapid development of a vagrant organization in China under specific social conditions.

== Anti-colonial movement ==
Three primary demographic factors combined in the 1860s to create the Gelaohui as a major sociopolitical force: (1) members from the Guolu, which had been a marginalized group in the 1840s, (2) members from the Hunan forces fighting the Taiping rebellion, and (3) members from the 1859-1865 major peasant uprising against the Qing empire led by Li Longhe and Lan Dashun.

In the 1870s and 1880s, the Gelaohui began gradually accepting wealthy merchants and gentry into its membership. The 1880s and 1890s, new Gelaohui lodges tended to be led by men who were already respected community figures.

Beginning as an anti-Manchu organization, by 1891 the Gelaohui had grown to encompass a wide variety of revolutionary aims. They were blamed for anti-foreign riots around the Yangtze delta, apparently in hope of provoking foreigners and damaging the Chinese government's international standing, and accused of infiltrating schools to foster anti-Western sentiment. After the German government took over Shandong many Chinese feared that the foreign missionaries and quite possibly all Christian activities were colonial attempts at "carving the melon", i.e., to divide and colonize China piece by piece. A Chinese official expressed the animosity towards foreigners succinctly, "Take away your missionaries and your opium and you will be welcome."

During and after the Xinhai Revolution of 1911, the Gelaohui participated in the massacre of Manchus in the Xi'an banner garrison in the northeast of the city and attacked the Manchu banner garrison in Ningxia. The Hui Muslims of Xi'an in Shaanxi sided with the Gelaohui in massacring and raping Manchus while the Hui Muslims of Gansu under general Ma Anliang and Ma Qi supported the status quo so Ma Anliang led an army of Hui to fight against the Hui and Han rebels in Shaanxi and Ma Qi helped relive the Ningxia garrison, but Ma Anliang and Ma Qi stood down and when Yuan Shikai forced the Qing dynasty to abdicate and swore allegiance to Yuan Shikai's government, supporting the new Republic of China. Ma Anliang, Changgeng and Shengyun failed to capture Shaanxi from the revolutionaries. In Ningxia, Qing forces were attacked by both Hui Muslim Gelaohui and Han Gelaohui members, while Hui general Ma Qi and Ma Yuanzhang were in the Qing forces fighting against them but Ma Yuanzhang defected to the republicans after Ma Anliang gave up on the Qing. Some Gansu Hui led by Ma Fuxiang joined the republicans. Gansu Hui general Ma Fuxiang did not participate with Ma Anliang in the battles with Shaanxi revolutionaries and refused to join the Qing Manchu Shengyun and Changgeng in their attempts to defend the Qing before the Qing abdication, instead the independence of Gansu from Qing control was jointly declared by non-Muslim gentry with Hui Muslim Ma Fuxiang. The Gelaohui called for Hui and Han of Xi'an to unite and kill Manchus.

Among the "tenets" of the Gelaohui was "hatred of the foreigner", from which "hatred of the Manchu" was derived, and it encouraged the killing of foreigners.

The Gelaohui hated foreigners and Christians. During the Xinhai Revolution in 1912, they attacked Catholic missions in Sandaohe, Ningxia, but the Chinese Muslim forces under Muslim General Ma Fuxiang protected the missions.

The Gelaohui and the Muslim warlord Ma Fuxiang came to an agreement in 1922, in which Ma Fuxiang agreed to allow the Gelaohui to extort protection money from wool merchants in Baotou.

The Muslim General Ma Lu (马禄) was a member of the Gelaohui. He fought against the Japanese in World War II along with Muslim General Ma Biao.

The Muslim General Ma Yuanlin (马元林) was a member of the Gelaohui.

The Hunan Army was extensively infiltrated by the anti Qing Gelaohui secret society, who started several mutinies during the Dungan Revolt (1862–1877), delaying crucial offensives. Zuo Zongtang put down the mutinies and executed those involved. Hubei Gelaohui soldiers mutinied in Suide in Zuo Zongtang's army in 1867. The Han Gelaohui had infiltrated the Qing military in Xinjiang during the Dungan revolt (1895–1896) and allegedly planned to help the Hui rebels before the Hui rebels were crushed.

Despite being staunchly against the production and sale of opium by foreign powers during the later Qing dynasty, members of the Gelaohui became involved in domestic opium harvesting. A successor to Gelaohui in Sichuan, named the Gown Brotherhood (袍哥会) permeated all forms of local government in Songpan County until the Second Sino-Japanese War. Despite campaigns stemming from Chengdu to decrease opium production and consumption, mountainous regions in rural Sichuan which relied on trade used opium production to offset increased land taxation from the Nationalist government, of which Gown Brothers acted as security and distribution networks. Xi'an Hui Muslims managed tea shops in Songpan County, Sichuan. The Gelaohui in Sichuan attacked western Christian missionaries and promoted the growing and trafficking of opium against the Qing government which tried to crack down on opium. The Gelaohui was present in the Sichuan Hubei border and the Fuguhui group which promoted traditional Han hairstyle and clothes against modern western influence was present there as well.

Many Hui smoked opium in Yunnan in addition to dealing in it, despite denials by some Hui that they did not smoke it since it was against Islam. Opium is still produced in ethnic minority regions of Yunnan and other regions.

A year before the massacre of Manchus in October 1911, an oath against Manchus was sworn at the Great Goose Pagoda in Xi'an by the Gelaohui in 1911. Manchu banner garrisons were slaughtered in Nanjing, Zhenjiang, Taiyuan, Xi'an and Wuchang The Manchu quarter was located in the north eastern part of Xi'an and walled off while the Hui Muslim quarter was located in the northwestern part of Xi'an but did not have walls separating it from the Han parts. Southern Xi'an was entirely Han. Xi'an had the biggest Manchu banner garrison quarter by area before its destruction.

The revolutionaries were led by students of the military academy who overcame the guards at the gates of Xi'an and shut them, secured the arsenal and slaughtering all Manchus at their temple and then storming and slaughtering the Manchus in the Manchu banner quarter of the city. The Manchu quarter was set on fire and many Manchus were burned alive. Manchu men, women and girls were slaughtered for three days and then after that, only Manchu women and girls were spared while Manchu men and boys continued to be slaughtered. Many Manchus committed suicide by overdosing on opium and throwing themselves into wells. The revolutionaries were helped by the fact that Manchus stored gunpowder in their houses so they exploded when set on fire, killing the Manchus inside. 10,000 to 20,000 Manchus were slaughtered. The revolutionaries wore white badges to distinguish themselves when distributing guns at the captured arsenal. The Han Chinese revolutionaries suffered very few injuries or casualties while the Manchus were slaughtered since the Manchus were armed with inferior weapons while the revolutionaries had modern rifles from the arsenal. There were 5,000 Manchu adult men of fighting ability and they could do little as they were slaughtered. The revolutionaries killed all Manchu men, women and children until Wednesday and after they continued killing all Manchu men while sparing only Manchu females.

The Gelaohui revolutionaries were known for being anti-foreign and anti-Manchu and Protestant missionaries said they distributed tracts against foreign missionaries and attacked some Protestant missions during the 1911 revolution with some missionaries getting killed but were reigned in by their superiors and told to only attack Manchus. The Gelaohui then attacked the 20,000 Manchus in the Manchu quarter of the city and slaughtered the majority of them (15,000), expelling the rest. The Manchu governor Sheng Yun flew into a rage as he escaped to Gansu and ordered Gansu Hui Muslim general Ma Anliang to lead Muslim Hui soldiers from Gansu to destroy and sack Xi'an in retaliation for the massacre of the Manchu quarter, but a messenger carried the message to Sheng Yun that the Qing court capitulated in Beijing with Yuan Shikai's agreement and Sheng Yun fell into a rage and reviled Yuan Shikai. Someone shot a letter attached to an arrows into Ma Anliang's camp notifying him of the Qing abdication, so Ma Anliang stopped the attack before it reached Xi'an and withdrew his soldiers to Xi'an was not sacked.

The Qing Manchu Gansu and Shaanxi Governor-general and Qing dynasty gave the title of Xian and Gansu chief general to Ma Anliang when it begged him to destroy the Shaanxi republicans from his Gansu base. The Shaanxi revolutionary commander was Zhang Yunshan. The two sides clashed in January 1912 at Qianzhou (Qian County) but neither side was winning the battle. A Hui Muslim revolutionary was appointed as governor of Shaanxi, Ma Yugui and he urged Ma Anliang to give up and not fight for the Qing by telling him and his soldiers "A Hui does not kill a Hui", appealing to religion. When the Qing Gansu Hui soldiers wearing their Hui white caps asked their Shaanxi opponents to defect, the Shaanxi Hui revolutionary governor Ma Yugui told them that further fighting between them would cause both of them to suffer and both Han and Hui and Allah would be saddened so they should give up and abandon the Qing. Ma Anliang was also approached and asked to defect from the Qing by the Hui Beijing Imam Wang Kuan who was summonsed by the revolutionaries. He told him "not to fall into the trap of some wicked man" (the Manchu governor general) and "not to elect one name and neglect the needs of millions" (referring to the Qing royal family as one name). Yuan Shikai, who became president after the Republic of China accepted the Qing court's abdication, sent the Shaanxi revolutionaries Henan reinforcements to press Ma Anliang into giving up. Ma Anliang in Gansu finally received news of the Qing abdication in Beijing and decided to stop the frozen battle neither side was winning, and joined the revolutionaries, ending the Qing cause in Gansu. Ma Anliang and Zhang Yunshan then met in March.

After October 1911, the Shaanxi revolutionaries were in a series of stalemates against the Gansu Qing loyalist army made out of Muslims under Ma Anliang and Manchu governor general Shengyun's command. Both sides suffered heavy casualties but Lichuan (Li-chuan) and Qianzhou (Chien-chou) fell to the Gansu army. The Qing emperor abdicated when Xianyang (Shien-yang) was about to be attacked by the Gansu army. The Manchu governor general Shengyun tried who wanted to keep fighting after the Qing abdication tried to hide the abdication, but Ma Anliang received news of it sent to him by Zhang Fengyi (Chang Feng-yi) via telegram. Shengyun was sarcastically asked by Ma Anliang, "Now that the emperor has abdicated, for whom shall we fight? Do you intend to succeed the emperor?"

Ma Anliang fought in 1895 to relieve Xining with four ying of troops and served in the Gansu army under Dong Fuxiang. The Qing governor generals Changgeng (Chang-keng) and Shengyun had close relations with the Gansu army officers under Dong Fuxiang. The Qing ordered the Gansu-based Ma Anliang to fight against the revolutionaries in Shaanxi and the revolutionaries attacked Ningxia in Gansu and Ma Anliang recovered it, but that was the last victory for the loyalist side as the Qing abdicated and Shaanxi was not taken by the Gansu forces.

Ma Anliang was ordered to attack the revolutionaries in Shaanxi by the baoyi bondservant Chang Geng and Manchu Shengyun.

Eastern soldiers of the new republic were mobilized by Yuan Shikai when the attack against Shaanxi began by Ma Anliang, but news of the abdication of the Qing emperor reached Ma Anliang before he attacked Xi'an, so Ma Anliang ended all military operations and changed his allegiance to the Republic of China. All pro-Qing military activity in the northwest was put to an end by this.

Yuan Shikai managed to induce Ma Anliang to not attack Shaanxi after the Gelaohui took over the province and accept the Republic of China under his presidency in 1912. During the National Protection War in 1916 between the Republicans and Yuan Shikai's monarchy, Ma Anliang readied his soldiers and informed the Republicans that he and the Muslims would stick to Yuan Shikai until the end. Yuan Shikai ordered Ma Anliang to block Bai Lang (White Wolf) from going into Sichuan and Gansu by blocking Hanzhong and Fengxiangfu.

The Protestant Shensi mission operated a hospital in Xian. Some American missionaries were reported killed in Xi'an. A report claimed Manchus massacred missionaries in the suburbs of Xi'an. Missionaries were reported killed in Xi'an and Taiyuan. Shaanxi joined the revolution on October 24. Sheng Yun was governor of Shaanxi in 1905.

== 1930s: years of decline ==
The Gelaohui continued to exist as a broad and loosely affiliated group of hundreds of thousands well into the 1930s, though its influence was severely curtailed by the end of the Warlord Era, Chiang Kai-shek's rise to power, and the ravagement of the country during the Second Sino-Japanese War and the Chinese Civil War. Nevertheless, the society's influence remained substantial until the Communists seized power in 1949; in 1936, for example, Mao Zedong wrote an open letter to the Gelaohui declaring them legal under the Chinese Soviet government and asking for their assistance. Starting in 1949, however, the society was repressed and is believed to be defunct.

== Organization ==
The Gelaohui was known for rewarding loyalty and dedication with advancement through its ranks which, according to academic Mark W. Driscoll, was the opposite of most members' prior socioeconomic experience: "relentless movement down and out." The novel Water Margin apparently influenced its ritual and nomenclature.

Guan Di was the tutelary divinity of the Gelaohui.

A text called The Ocean Depths was the manual for starting a new Gelaohui lodge.

=== Ranks ===
The top leader in a Gelaohui lodge was called the ship's captain or dragon head. This figure was to model himself after Liu Bei.

The first rank of a lodge was composed of (typically four) men called the first uncles. They shared power with the lodge's top leader.

The third rank was "manager" or "keeper of the lodge" and its role model was Zhang Fei.

The fourth rank was vacant for cultural reasons.

The fifth rank was the fifth uncle, whose role model was Shan Xiongxin.

The six rank was "the carrier of the black flag" which gathered intelligence and evaluated the backgrounds of new members.

The seventh rank was vacant for cultural reasons.

The eighth rank was "the holder of the spirit flag," awarded to "the champion of the common people and the destroyer of tyrants."

The ninth rank was the "ninth river," which acclimated new members to the group.

The tenth rank was the "final tenth" or "tail of the phoenix," which provided instruction on security responsibilities as was to be available at all times in case of emergency.

== See also ==
- Tongmenghui
- Revive China Society
- Kuomintang
- History of the Republic of China
- Huaxinghui
