= Sun Yat-sen Museum Penang =

Museum in Northeast, Penang, Malaysia

- Muzium Sun Yat-sen Pulau Pinang 孫中山槟城基地博物館
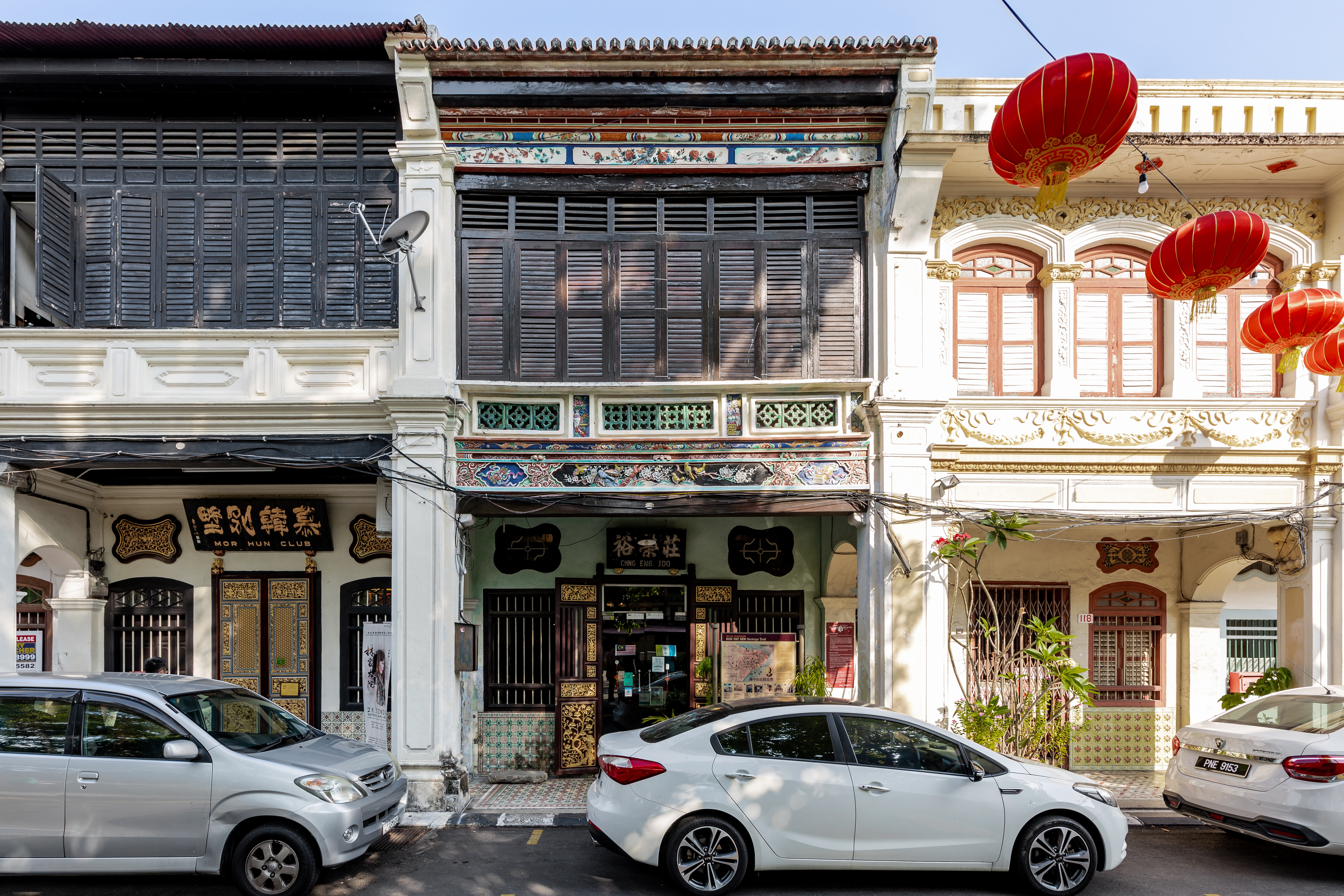

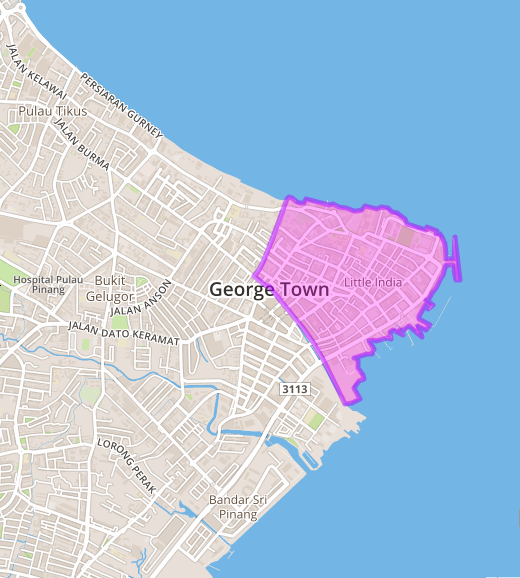
- Location within George Town's UNESCO World Heritage Site (purple)
- Established: 2001
- Location: George Town, Penang, Malaysia
- Coordinates: 5.415761°N 100.336242°E
- Type: museum

UNESCO World Heritage Site
- Type: Cultural
- Criteria: ii, iii, iv
- Designated: 2008 (32nd session)
- Part of: George Town UNESCO Core Zone
- Reference no.: 1223
- Region: Asia-Pacific

The Sun Yat-sen Museum Penang (Malay: Muzium Sun Yat-sen Pulau Pinang; Chinese: 孫中山槟城基地博物館) formerly called the Sun Yat-sen Penang Base, is a museum in George Town, Penang, Malaysia. The museum is dedicated to Sun Yat-sen, a Chinese nationalist who established the Republic of China after his efforts in the Xinhai Revolution.

== History ==
The Sun Yat-sen Museum Penang is in a historic house. Sun Yat-sen devised many of his plans to overthrow the Qing Dynasty in the museum building. In 1910, acting on the immense support among overseas Chinese for the ousting of the Qing dynasty, Sun moved the southeast Asian headquarters of the Tongmenghui party to Penang.

When Sun first brought his family to Penang in 1910, the building housed the Penang Philomatic Union reading club. The club was a cover for Sun's political party. On 14 November 1910, Sun Yat-sen chaired an emergency meeting of the Nanyang Tongmenghui in this house and launched the fundraising campaign for the Second Guangzhou Uprising. It was in this building that Sun Yat-sen delivered his famous speech at the 1910 Penang Conference, and raised Straits Dollars $8000 on the spot. In December 1910, the first issue of the Kwong Wah Yit Poh was published from 120 Armenian Street. Launched by Dr. Sun and his followers in Penang, it is now the world's oldest Chinese newspaper outside of China.

Constructed around 1880 as a residential townhouse, the building measures over 130 feet (40 metres) in length and exemplifies Penang's Straits Settlements architectural style. The structure retains original architectural elements, including a central courtyard, a timber staircase, patterned floor tiles, structural timber beams, and a kitchen equipped with a traditional firewood stove and utensils. The interior also features Straits Chinese blackwood furniture and carved wooden screens.

In 1926 ownership of the house passed to a Hokkien merchant, Ch'ng Teong Swee. Today, the house is owned by his granddaughter Khoo Salma Nasution, a writer and heritage advocate. The "Dr. Sun Yat Sen in Penang" historical gallery was launched by Prime Minister of Malaysia Mahathir Mohamad on 4 February 2001. The former General Secretary of the Chinese Communist Party (then vice-president and Secretariat member) Mr. Hu Jintao visited the Sun Yat Sen Museum Penang on 25 April 2002.

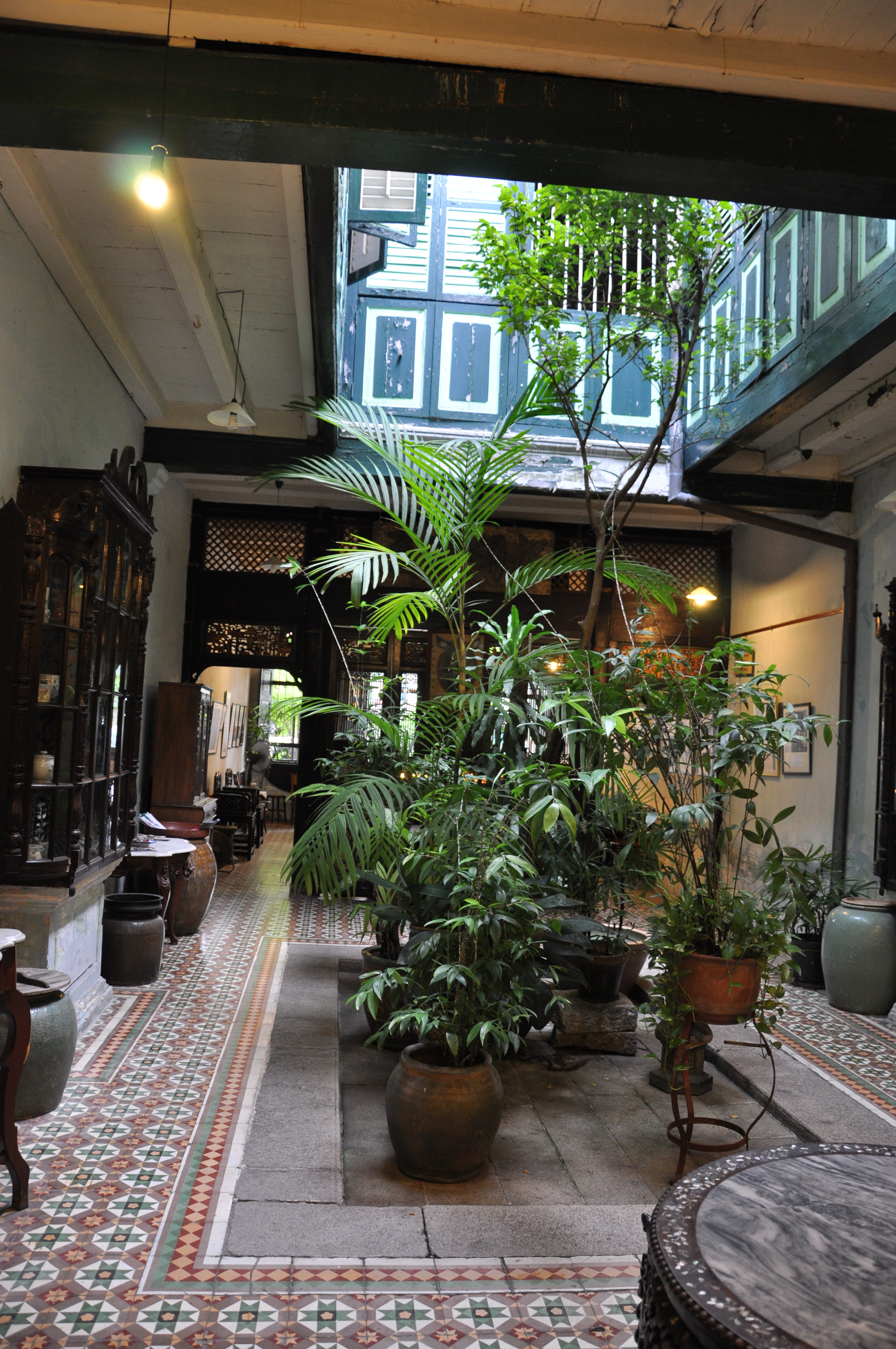
Courtyard at the museum

In 2007, the international Chinese movie Road To Dawn, based on Dr. Sun Yat Sen's revolutionary activities in Penang, filmed the reenactment of the Emergency Meeting of the 1910 Penang Conference in this museum. The house was extensively renovated in 2010–11, with special changes to its façade and roof. The craftsman for the renovation project came from Quanzhou, southern China. In 2010, the Sun Yat Sen Museum Penang hosted the 22nd Joint Conference of the Sun Yat Sen and Soong Ching Ling Memorials, a major event which was participated by 30 museums ad memorials and saw the reunion of 29 members of the Sun clan (descendants of Sun Yat-sen and Sun Mei). This event was an international centennial commemoration of the 1910 Penang Conference. In 2011, the Sun Yat Sen Museum Penang started an International Youth Exchange Programme with the China Soong Ching Ling Foundation.

== Sun Yat Sen Heritage Trail ==
The Sun Yat Sen Heritage Trail starts from the Sun Yat Sen Museum and links more than a dozen heritage sites associated with Sun Yat Sen and his supporters. The trail was developed by Penang Heritage Trust in 2010 and was launched at 120 Armenian Street by Wang Gungwu, a prominent historian of China and Southeast Asia. The trail is also Southeast Asia's first of its kind.

== See also ==
- Chinese revolutionary activities in Malaya
- Sun Yat-sen
- 1910 Penang Conference
- Xinhai Revolution
- List of museums in Malaysia
- Road To Dawn movie (2007)
