= Song Jiaoren =

Chinese republican revolutionary (1882–1913)

- 宋敎仁
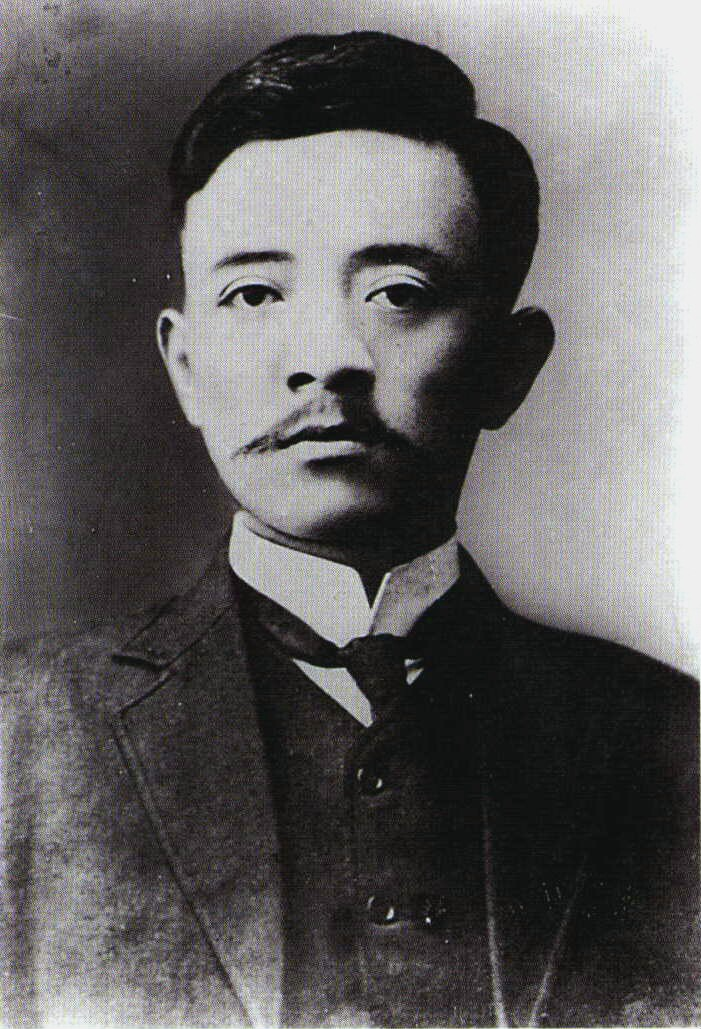

Acting President of Kuomintang
- In office 25 August 1912 – 22 March 1913
- Preceded by: Position established
- Succeeded by: Sun Yat-sen

Vice President of Huaxinghui
- In office 15 February 1904 – 30 July 1905
- Preceded by: Position established
- Succeeded by: Position abolished

Personal details
- Born: 5 April 1882 Taoyuan, Hunan, Qing dynasty
- Died: 22 March 1913 (aged 30) Shanghai, Jiangsu, Republic of China
- Cause of death: Assassination
- Party: Kuomintang (1912–1913)
- Other political affiliations: Huaxinghui (1904–1905); Tongmenghui (1905–1912)

Song Jiaoren
- Chinese: 宋敎仁
Transcriptions
Standard Mandarin
- Hanyu Pinyin: Sòng Jiàorén
- Wade–Giles: Sung4 Chiao4-jen2

Dunchu
- Traditional Chinese: 鈍初
- Simplified Chinese: 钝初
Transcriptions
Standard Mandarin
- Hanyu Pinyin: Dùnchū
- Wade–Giles: Tun4-ch'u1

Song Jiaoren (Chinese: 宋敎仁; pinyin: Sòng Jiàorén; Wade–Giles: Sung Chiao-jen, [sʊ̂ŋ tɕjâʊɻə̌n]; 5 April 1882 – 22 March 1913) was a Chinese republican revolutionary and one of the founding leaders of the Kuomintang (KMT). An advocate of a parliamentary cabinet system to check the powers of Yuan Shikai, Song led the KMT to victory in China's first democratic election before being assassinated in Shanghai on 22 March 1913. His untimely death, widely attributed to Yuan, was regarded as having dashed the prospects for constitutional democracy in early 20th-century China.

== Early life ==
Song Jiaoren was born and educated in Hunan. When he was six years old, Song Jiaoren began his education at a private school. When Song was seventeen years old, he graduated and began enrollment at Taoyuan Zhangjiang College. The influence of his teachers, Huang Shouyi and Qu Fangmei, caused Song to make no effort to pursue the civil service examinations, and he was interested mainly in his time's world events and the counterculture. Song received excellent grades in college.

In August 1902, Song Jiaoren went to Wuchang to attend the Bishop Boone Memorial School (now the Central China Normal University), and in Wuchang, he met the revolutionary Huang Xing, and the two quickly became lifelong friends. Huang was soon forced to leave Wuchang due to his revolutionary activities, and returned to his hometown of Changsha. After Huang left, Song continued his organization of revolutionary groups in Hunan, especially in Changsha and Changde.

Later in 1902, Song was recruited to teach at the Wuchang Normal School, a prestigious private secondary school. Song arrived in Wuchang and began teaching in 1903. In Wuhan, Song became involved with various local revolutionary groups, including the Huaxinghui, a group of which he became vice president. However, the Wuchang Garden Hill Party especially appealed to him. Song often discussed politics and revolution with his students, many of whom were opposed to the idea of revolution.

== Early involvement in Kuomintang ==
Because of his revolutionary activities, Song in 1904 was forced to flee China for Japan, where he studied western political thought and made contacts among the expatriate Chinese student population and Japanese Pan-Asianists. During this period, Song was a close friend of the Japanese nationalist thinker Kita Ikki.

In 1905, together with Sun Yat-sen, Song helped to found and was a leading activist in the Tongmenghui, which was an organization dedicated to the overthrow of the Qing dynasty and the formation of a republic. Song returned to China in 1910 after the Xinhai Revolution and traveled to Hong Kong the next year to organize the Second Guangzhou Uprising. After the 1912 declaration of the Republic of China, Song helped to transform the Tongmenghui into the Kuomintang, also known as the KMT or Chinese Nationalist Party.

Song spoke out against the increasing authoritarianism of China's provisional president, Yuan Shikai, and expressed concerns towards Yuan's indications that he would like to restore a monarchical system to China with himself as emperor. On 1 January 1912, the Republic of China was established in Nanjing. Song was appointed to reform China's legal system, and he drafted a provisional constitution, the Republic of China Interim Government Organization Act.

== First Chinese election campaign ==
Song Jiaoren was only 30 when he was tasked by Sun Yat-sen to organize the Kuomintang for the 1912 Chinese democratic election campaign, the first in China. Song proved to be a naturally-skilled political organizer, but he had an arrogant self-confidence, which alienated many potential supporters. Only 10 percent of the adult males were allowed to vote, about 40 million in all, who were the gentry, landowners and middle-class merchants. They formed the political base of the new party. After the election, the Kuomintang won 269 of 596 seats in the House of Representatives and 123 of 274 seats in the Senate. Of the remaining seats, the majority were split between three rival parties, but over 300 small parties competed in the election. After the election, Song was widely regarded as a prime candidate for the position of prime minister.

One of Song's main political goals was to ensure that the powers and the independence of China's elected assemblies were properly protected from the influence of the office of the president. Song's goals in curtailing the office of the president conflicted with the interests of China's provisional president, Yuan Shikai. By mid-1912, clearly Yuan dominated over the provisional cabinet that he had named and was showing signs of a desire to hold overweening executive power. During Song's travels through China in 1912, he had openly and vehemently expressed the desire to limit the powers of the president in terms that often appeared openly critical of Yuan's ambitions. When the results of the 1913 elections indicated a clear victory for the Kuomintang, Song appeared to be in a position to exercise a dominant role in selecting the prime minister and cabinet, and the party could have proceeded to push for the election of a future president in a proper parliamentary setting.

== Assassination ==
On 20 March 1913, while traveling with a group of colleagues to the Parliament in Beijing, Song Jiaoren was shot twice at close range at the Shanghai Railway Station by a lone gunman, Wu Shiying, who had been contracted by Ying Guixin, a Shanghai underworld figure closely associated with the Yuan Shikai regime. Song died two days later in hospital. The trail of evidence led to the secretary of the cabinet and the provisional premier of Yuan Shikai's government, Zhao Bingjun. Although Yuan was considered by contemporary Chinese media sources the man most likely behind the assassination, the main conspirators investigated by authorities were themselves assassinated or disappeared mysteriously. Because of the lack of evidence, Yuan was never officially implicated. After an investigation revealed telegraphs implicating Ying Guixin in Song's assassination, Ying attempted to flee north, where Yuan could protect him, but was killed by two swordsmen while riding in a first-class train carriage. Zhao Bingjun was poisoned in 1914.

== Legacy ==
The political climate in China degenerated soon after Song Jiaoren's assassination, eventually leading to the failed Second Revolution. Yuan Shikai ejected the Kuomintang from China's elected assemblies in 1913, dissolved parliament in 1914, declared himself emperor in 1915, and died in 1916. After the failure of China's first democratic system to achieve a stable government, the country descended into more than a decade of warlordism.

== See also ==
- History of the Republic of China

== References and further reading ==
- Price, Don C. (2026), Song Jiaoren: A Republican Revolutionary and the Fate of Democracy in China, New York: Columbia University Press, ISBN 9780231221177

== Notes ==
New title	President of the Kuomintang; 1912–1913	Next: Sun Yat-sen as Premier of the KMT
