= Li Yonghe =

Chinese rebel leader circa 1859–1864

Li Yonghe (Chinese: 李永和) was a 19th-century rebel leader from Yunnan province, Qing dynasty China.

== Rebellion ==
In the autumn of 1859, as the Qing dynasty was plagued by the Taiping Rebellion, Nian rebellion and Panthay rebellion, Li Yonghe, with two brothers Lan Chaoding (Chinese: 蓝朝鼎) and Lan Chaozhu (Chinese: 蓝朝柱) raised a rebellion in their home province of Yunnan. They pledged to "kill rich landlords and officials" and to "defend the poor peasants." They used the name Daming Shuntian (Chinese: 大明顺天), or "Great Ming following Heaven". Li declared himself "King-following-Heaven" (Chinese: 顺天王), while Lan Chaoding and Lan Chaozhu were declared Grand Marshal and Vice Marshal respectively.

In September 1859, Li and Lan became members of the outlaw brotherhood Gelaohui, with whom they had significant contact with through the opium trafficking trade.

In February 1860, the rebel army of 100,000 troops crossed into Sichuan province, occupying more than 40 prefectures and counties and capturing the city of Mianyang. The rebel army expanded to nearly 300,000.

In 1861, Qing commander Luo Bingzhang was tasked to suppress the rebels with the newly established Xiang Army. By October 1862 Li had been defeated, captured and transported to Chengdu where he was executed. Lan Chaoding had similarly been killed in battle. The surviving rebels under Lan Chaozhu retreated northward to Shaanxi province, where Lan was declared Dahan Xianwang (Chinese: 大汉显王), or "Manifested King of the Great Han". The rebel forces linked up with Taiping Tianguo forces under Chen Baocai, and Lan received the title Wen Wang (Chinese: 文王), or "Cultured King" from the Heavenly King. He was also defeated and killed in 1864. The total casualties of the rebellion are estimated at over 100,000.

The rebellion was one of the first in China to have explicitly anti-Western politics, framing Europeans and Americans as "enemies of Heaven."
