= Hin Bus Depot =

Community hub in George Town, Penang, Malaysia

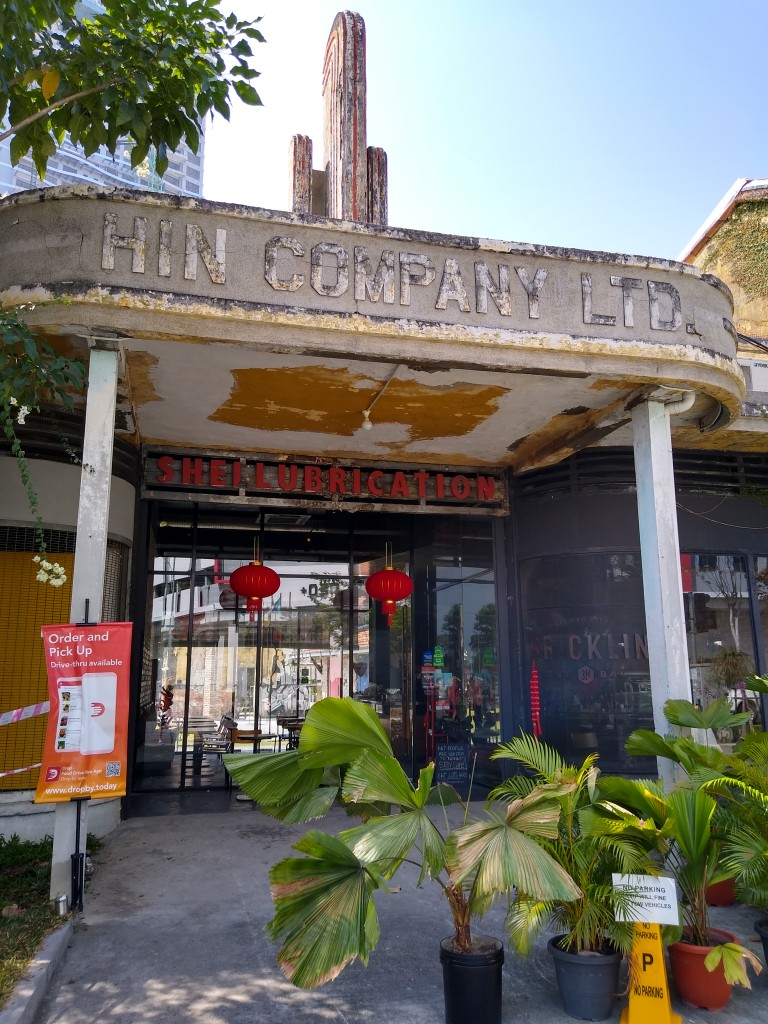
- Interactive map of the Hin Bus Depot area

General information
- Location: 31A Jalan Gurdwara, George Town, Penang, Malaysia, George Town, Malaysia
- Coordinates: 5.412049°N 100.328124°E

Website
- hinbusdepot.com

Hin Bus Depot is a community hub in George Town within the Malaysian state of Penang. It houses a gallery, arts and events spaces, and creative business outlets.

== History ==
In 1947, Hin Company Ltd., founded by Lim Teng Hin and his son, built the Hin Bus Depot along Brick Kiln Road (now known as Jalan Gurdwara) to house their iconic "Blue Buses."

In 1973, Hin was bought by Koperasi Gabungan Negeri, which was later was absorbed by the SJA Group in 2000. The depot closed in 1999 and the Blue Buses ceased operations in the early 2000s.

Under new owners, the depot was refurbished to temporarily host the first art exhibition of the Penang-based Lithuanian artist, Ernest Zacharevic.

Hin Bus Depot hosts a weekend market called Hin Market, with 70 stalls.
