= Huaxinghui =

Political organization

China Revival Society
- 華興會 华兴会
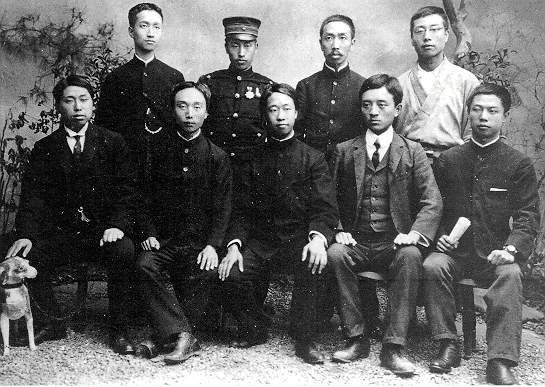
- China Revival Society leaders. Photo shot in 1905 in Tokyo. First row left: Huang Xing, fourth from left: Song Jiaoren
- Merged into: Tongmenghui
- Formation: February 15, 1904; 122 years ago
- Founder: Huang Xing
- Founded at: Changsha, Hunan
- Dissolved: July 30, 1905; 121 years ago
- Type: Revolutionary organization
- Headquarters: Changsha
- Leader: Huang Xing

The Huaxinghui (traditional Chinese: 華興會; simplified Chinese: 华兴会; pinyin: Huáxīng Huì; Wade–Giles: Hua-hsing hui), commonly translated as the China Revival Society or China Arise Society, was founded by Huang Xing and Zhang Shizhao on 15 February 1904 with the election of Huang Xing as its president, in Changsha of Hunan for the explicit political goal of overthrowing the Qing dynasty and establishing a democratic and free country. Many of its members later became key figures of the Tongmenghui.

Flag of the Huaxinghui

== Background ==
In 1903, Russian Empire made seven requests to the Qing Dynasty in an attempt to invade and occupy Northeast China. This action shook Japan. The Asahi Shimbun first published this news, and the Chinese students studying in Japan held a student conference at the Kinkikwan (錦輝館) in Tokyo. In early June, Huang Xing returned to China from Japan as an "athlete" of the Army and National Education Association (軍國民教育會) and planned new actions in Hunan and Hubei. On November 4, 1903, in the name of celebrating his 30th birthday, Huang Xing invited Liu Kuiyi (劉揆一), Song Jiaoren, Zhang Shizhao and others to hold a secret meeting at the home of Peng Yuanxun (彭淵恂), Baojia Bureau Lane, West District of Changsha, and decided to organize an anti-Qing revolutionary group to name "Huaxinghui", and called it "Huaxing Company" (華興公司) to the outside. The group's members amounted to hundreds of people, mostly intellectuals. Its purpose was to "expel the Tatar barbarians and revive Zhonghua" (驅除韃虜，復興中華); its strategy was to launch a war in Hunan, and the provinces respond to "go straight to Youyan" (直搗幽燕).

== History ==
The China Revival Society was dominated by students from Hunan who had returned from Japan. Nevertheless, from the very beginning it had strong ties with secret societies, especially with the Ko Lao Hui whose organizational structure the Huaxinghui paralleled, particularly in the field of the military chain of command. This connects to the primary goal of the Huaxinghui: to "kick out the Tartars" through assassinations of important Manchu officials.

After two failed plots, in November 1904 and early 1905, Huang Xing fled to Japan. There he met Sun Yat-sen in the summer of 1905 for the first time in Tokyo, in order to discuss the possibility of the merger of Sun's Xingzhonghui and the Huaxinghui. A compromise was reached, and Huang decided to support Sun fully. At this point the Huaxinghui had ceased to exist. On 20 August 1905, Sun Yat-sen was elected Tsung-li (premier) of the new party named Tongmenghui. Today historians generally agree that without the Huaxinghui's participation, the founding of the Tongmenghui would not have been possible.
