= Penang Islamic Museum =

Museum in Northeast, Penang, Malaysia

- Muzium Islam Pulau Pinang
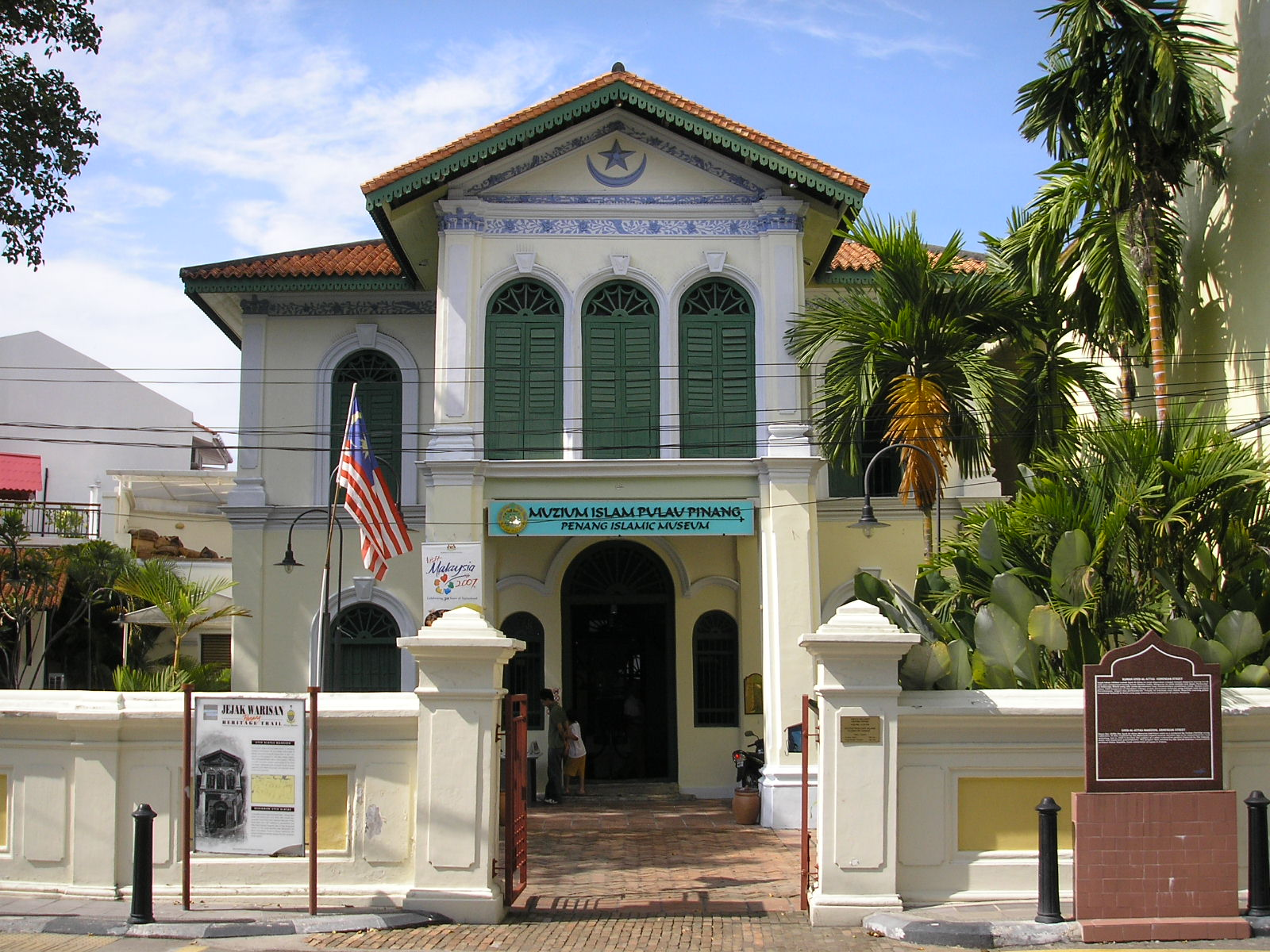
- Location: George Town, Penang, Malaysia
- Coordinates: 5°25′N 100°20′E
- Type: museum

The Penang Islamic Museum (Malay: Muzium Islam Pulau Pinang) is a museum about Islam in George Town, Penang, Malaysia.

== History ==
The museum is housed in a restored villa originally built in 1860 that was once the residence of a powerful Acehnese pepper merchant. Later it was used as a recycling depot for Penang's Indian Chettiar community. Restoration work was carried out in 1996 and it was awarded the Best Project award in 1999.

== Architecture ==
The museum building features mid 19th century Straits style.

== Exhibitions ==
The museum exhibits the role and contributions of Malay leaders in the growth and spread of Islam in Penang and Malaysia. It also houses the details on key 19th and early 20th century public figures and their influence in Penang. Another collection is the 19th century furniture and a life-sized diorama of a dock scene, which depicts a maritime-oriented hajj.

== See also ==
- List of museums in Malaysia
- Islam in Malaysia
