= 1910 Penang conference =

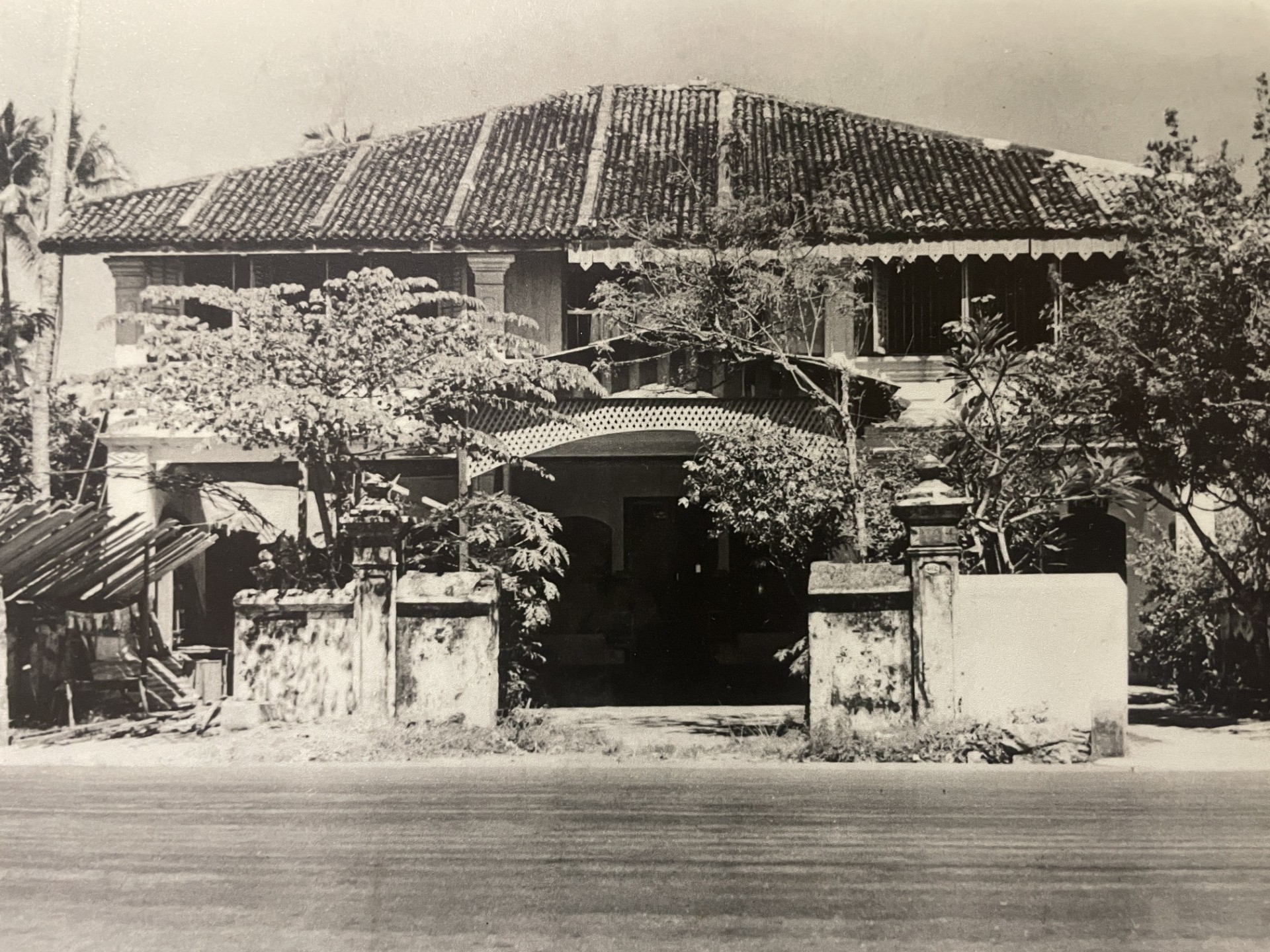
- 404 Dato' Kramat Road - Site of the 1910 Penang conference
- Date: 13 November 1910
- City: George Town, Penang, Federated Malay States
- Venue: 404 Dato' Kramat Road
- Participants: Sun Yat-sen

The 1910 Penang conference (Chinese: 庇能會議) was a meeting held at 404 Dato' Kramat Road in Penang on 13 November 1910, by Sun Yat-sen to stage a major revolt. The following day, on 14 November 1910, Sun Yat-sen chaired an Emergency Meeting of the Tongmenghui at 120 Armenian Street, now the Sun Yat-sen Museum Penang, and raised Straits Dollars $8,000 on the spot. The meeting focused on fund raising and the planning of a final revolution to overthrow the Qing dynasty that would make or break the Tongmenghui.

The conference paved the way for the Second Guangzhou Uprising (also known as the Yellow Flower Mound Uprising), serving as its primary planning and fundraising stage.

== Description ==
Participants included followers of Sun Yat-sen such as Huang Xing, Hu Hanmin, Zhao Sheng, Sun Mei, Dai Jitao, Goh Say Eng and Ooi Kim Kheng from Penang; Tung Yen from Seremban; and Li Xiehe from Indonesia. In total, 53 people participated.

The meeting planned the revolt to take place at Guangzhou. A financial goal was set to raise at least $100,000 among the overseas Chinese in Southeast Asia Nanyang. The new army of Guangdong was to be the main force of the revolt. The Tongmenghui headquarters in Tokyo was not told of this meeting, and party leaders who opposed or doubted him were not invited.

After this meeting Sun would leave Penang for North America, United States. There are multiple possible causes on why he was banned. One reason was that he was ordered by the British colonial authorities to leave Penang because of his public criticism of British colonial rule. Another reason was that Straits administrator John Anderson ordered him to be banned because of inflammatory speech to incite support for his anti-Manchu revolutions on 26 November 1910, at a Chinese club.

The 1910 Penang Conference was re-enacted in the Chinese movie Road To Dawn (2007).

== See also ==
- Chinese revolutionary activities in Malaya
