= Ernest Zacharevic =

Public artist in Penang, Malaysia

Ernest Zacharevic (born 1986 in Lithuania) is a multidiscipline contemporary and public artist based in Penang, Malaysia.

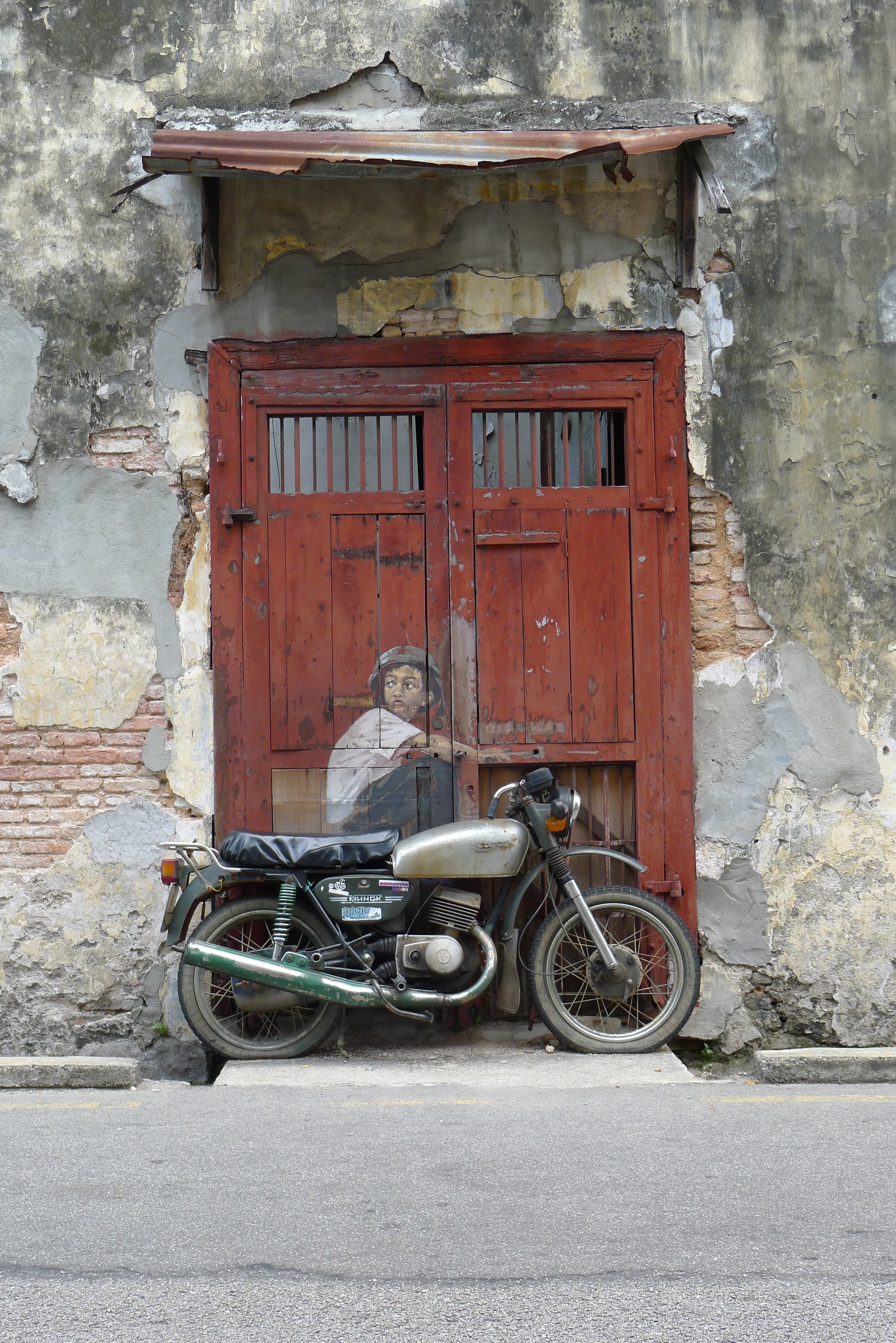
'Boy on Motorcycle' street installation from Ernest Zacharevic

== Technique and style ==
Zacharevic creates oil paintings, installations, sculptures and stencil and spray paint to produce culturally relevant compositions both inside gallery space and in the arena of public art and walls His interest in the outdoor pieces is in the interaction between murals and the urban landscape, with concepts arising as part of a spontaneous response to the environment. As well as his on street works, Zacharevic creates originals on canvas and found objects alike. These works belong to private collections and institutions across the world including the Ritz Carlton and Dean Collection, a private collection of works owned and maintained by Swizz Beats.

== Career ==
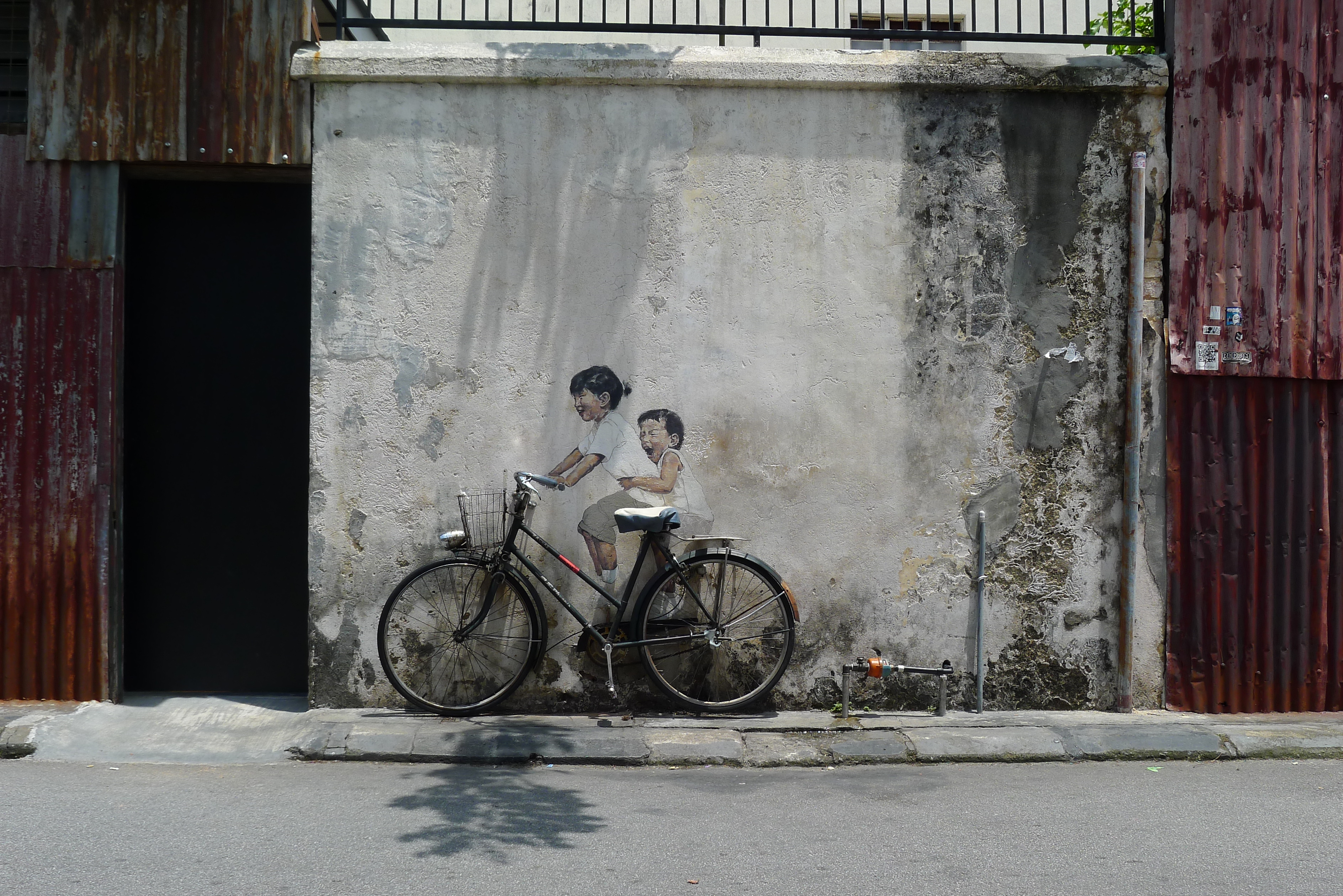
Children on Bicycle, George Town Festival 2012

In 2012, Zacharevic received worldwide recognition after creating a series of six street art murals for the George Town Festival in Penang, Malaysia, with the BBC calling him Malaysia's answer to Banksy. These images depict scenes of everyday Malaysian life, using local people as the models. The two most popular are Children on Bicycle and Boy on Motorcycle; a combination of installation and painting allows the outside community to interact with the works. These murals now stand as cultural landmarks in George Town, complete with plaques and frequent queues of people waiting to have their photographs taken with the works.

Zacharevic held his first solo show, Art is Rubbish Rubbish is Art, in Penang in 2012 at the Hin Bus Depot, a centre for arts and culture located in George Town. A collection of 30-plus works were painted on reclaimed and found materials.

In 2013 Zacharevic received viral attention for his on-street work with his controversial mural depicting Lego minifigures in Johor Bahru, home to a Malaysian Legoland. Using Lego figures, Zacharevic commented on the violent state of JB, positioning them on a street corner, as a woman carrying a Chanel bag approaches, a masked villain waits around the corner for her. The piece was buffed over quickly, but not before the image went viral, with thousands of people showing their support for the mural and the serious statement it was making.

Zacharevic also painted a series of murals in Singapore, one of the most restrictive countries in the world in terms of street art. He created Children in Shopping Trolleys, and one of his most iconic concepts Style Wars. The piece sees two duelling children about to engage in combat with mops and brooms upon crayon illustrated horses.

In 2014 Zacharevic opened his second solo show, "Rock, Paper, Scissors", in Barcelona at Montana Gallery. The collection saw a juxtaposition of more figurative works featuring characters from different cultures, with a range of dynamic poses and actions.

in 2015 Zacharevic held a solo exhibition at the Underdogs gallery in Lisbon Portugal; this was the first public exhibition of his origami-themed body of work entitled The Floor is Lava. Since this time he has been travelling around the world for independent projects, producing beautiful walls globally.

Since 2016 Zacharevic has directed focus to the initiation of the Splash and Burn Project, an artist-led artivism campaign which used street art to communicate issues concerning the unsustainable production of Palm oil in South East Asia. Since its inception, the project has collaborated with 9 international artists all creating works to generate awareness of the issues towards positive change.

== Replay NYC ==
In September 2015 Zacharevic and photographer Martha Cooper began their series of collaborations entitled “ReplayNYC.” The project was inspired by Cooper’s iconic book "Street Play” which captured carefree New York City kids in the late 1970s. In his signature style, Zacharevic brings Cooper’s subjects back to the streets, combining elements of painting and installation. Seven works were carefully curated by Cooper and Zacharevic, with each image corresponding to a specific location to illustrate the vibrant, ever-changing landscape of New York City. Most of these paintings have disappeared, existing now only through Cooper’s photos.

This on-street project was showcased for the first time in 2016 at the Long Beach Museum of Art; Cooper’s original images were paired with the photographs of Zacharevic’s recreations. Also featured were in-progress photos of the project, along with a wider selection of Cooper’s images from around the world of children engaged in creative play.

== Splash and Burn ==
Splash and Burn is a public art project curated by Zacharevic and coordinated by Charlotte Pyatt, run in association with the SOS Sumatran Orangutan Society and the OIC Orangutan Information Centre. The aim is to provide an alternative platform for organisations and NGOs fighting to initiate positive change by embracing the presence of the street art community, inviting international artists to create murals/sculptures and interventions in and around the urban landscape of Medan, Indonesia. Zacharevic hopes to raise a wider consciousness of conservation issues globally while helping to facilitate relationships with communities directly. Splash and Burn is an ongoing initiative. The latest project was realised in 2019 by Spanish artist ESCIF, which involved a rewind symbol carved into a palm oil plantation in Indonesia to be rewilded with trees indigenous to the surrounding rainforests. In collaboration with Indonesian musician Nursalim Yadi Anugerah, REWILD was accompanied by a short film produced by Studio Birthplace currently on the festival circuit.

=== Recent work ===
In May 2016, Zacharevic went to Christmas Island, an Australian territory in the Indian Ocean at the invitation of Christmas Island Phosphates and the local Shire government for a scoping trip to beautify the island landscape. He left behind his first-ever Australian art installation with "Forklift Boy", near a local tavern. An abandoned forklift adjacent to a shipping container provided the canvas for the piece. It is similar in aesthetic to his Boy and Girl on a Bike and Boy on a Motorbike art installations in George Town, Penang.

== Controversy ==
On 25 November 2024, it was reported that Zacharevic was seeking an explanation from Tony Fernandes, the founder of AirAsia, following a spotting of one of the artist's creative murals, Children on Bicycle being depicted on the livery of one of the airline's planes at the Penang International Airport.
