= Tao Chengzhang =

Chinese politician (1878–1912)

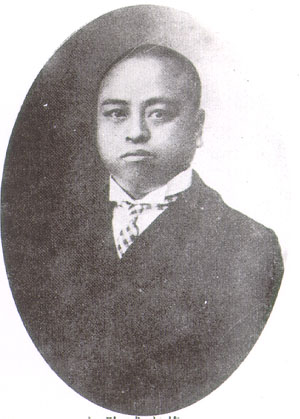
Tao Chengzhang

Tao Chengzhang (January 24, 1878 – January 14, 1912) was a Chinese political leader during the Xinhai Revolution period. He was one of the founders of the Restoration Society, along with Cai Yuanpei and others. In 1905 he founded the Datong Normal School to educate the revolutionaries. In 1908, he founded the Revolutionary Association, willing to build a society without classes. Tao was a long time opposer of Sun Yat-sen. He was assassinated by Chiang Kai-shek under the orders of Chen Qimei.
