= Family tree of Sun Yat-sen =

This is a family tree of Sun Yat-sen, the first provisional president of the Republic of China. The following chart uses Mandarin pinyin romanization. Some members may have been referred to in the Cantonese, Hakka, Hokkien at one time or another. Pre-marriage surnames are used.

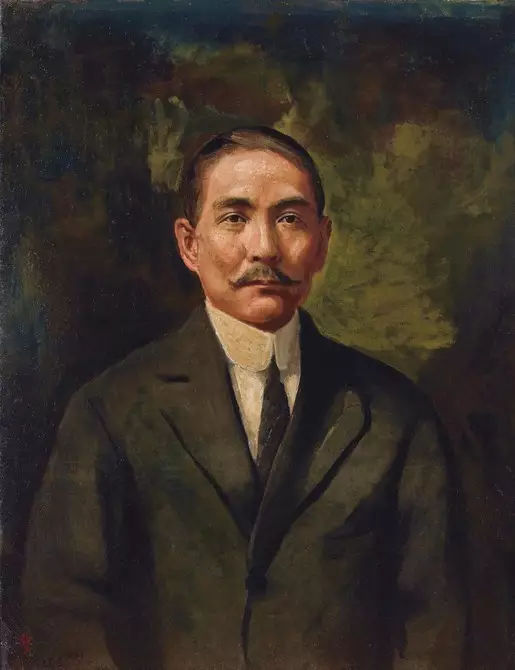
"Portrait of Sun Yat-sen" (1921) Li Tiefu Oil on Canvas 93×71.7cm

== Chinese family tree ==
Sun Dian-zhao (孫殿朝)	Lady Lin (林氏)
Sun Heng-hui (孫恆輝)	Lady Cheng (程氏)
Sun Jing-xian (孫敬賢)	Lady Wong (黃氏)
Sun Da-cheng (孫達成)	Madame Yang (楊氏)
Sun De-zhang (孫德彰) aka Sun Mei (孫眉)	Sun Jin-xing (孫金星)	Sun Dak-you (孫德祐)	Sun Miao-xi (孫妙茜)	Sun Qiu-qi (孫秋綺)	Sun Yat-sen (孫中山)	Lu Muzhen (盧慕貞)	Chen Cui-fen (陳粹芬)	Soong Ching-ling (宋慶齡)
Sun Jin-wan (孫金婉)	Sun Jin-yuan (孫金媛)	Sun Fo (孫科)	Chen Shu-ying (陳淑英)	Lan ni (藍妮)	Yan Ai-juan (嚴靄娟)
Zhang Jia-gong (張嘉恭)	Sun Sui-hua (孫穗華)	Lin Da-wen (林達文)	Sun Sui-ying (孫穗英)	Lin Lun-ke (林倫可)	Sun Zi-qiang (孫治強)	Liu Zhao-yun (劉肇雲)	Zhang Pei-xia (張佩霞)	Xie Xiu-ling (謝秀玲)	Sun Zhi-ping (孫治平)	Nora Sun (孫穗芬)	Lily Sun (孫穗芳)
Mo Nian-qi (莫念齊)	Zhang Kong-yin (張孔穎)	Fu Yue-han (傅約翰)	Zhang Yue-zhen (張樂眞)	An Shi-de (安施德)	Zhang le-wen (張樂文)	Shi Da-wei (史大偉)	Lin Shu-zhen (林淑眞)	Ni Wei-na (倪偉娜)	Lin Jie (林傑)	Sun Guo-sheng (孫國陞)	Sun Guo-yuan (孫國元)	Sun Jia-yu (孫嘉瑜)	Situ Bai-li (司徒白理)	Sun Jia-lin (孫嘉琳)	Sun Guo-wei (孫國偉)	Sun Xiu-lan (孫秀蘭)	Leland Sun (孫國雄)	Eileen Fujimoto
Zhang Meng-lu (張孟祿)	Zhang Meng-bo (張孟博)	Fu Min-yi (傅民意)	Fu Shi-yi (傅詩意)	An Ma-xu (安馬旭)	Sun Ren-ai (孫仁愛)	Tai	Sun Mei-ren (孫美仁)	Sun Wei-ren (孫偉仁)	Sun Mei-lian (孫美蓮)	Sun Mei-lan (孫美蘭)	Sun Mei-ling (孫美玲)

== Japanese family tree ==
Sun Yat-sen (孫中山)	Kaoru Otsuki (大月薰)
Yoshiji Osawa (大澤吉次)	Fumiko Miyagawa (宮川富美子)
Tōichi Miyagawa (宮川東一)	Hiroshi Miyagawa (宮川弘)
Sachiko Miyakawa (宮川祥子)

Motomune Sanekata (実方元心)
Motonobu Sanekata

== See also ==
- Four big families of the Republic of China
