= Ōtsuki (surname) =

Ōtsuki (大月 or 大槻) is a Japanese surname. Alternative transliterations include Otsuki, Ootsuki and Ohtsuki. Notable people with the surname include:

- Fumihiko Ōtsuki (大槻 文彦, 1847–1928), Japanese lexicographer, linguist, and historian
- Fujiko Ōtsuki (大月 フジコ, born 1932), Swedish Classical musical pianist
- Haruaki Otsuki (大月 晴明, born 1973), Japanese kickboxer
- Hibiki Ōtsuki (大槻 ひびき, born 1988), Japanese AV actress and idol singer
- Hideyuki Ohtsuki (大月 秀幸, born 1957), Japanese actor
- Hiroshi Otsuki (大槻 紘士, born 1980), Japanese football player and manager
- Kaoru Otsuki (大月 薰, 1888–1970), was the second wife of Sun Yat-sen
- Kazuto Otsuki (大槻 一人, born 1973), Japanese singer
- Kenji Ohtsuki (大槻 ケンヂ / 大槻 賢二, born 1966), Japanese rock musician
- Miyako Otsuki (大月 みやこ, born 1946), Japanese singer
- Miyako Otsuki (actress) (大槻 美也子), a semi-regular cast on Ultraman Leo
- Shuhei Otsuki (大槻 周平, born 1989), Japanese football player
- Takayuki Ōtsuki (大月 孝行), the perpetrator of the Hikari Parent-child Murder Incident
- Takeji Ōtsuki (大槻 武二, 1906–2004), founder of the third largest independent Japanese church, Holy Ecclesia of Jesus
- Tsuyoshi Otsuki (大槻 毅, born 1972), Japanese football player and manager
- Ulf Ōtsuki (大月 ウルフ, 1934–2020), Japanese-German actor
- Yuhei Otsuki (大槻 優平, born 1988), Japanese footballer

== Fictional characters ==
- Ootsuki (大月), a character from Umineko When They Cry
- Koto Ōtsuki (大月 琴), a character from Senryu Girl
- Tarou Ootsuki (大槻 太郎), a character from Kaiji and Mr. Tonegawa: Middle Management Blues
- Yui Ohtsuki (大槻 唯), a character from The Idolmaster
