= Sun Yat Sen Memorial House =

Museum in São Lázaro, Macau

Coordinates: 22.199875°N 113.548981°E

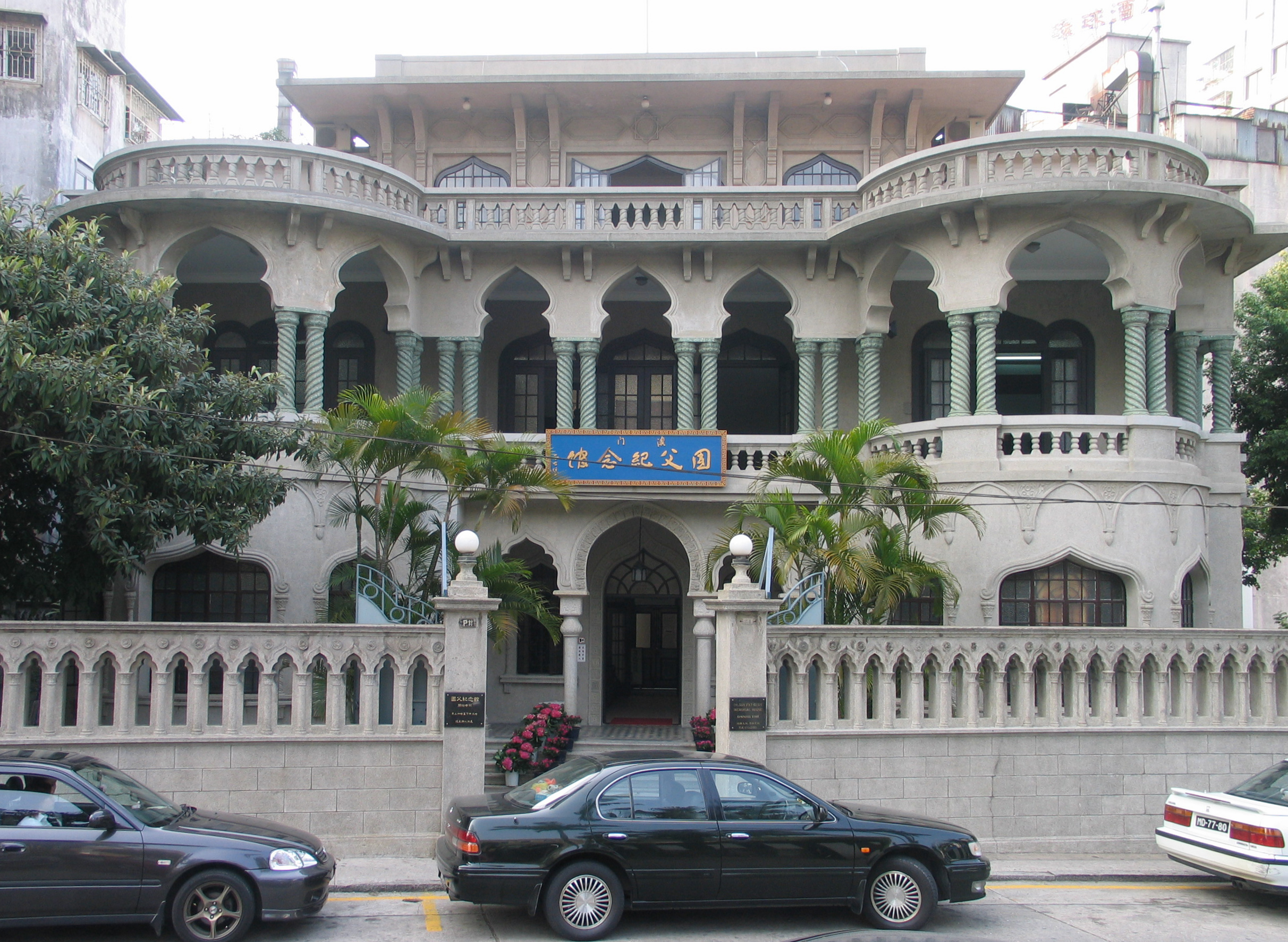
- Sun Yat Sen Memorial House at Av. Sidonio Pais, Macau.

Chinese name
- Traditional Chinese: 澳門國父紀念館
- Simplified Chinese: 澳门国父纪念馆
Transcriptions
Standard Mandarin
- Hanyu Pinyin: Àomén Guófù Jìniànguǎn
Yue: Cantonese
- Jyutping: ou3 mun4*2 gwok3 fu6 gei2 nim6 gun2

Portuguese name
- Portuguese: Casa Memorial do Dr. Sun Yat-Sen

Sun Yat Sen Memorial House (Chinese: 澳門國父紀念館; Portuguese: Casa Memorial do Dr. Sun Yat-Sen) or Memorial House of Dr. Sun Yat Sen is a museum located in São Lázaro, Macau, China where former family members and relatives of Sun Yat-sen, the 'Father of Modern China' used to live. The House bears witness to his short but significant stay in Macau in the early 20th century where Macau serve as the starting point for Dr. Sun's travels around the world; it also act as an important venue in which he conducted revolutionary activities and finally as the ideal place he chose to settle his family in later years.

== History ==
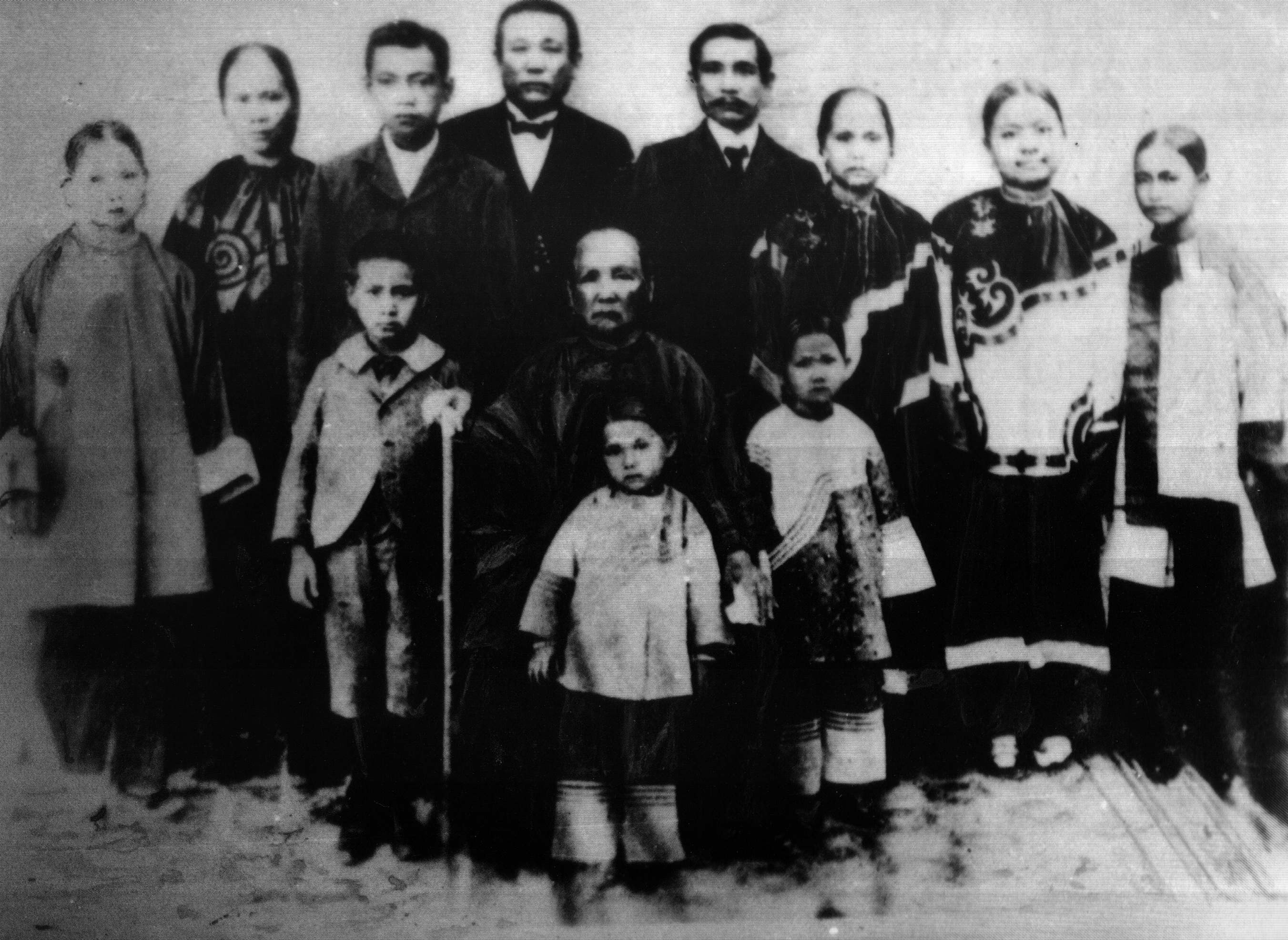
Dr. Sun (Back row, fourth from the left) and his family in Honolulu, circa 1901.

Known formerly as "Mansion of Sun", the House was built in 1912 as residence for his first wife, Lu Muzhen. It is located within walking distance of Lou Lim Ieoc Garden where Dr. Sun once stay during his later visits to Macau in 1912. Designed in mock-moorish style, the House is a three-storey high building with ornate verandahs and spacious courtyards.

Lu Muzhen settled down in the House in 1913 with their two daughters, Sun Yan (孙延), Sun Wan (孙琬) and son Sun Ke at Dr. Sun's request. She lived in Macau for 40 years before dying at the age of 85 on 7 September 1952. A son-in-law of hers and a granddaughter lived over a long period of time and died in Macau too. Another notable mention is Dr. Sun's elder brother Sun Mei (孙眉) and his wife moved to Macau in 1913 and settled in together with Lu Muzhen, where he conducted business and organised a fishermen's association in Macau. Sun Mei died in Macau at the age of 60 on 11 February 1915.

Macau is a fusion of Chinese and Western culture that stretches back to the 16th century when it was opened up as a harbour for trade with the West. Dr. Sun's former residence in the village of Cuiheng, Xiangshan County in China is only 37 kilometres from Macau. Both Cuiheng and Macau were historically under the sway of Xiangshan County before gradually succumbing to the occupation of the Portuguese in the second half of 19th century.

Dr. Sun's father, Sun Dacheng was a Macau resident. He arrived in Macau at the age of 16 to work as a cobbler in a shoe shop in Largo do S. Domingos before returning to his hometown 16 years later to farm and marry a year later to Lady Yang, Dr. Sun's mother. In 1879, she took 13-year-old Dr. Sun to Macau and he consequently became familiar with the territory. From whence he accompanied his mother on his first sea voyage on board the British iron ship S.S. Grannock bound for Honolulu in Hawaii to embark upon a western education. In 1884, five years after his first voyage, the young man went abroad again by ship from Macau once more. Subsequently, Macau was to serve as the starting point for Dr. Sun to leave his own country and travel around the world.

=== Medical practice ===
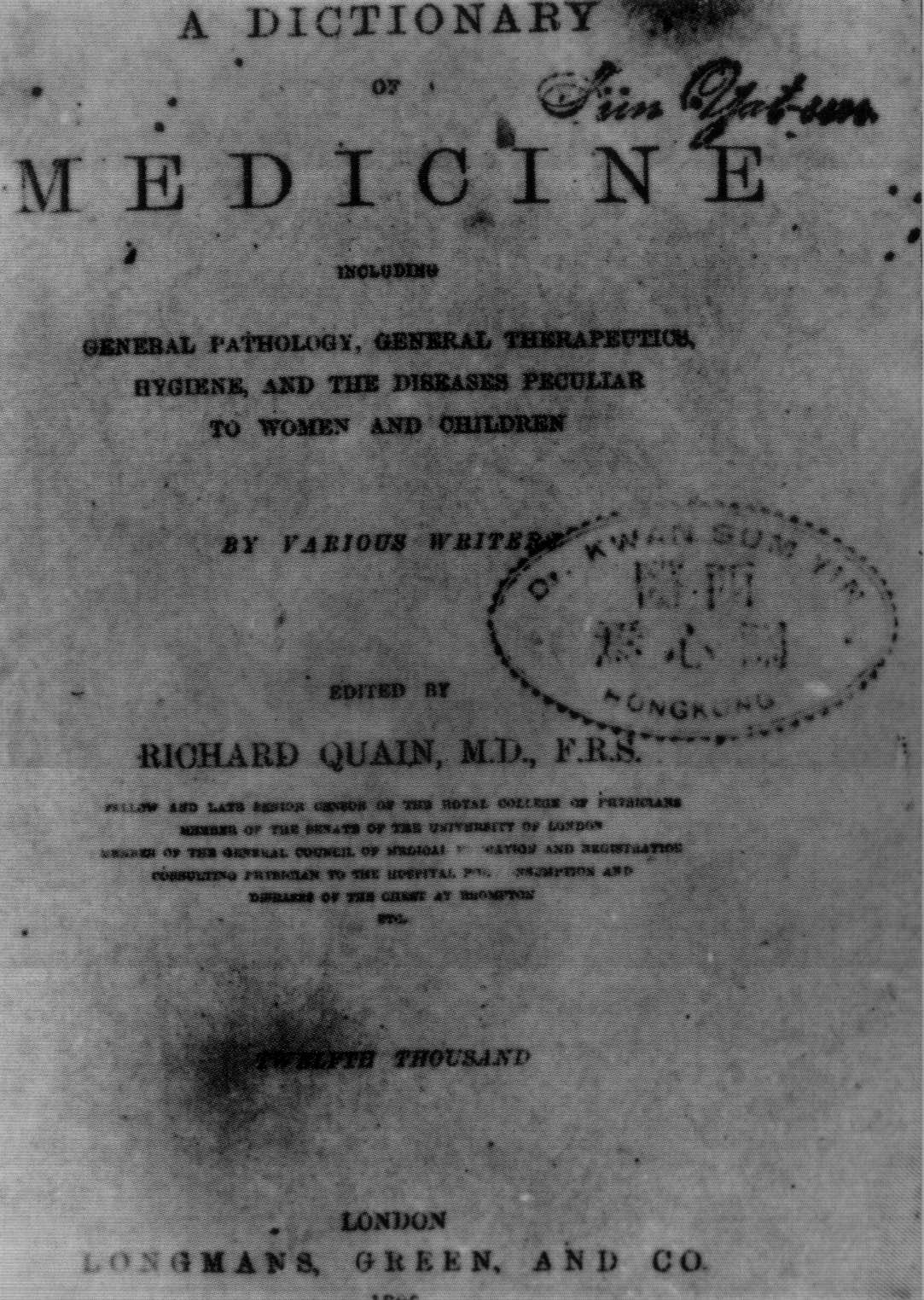
A dictionary formerly used by Dr. Sun while learning medicine at the College of Medicine for Chinese, circa 1890s.

At the age of 26, Sun Yat-Sen graduated from the Hong Kong College of Medicine for Chinese. In 1892, Dr. Sun was invited by Kiang Wu Hospital in Macau to set up the Western Medicine Department as a voluntary doctor and diagnosed patients for free. He became the first Chinese doctor to practice Western medicine in Macau. With borrowed funds from the hospital, he subsequently opened the Chinese-Western Medicine Joint Clinic in Rua das Estalagens and was well known for his outstanding medical skills and enjoyed widespread admiration in the community.

=== Revolutionary activities ===
Whilst studying at the Hong Kong College of Medicine for Chinese, the young Dr. Sun constantly travelled between Hong Kong and Macau to criticise the corruption of the Qing regime and agitated for revolution to save the country. He, along with Chan Siu-bak, Yau Lit and Yeung Hok-ling, were known as the Si Da Kou (Four Bandits). During this period, Sun Yat-Sen made many revolutionary statements and his first great essay—Letter to Zheng Zaoru—in his anthology was published by a Macau newspaper in 1890.

During the Chinese Revolutionary Party years straddling 1915, Sun Yat-Sen and his associates regarded Macau as an important base for their defensive activities in Southern China. The Chinese in Macau provided valuable support for Dr. Sun at all times and supported his revolutionary enterprises materially and spiritually. The support from them and the overseas Chinese was an important chapter of the Chinese republican revolution. Dr. Sun also made frequent contact with the thinker, reformer and entrepreneur Zheng Guanying (郑观应). Later, two of his earlier essays were incorporated in Zheng's Sheng Shi Wei Yan ("Warnings to a Prosperous Age"), a collection of his works that act as a welcome boost to Dr. Sun fledgling revolutionary aspirations.

While making revolutionary plans in Macau, Dr. Sun maintained good relationships not only with the Chinese in Macau but also with Portuguese lawyers. Dr. Sun during his studies in Hong Kong made the acquaintance of Francisco Hermenegildo Fernandes, a Macanese working as clerk in the Hong Kong Courts, where he served as Chinese interpreter. Fernandes' family was in the printing industry in Macau. In July 1893, Fernandes set up Macau's first weekly Chinese newspaper, Echo Macaense (Ching-Hai Tsung-Pao), from which news about Sun Yat-Sen's medical practice in Macau and his early revolutionary activities gained ongoing coverage. As a Macanese, Fernandes accepted democratic ideology prevalent in Western countries at that time, and thus he was sympathetic towards, and supported Dr. Sun's revolutionary cause. A deep friendship consequently blossomed between them. Fernandes died in 1923 and was interred in Macau's Cemiterio S. Miguel Arcanjo.

On 13 February 1912, Sun Yat-Sen resigned his position as provisional President of the Republic of China and conducted an inspection tour of China to invigorate its development, visiting Macau in May 1912 and June 1913. In May 1919, Sun Yat-Sen expelled the warlord Gui Xi (Guizhou military clique) in Guangdong and assigned his son Sun Ke to set up an office at the Rua de Inacio Baptista No. 10 to plan and agitate on behalf of the Constitutional Protection Movement. In 1922, Sun Yat-Sen supported the anti-tyranny wishes of the Chinese people of Macau and received a petition delegation from Macau workers in Guangzhou to make every effort to defend the Macau populace.

=== Lou Lim Ieoc Garden ===
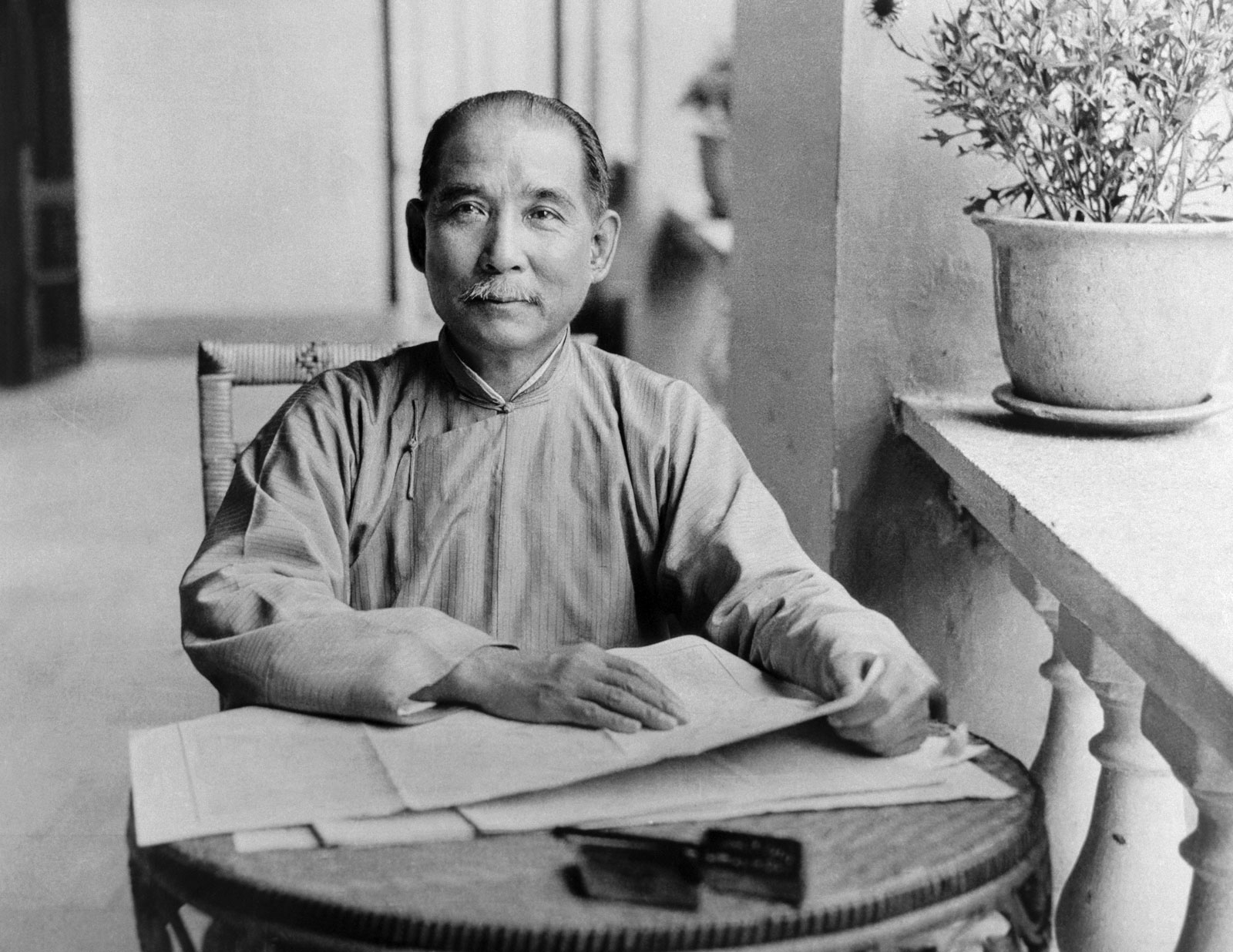
Dr. Sun, circa 1924.

In May 1912, Sun accepted the invitation by Chinese businessmen to pay a return visit to Macau. It had been 17 years since he first visited the territory. He was warmly received by the Chinese and Portuguese communities in Macau then. Accompanied by his beloved eldest daughter, Sun Wan, he spend two nights at the Spring Herb Hall (former name of Lou Lim Ieoc Garden) built earlier by business man Lou Lim Ieoc, who was the chairman of Kiang Wu Hospital.

Sun Yat-Sen was too occupied by military affairs to return to Macau after 1913 but nevertheless remained in close contact with Macau. Sun Yat-Sen died in Beijing on 12 March 1925. Over 20,000 people (one fifth of the city's population then) in Macau attended the solemn memorial ceremony held at Kiang Wu Hospital on 29 March 1925. Since his passing, Macau has hosted large-scale ceremonies over the decades to commemorate the birthday of Dr. Sun and the Xinhai Revolution. In November 2006, a photographic commemoration exhibition was organised by the Macau Government Tourist Board and Macau History Association in his honour. In addition, Macau has dedicated three grand statues of Dr. Sun and has named one memorial hall, one garden and two new roads after him too.

== The Memorial House today ==
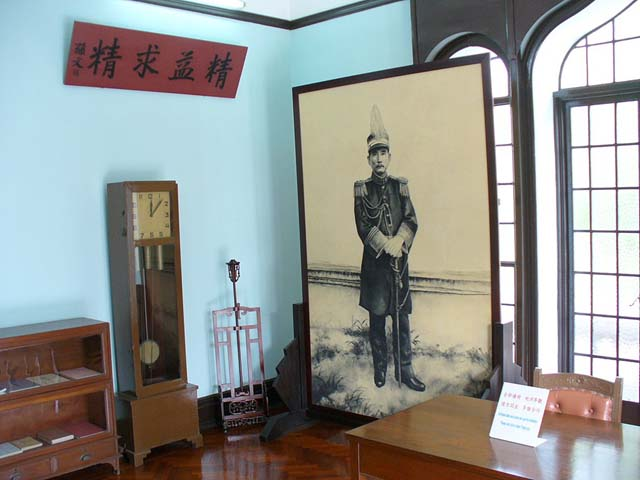
The interior of Dr. Sun Yat Sen Memorial House today.

In 1933, the House was reconstructed and was renamed to its present name in 1958. A full-length bronze statue of Dr. Sun in the courtyard was cast by his Japanese friend Shōkichi Umeya in 1934. Three other identical bronze statues of Dr. Sun now stand at Sun Yat-sen Mausoleum in Nanjing, the Whampoa Military Academy in Kaohsiung and the Sun Yat-sen University in Guangzhou.

The House is currently open to the public which showcases his books, letters, photographs, personal belongings and old newspapers accounts of his life and the Chinese republican revolution which finally overthrew the regime of the Qing Dynasty in 1911.

The property is owned by Taiwan's Mainland Affairs Council, and in September 2022, SCMP reported that Beijing may seize the property if employees at the Taipei Economic and Cultural Office in Macau do not sign a pledge recognizing the one-China principle.

== See also ==
- Former Residence of Sun Yat-sen, Shanghai
- National Chiang Kai-shek Memorial Hall
- Sun Yat Sen Nanyang Memorial Hall
- Sun Yat-sen Mausoleum
- Sun Yat-sen Memorial Hall
- List of museums in Macau
