= Ōtsuki =

Ōtsuki may refer to:

- Ōtsuki, Yamanashi, a city in Yamanashi Prefecture, Japan
- Ōtsuki Station, a railway station in Ōtsuki, Yamanashi, Japan
- Ōtsuki, Kōchi, a town in Hata District, Kōchi Prefecture, Japan
- Ōtsuki (surname), a Japanese surname
