= Chen Cuifen =

Chinese revolutionary (1874–1962)

- 陳粹芬
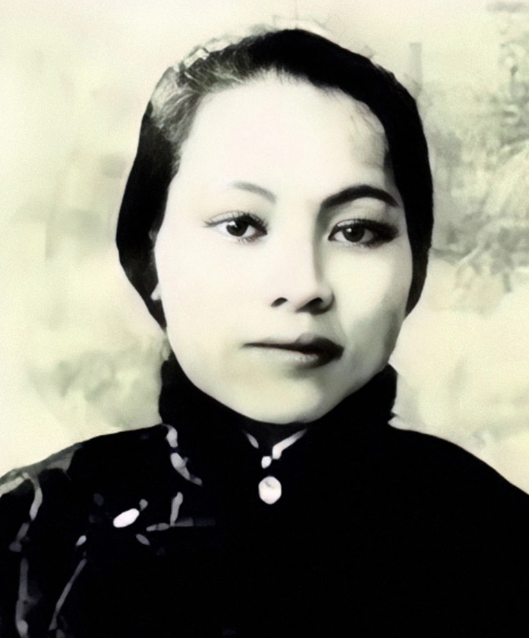
- Born: 23 September 1874; Tuen Mun, Hong Kong, Qing dynasty
- Died: 21 October 1962 (aged 88); British Hong Kong
- Other names: 香菱, 瑞芬
- Partner(s): Sun Yat-sen (concubine, 1892–1925)

Chinese name
- Traditional Chinese: 陳粹芬
- Simplified Chinese: 陈粹芬
Transcriptions
Standard Mandarin
- Hanyu Pinyin: Chén Cuìfēn

Chen Cuifen (Chinese: 陳粹芬; 23 September 1874 – 21 October 1962) was a longtime romantic partner of Sun Yat-sen, the founder and first president of the Republic of China. She was regarded as a "forgotten revolutionary" and "the first revolution partner" of Sun Yat-sen. Before marrying Soong Ching-ling, Sun Yat-sen had a 20 year-relationship with Chen Cuifen. In the "Sun Family Genealogy", Chen was officially recorded as "Sun Yat-sen's concubine".

== Biography ==
Chen was born in Tuen Mun, Hong Kong in 1874, the fourth child of a family originally from Xiamen.

Chen and Sun Yat-Sen met in 1891 in Hong Kong while Sun was studying medicine at the Hong Kong College of Medicine for Chinese. Sun told Chen that he would become the next Hong Xiuquan and overthrow the Qing Dynasty, which deeply impressed her. Chen and Sun became romantic partners, and Chen became involved in Sun's revolutionary work.

Chen moved with Sun first to Macau, then to Canton. After the failure of the First Guangzhou Uprising, Chen followed Sun to Japan. In Japan, Chen was involved in arranging arms for the 1900 uprising in Huizhou. During this period, she also became well known to many Chinese revolutionaries, including Chiang Kai-Shek for her dedication to the revolution and her domestic care for Sun and others amid a tough period for the revolutionaries. She lived in Penang from 1910 until 1912. In Southeast Asia, Chen was known as Sun's wife, despite Sun still being married to Lu Muzhen. After the success of the Xinhai Revolution, Chen moved back to China, but found that Sun Yat-sen no longer had affection for her. For a time Chen lived with the family of Sun Mei, Sun Yat-sen's older brother, in Macau.

After the establishment of the Republic, she settled in Malaya alone where she adopted a daughter, Sun Rong, and engaged in business ventures, including establishing a rubber plantation. Sun Rong would later marry into the Sun family, marrying one of the descendants of Sun Mei. This marriage was strongly opposed by Sun family elders, such as Lu Muzhen, as Chen had given her daughter the surname Sun, which would mean marrying another member of the Sun clan would be akin to incest. However, since the couple was not biologically related, Sun Rong was allowed to renounce the name Sun and then marry into the Sun family. Chen Cuifen spent her final years in Hong Kong, where she died in 1962. Chen Cuifen was ultimately interred in the Sun family tomb in Cuiheng.

== Film portrayals ==
In the film Road To Dawn (2007), which features the story of Sun Yat-sen in Penang, the character of Chen Cuifen is played by Chinese actress Wu Yue.
