= Cuifen =

Cuifen is a Chinese given name. Notable people with the name include:

- Chen Cuifen (1874–1962), Chinese revolutionary and businesswoman
- Cao Cuifen (born 1944), Chinese actress
