= Madame Yang =

Mother of Sun Yat-sen

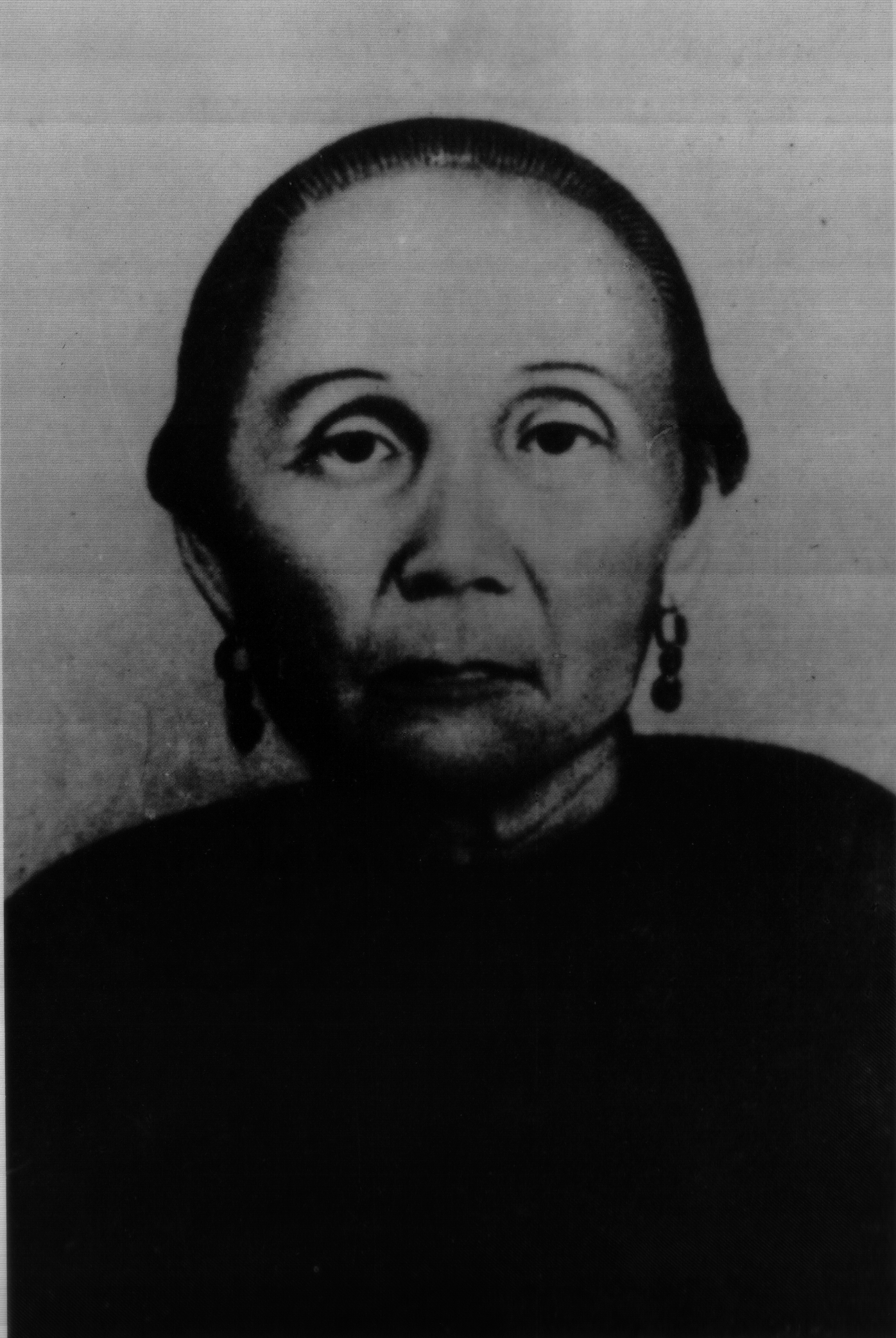

Madame Yang (19 July 1827 – 19 July 1910), also known as Lady Yang, was the mother of Sun Yat-sen.

== Biography ==
Madame Yang gave birth to Sun Yat-sen in the village of Cuiheng, Xiangshan County (now Zhongshan City), Guangdong, in 1866, when she was 39 years old.

In 1878, when Sun Yat-sen was 13, she brought him from Macau to Honolulu by boat so he could live with his elder brother, Dezhang. Madame Yang returned to China the same year.

After the failure of the First Guangzhou Uprising in 1895, Sun Yat-sen was placed on the wanted list by the Qing court and his family became at risk of being captured. Lu Muzhen, Sun Yat-sen's first wife, took her children and Madame Yang to stay with Dezhang in Honolulu. Later, after Dezhang became bankrupt from funding Sun Yat-sen's revolutionary activities, Madame Yang, along with the other family members in Honolulu, moved to Ngau Chi Wan in Kowloon, Hong Kong.

== Grave ==
Madame Yang died at the Tung Tau Tsuen home on July 19, 1910, on her 83rd birthday. Sun Yat-sen was fundraising in Singapore at the time, and a member of the Tongmenghui arranged the burial. The grave is located near Fei Ngo Shan Road, in Pak Fa Lam, Sai Kung, New Territories.

In May 2000, the government contacted Sun Yat-sen's descendants to form long-term maintenance plans for the site. A large hole was discovered on top of the tomb, and the Hong Kong Chung Shan Research Institute began to fund-raise HK$1,000,000 for the repair. The Institute received permission from Sun Yat-sen's eldest grandson for repairs, and emergency repair works were carried out in October 2000. The Antiquities and Monuments Office was tasked with monitoring the grave, and repairing it when necessary. The Antiquities Advisory Board also undertook studies to determine whether to consider the grave a declared monument.

In 2017, markers pointing to her grave were vandalized. The Sun Yat-sen Institute's president, Lee Sung-wai, had his friends repair the markers.

== Gallery ==
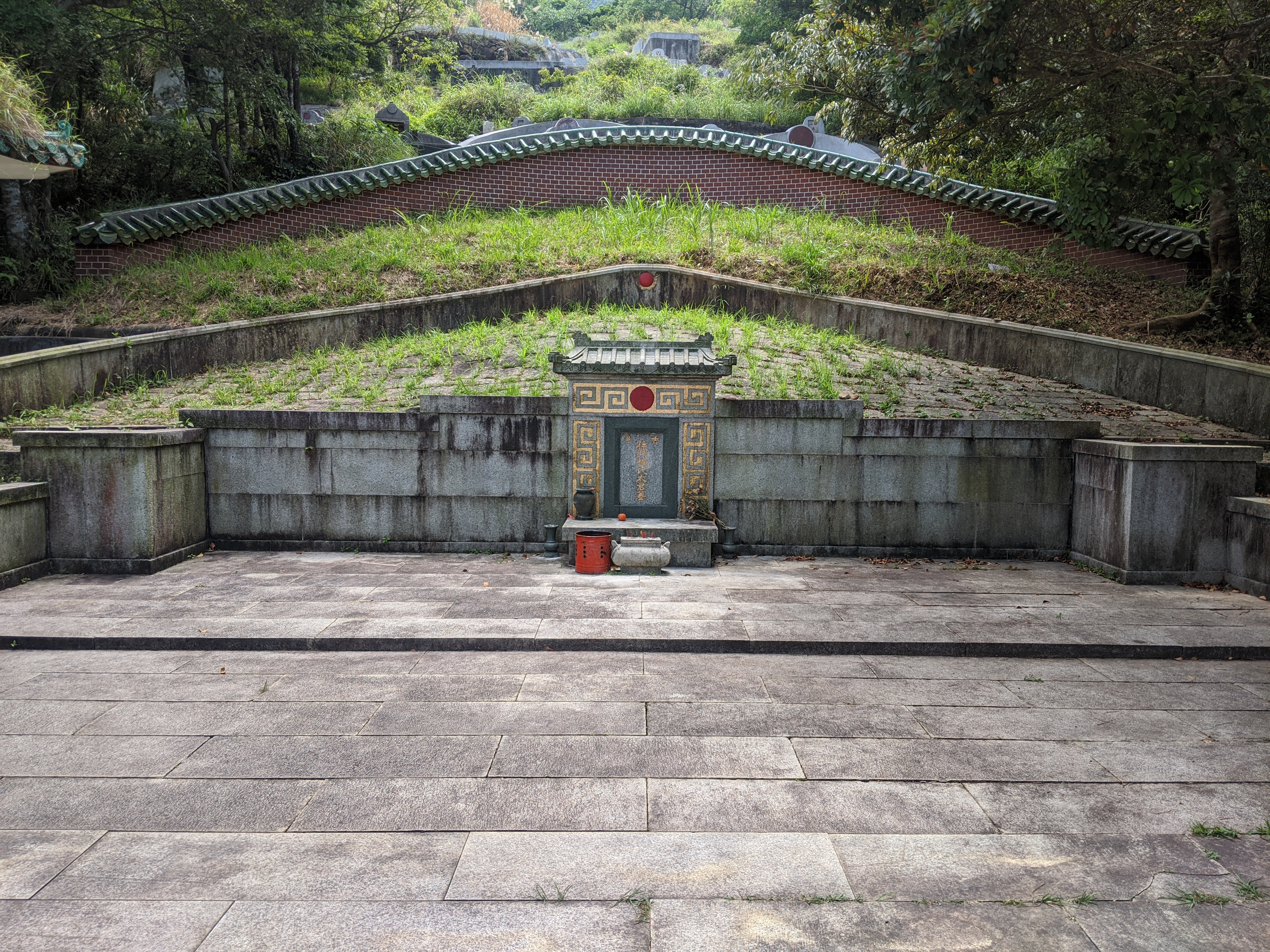
Gravesite

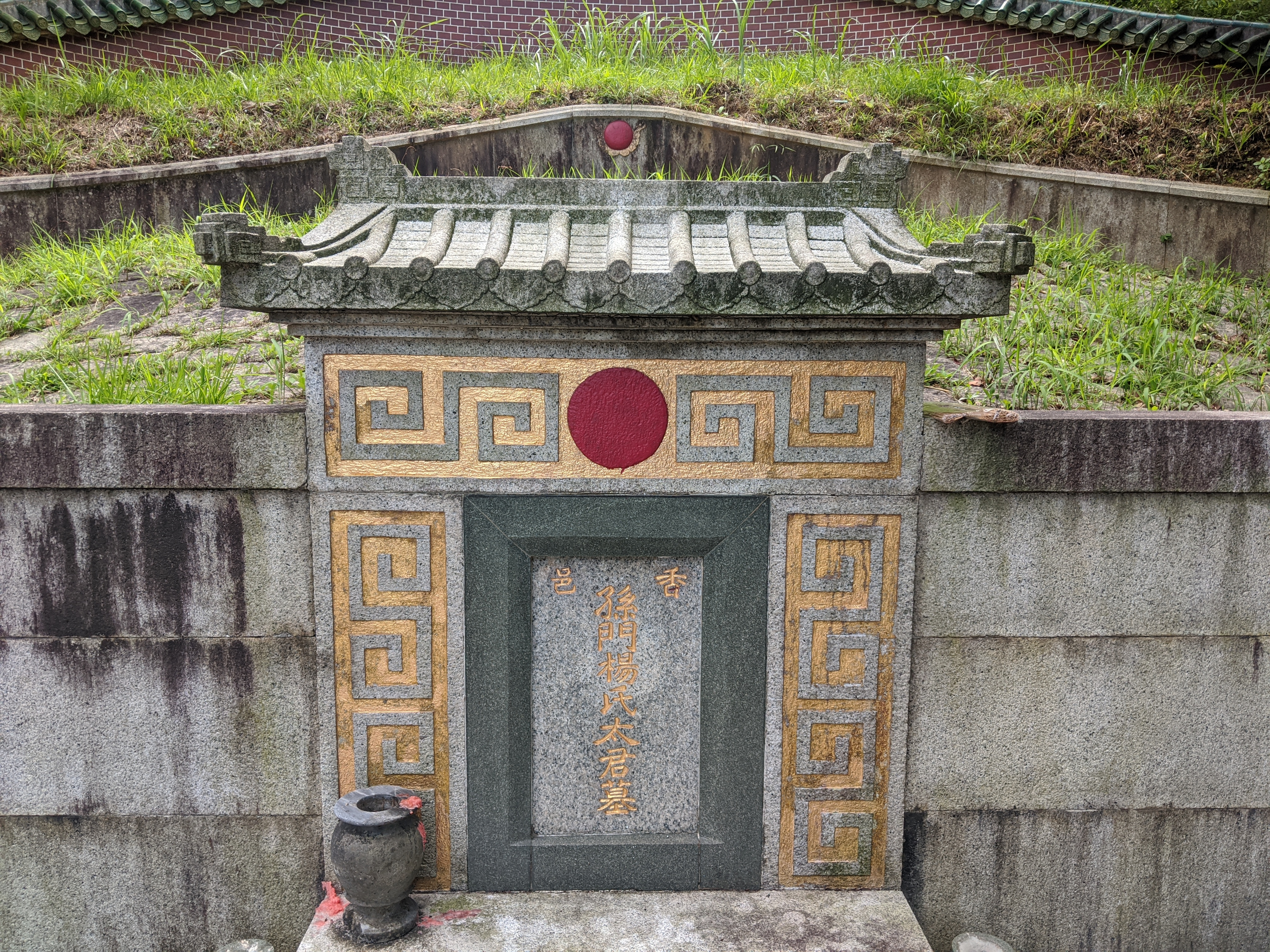
Tomb Inscription

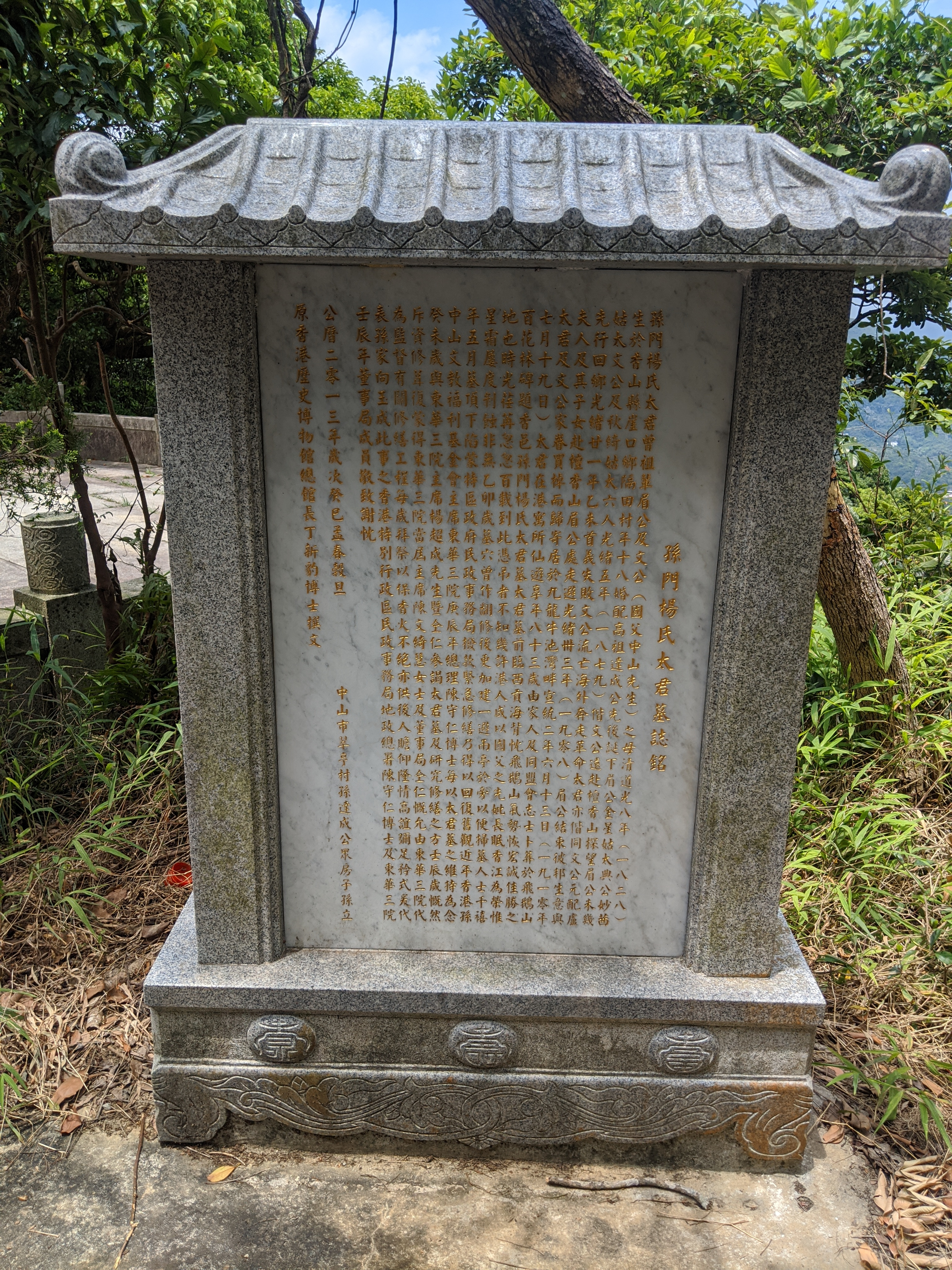
Stone Inscription

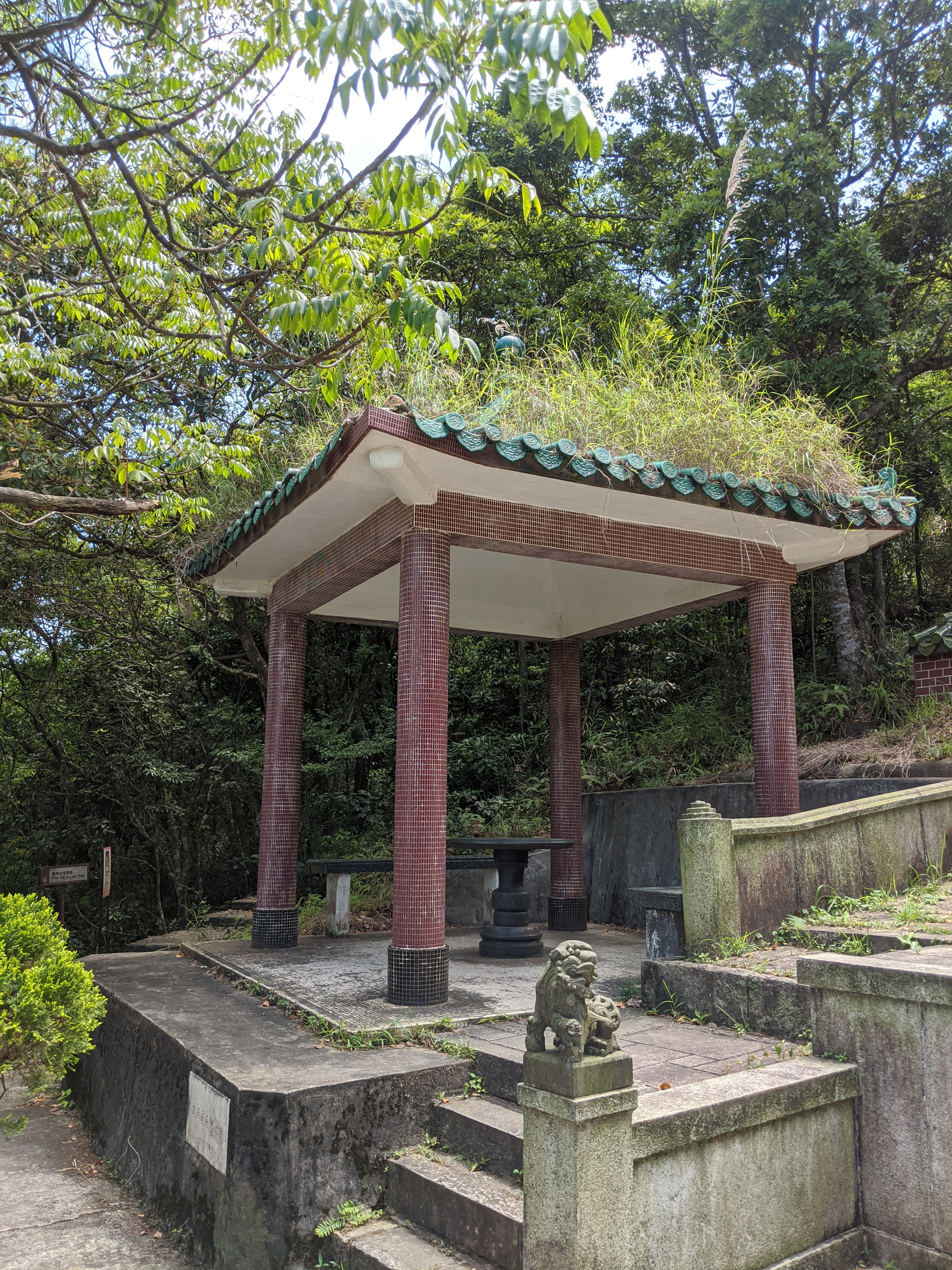
Grave Pavilion

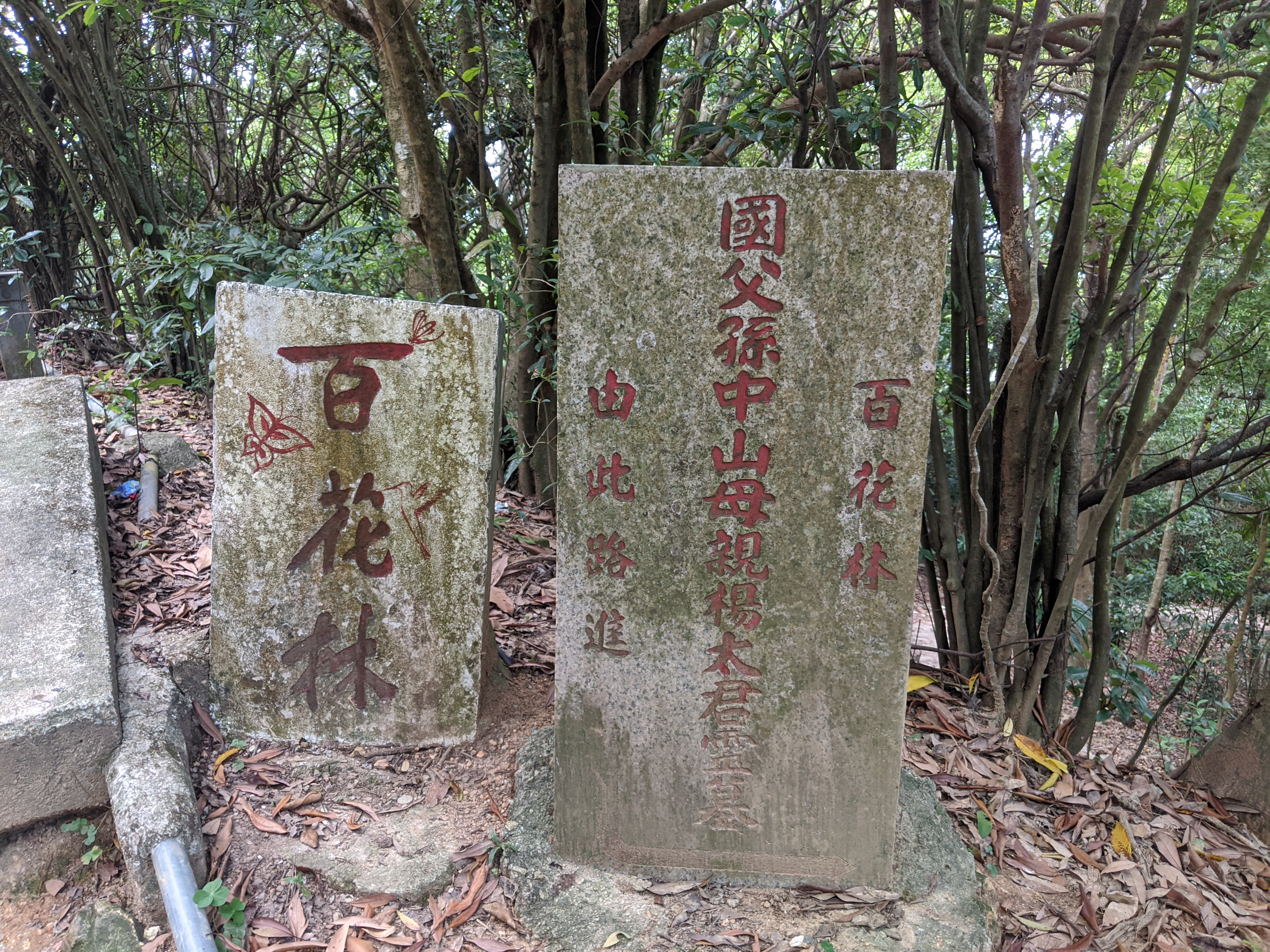
Grave Markers on Fei Ngo Shan road

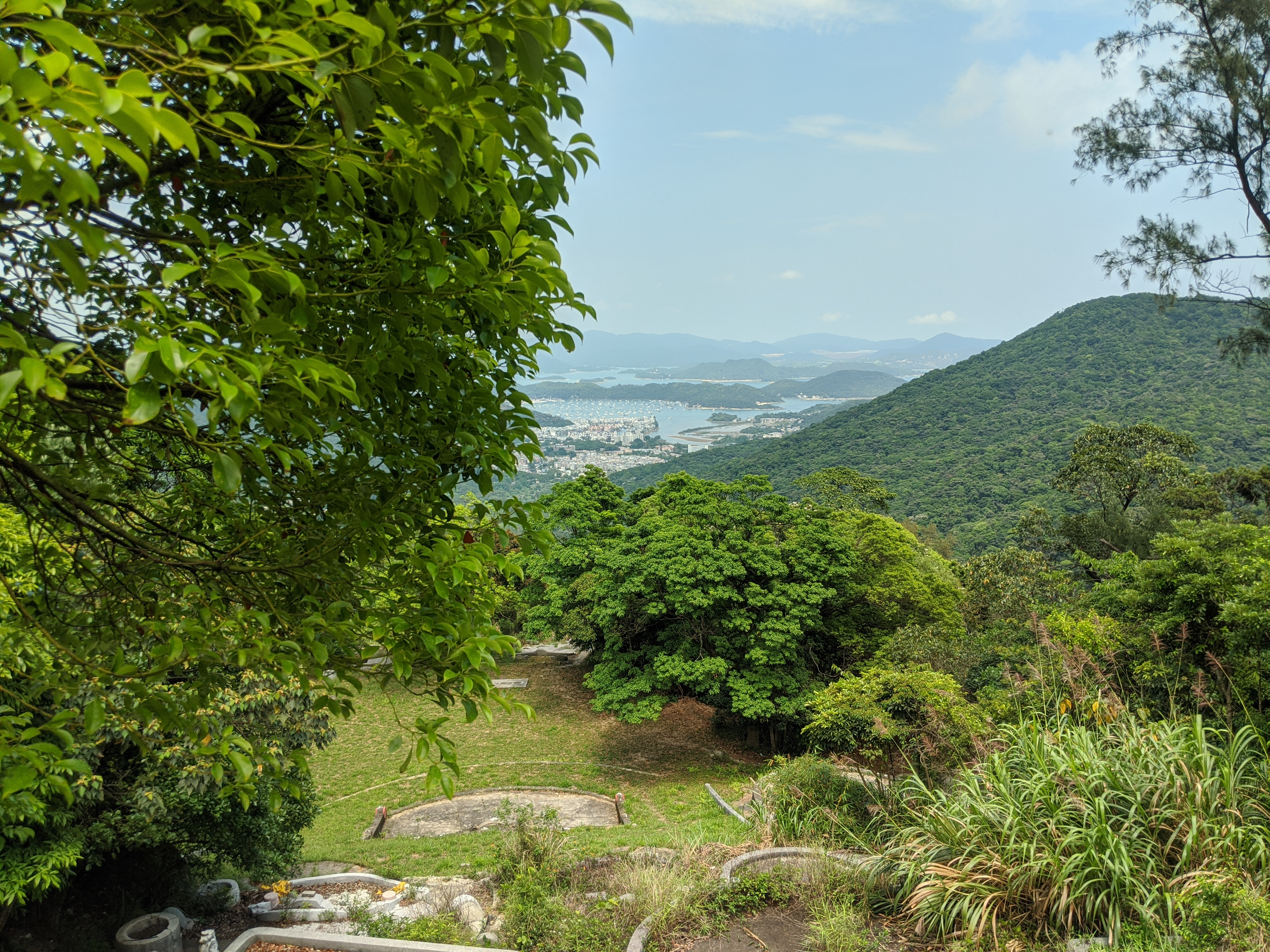
View from the grave

== See also ==
- Red House (Hong Kong)
- Dr Sun Yat-sen Historical Trail
- Dr Sun Yat-sen Museum
- Sun Yat Sen Memorial Park
