= Sun Mei =

Older brother of Sun Yat-Sen (1854–1915)

- 孫眉
- Pronunciation: Sūn Méi
- Born: December 6, 1854; Cuiheng
- Died: February 11, 1915 (aged 60); Macao
- Resting place: Cuiheng
- Other names: 德彰，寿屏
- Relatives: Sun Yat-sen
- Family: Sun Family

Chinese name
- Traditional Chinese: 孫眉
Transcriptions
Standard Mandarin
- Hanyu Pinyin: Sūn Méi

Sun Mei (孫眉 December 6, 1854 – February 11, 1915) was the older brother of Sun Yat-Sen. Sun Mei financed Sun Yat-sen's early education and was an important financial contributor to the 1911 revolution.

== Biography ==
Sun Mei was born into the Sun family on December 6, 1854, as Sun Dezhang (孫德彰). The Sun family was from Cuiheng village. Sun Mei left China for Hawaii in pursuit of economic opportunity in 1871, aged 17.

When Sun first arrived in Hawaii, he worked as a rice merchant. When Sun returned to China to look for a bride, he recruited over a hundred laborers to go with him to Hawaii to work in the sugar cane plantations. Sun later ran the Kahului General Store and became a successful rancher. Between 1879 and 1883, Sun Mei paid for Sun Yat-sen to study at Christian schools Iolani School and Oahu College in Honolulu in order to be able to assist Sun Mei in his business, despite Sun Mei's reservations towards Christianity. After Sun Yat-sen repeatedly insisted on undergoing baptism, Sun Mei feared he was becoming too westernized and sent him back to China to live under the guidance of their father.

Sun Mei at one time held over 100 properties on Oahu and Maui, and was known as "the Maui King". In 1894, Sun Yat-sen returned to Hawaii and started the Revive China Society, which Sun Mei joined. Sun Yat-sen later wrote in his biography that at that time his close friend Deng Yinnan and his brother Sun Mei were "the only two people who helped with all they possessed." Sun Mei sold all his cattle to support the cause. Money raised from overseas Chinese in Hawaii, including Sun Mei, was the main source of funding for the first Canton Uprising in 1894. Sun Mei eventually sold all of his properties and businesses in part to support his brother's revolution, and in part due to pressure caused by the new Hawaii Land Lease Ordinance of 1904. While there is no concrete record of Sun Mei's donations, the amount has been contended to have been around $700,000 total.

In 1907, Sun Mei declared bankruptcy, and left Hawaii. He relocated to Hong Kong and further assisted his brother's revolutionary activities, which led to his expulsion from Hong Kong in 1910. He retired to Macau, where he died on February 11, 1915, from illness.
