= Kaoru Otsuki =

Second wife of Sun Yat-sen (1888–1970)

- 大月 薰
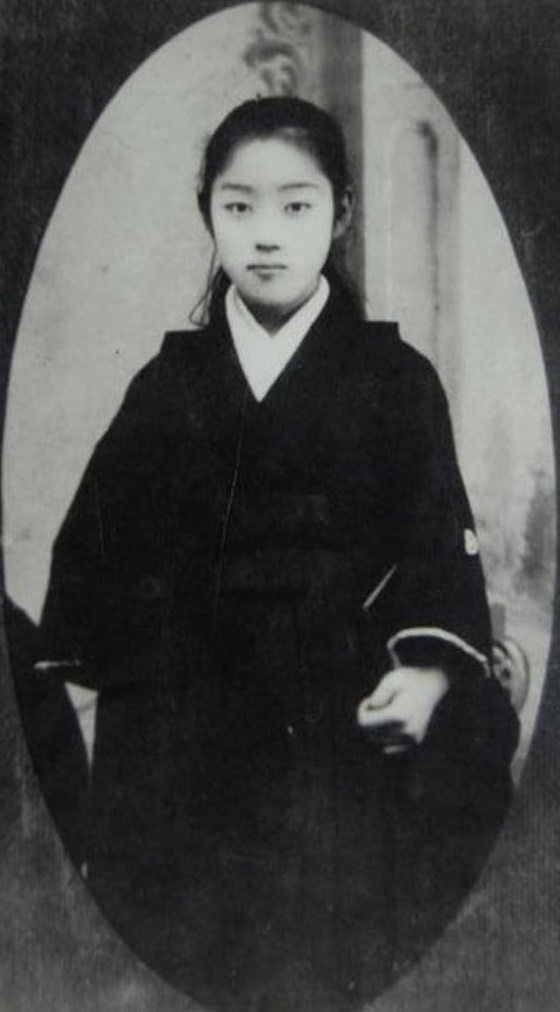
- Otsuki c. 1900
- Born: 6 August 1888; Yokohama, Kanagawa Prefecture, Japan
- Died: 21 December 1970 (aged 82); Tochigi Prefecture, Japan
- Spouses: Sun Yat-sen (m. 1905; abd. 1906) Shūji Miwa (divorced): Motomune Sanekata
- Children: Fumiko Miyagawa (daughter); Motonobu Sanekata (son)

Japanese name
- Kanji: 大月 薰
- Hiragana: おおつき かおる
Transcriptions
- Romanization: Ōtsuki Kaoru

Chinese name
- Chinese: 大月薰
Transcriptions
Standard Mandarin
- Hanyu Pinyin: Dàyuè Xūn
- Wade–Giles: Ta^{4}-yüeh^{4} Hsün^{1}
Yue: Cantonese
- Yale Romanization: Daaih Yuht Fān
- Jyutping: Daai^{6} Jyut^{6} Fan^{1}

Kaoru Otsuki (Japanese: 大月 薰, romanized: Ōtsuki Kaoru; 6 August 1888 – 21 December 1970) was the Japanese second wife of Sun Yat-sen, the founder and first president of the Republic of China. They married when she was 16 years old and he was 38 years old and already married to his first wife.

== Biography ==
Kaoru was born in Yokohama, Kanagawa Prefecture, Japan, on 6 August 1888.

Kaoru first met Sun Yat-sen in Yokohama's Chinatown in 1898, when she knocked over a vase and apologized to Sun. In 1901, Sun asked Kaoru's father for permission to marry his daughter, but Kaoru's father refused because of the great age difference between Sun and Kaoru; at the time, Sun was 37 while Kaoru was only 13. A year later, Sun proposed marriage again and Kaoru's father relented. Kaoru and Sun's wedding ceremony was held in Yokohama in 1905 upon his return to Japan after two years. At the time, Sun was still married to his first wife, Lu Muzhen.

However, Sun left Japan for China before Kaoru gave birth to their daughter, Fumiko, on 12 May 1906; he never returned to see his daughter. Out of financial desperation, Kaoru sent Fumiko to the Miyagawa family for adoption in 1911. Kaoru later remarried twice, first to Shūji Miwa (三輪 秀司), the younger brother of Shizuoka Bank president Shingorō Miwa (三輪 新五郎), and then to Motomune Sanekata (實方 元心), the Buddhist abbot of the Tokoji Temple in Ashikaga, Tochigi. She had a son named Motonobu Sanekata (實方 元信) and a daughter with the latter.

Kaoru was reunited with her daughter Fumiko in 1955, after the latter visited the Tokoji Temple with her eldest son.

Kaoru died on 21 December 1970 at the age of 82. The governments of the People's Republic of China (mainland China) and the Republic of China (Taiwan) have both acknowledged Kaoru's marriage to Sun Yat-sen, and their grandson by Fumiko, Touichi Miyagawa, was invited to the centennial celebrations of the Xinhai Revolution in Wuhan, China, in 2011.
