= Yuhei Otsuki =

Japanese footballer

Personal information
- Full name: Yuhei Otsuki
- Date of birth: 6 May 1988 (age 38)
- Place of birth: Fukuchiyama, Kyoto, Japan
- Height: 1.71 m (5 ft 7 in)
- Position: Midfielder

Youth career
- 2004–2006: Kyoto Sanga Youth
- 2007–2011: Tokoha University SC

Senior career*
Years	Team	Apps	(Gls)
2012–2017	Zweigen Kanazawa	124	(3)
- * Club domestic league appearances and goals as of 2 February 2018

Yuhei Otsuki (大槻 優平, Otsuki Yuhei; born 6 May 1988) is a former Japanese footballer who played for Zweigen Kanazawa.

== Career statistics ==
Updated to 2 February 2018.

Appearances and goals by club, season and competition
Club	Season	League			Emperor's Cup		Total	
Club	Season	Division	Apps	Goals	Apps	Goals	Apps	Goals
Zweigen Kanazawa	2012	JFL	27	1	1	0	28	1
Zweigen Kanazawa	2013	JFL	31	0	3	1	34	1
Zweigen Kanazawa	2014	J2 League	0	0	1	0	1	0
Zweigen Kanazawa	2015	J2 League	31	1	2	1	33	2
Zweigen Kanazawa	2016	J2 League	16	0	2	0	18	0
Zweigen Kanazawa	2017	J2 League	19	1	0	0	19	1
Career total			124	3	9	2	133	5
