= Holy Ecclesia of Jesus =

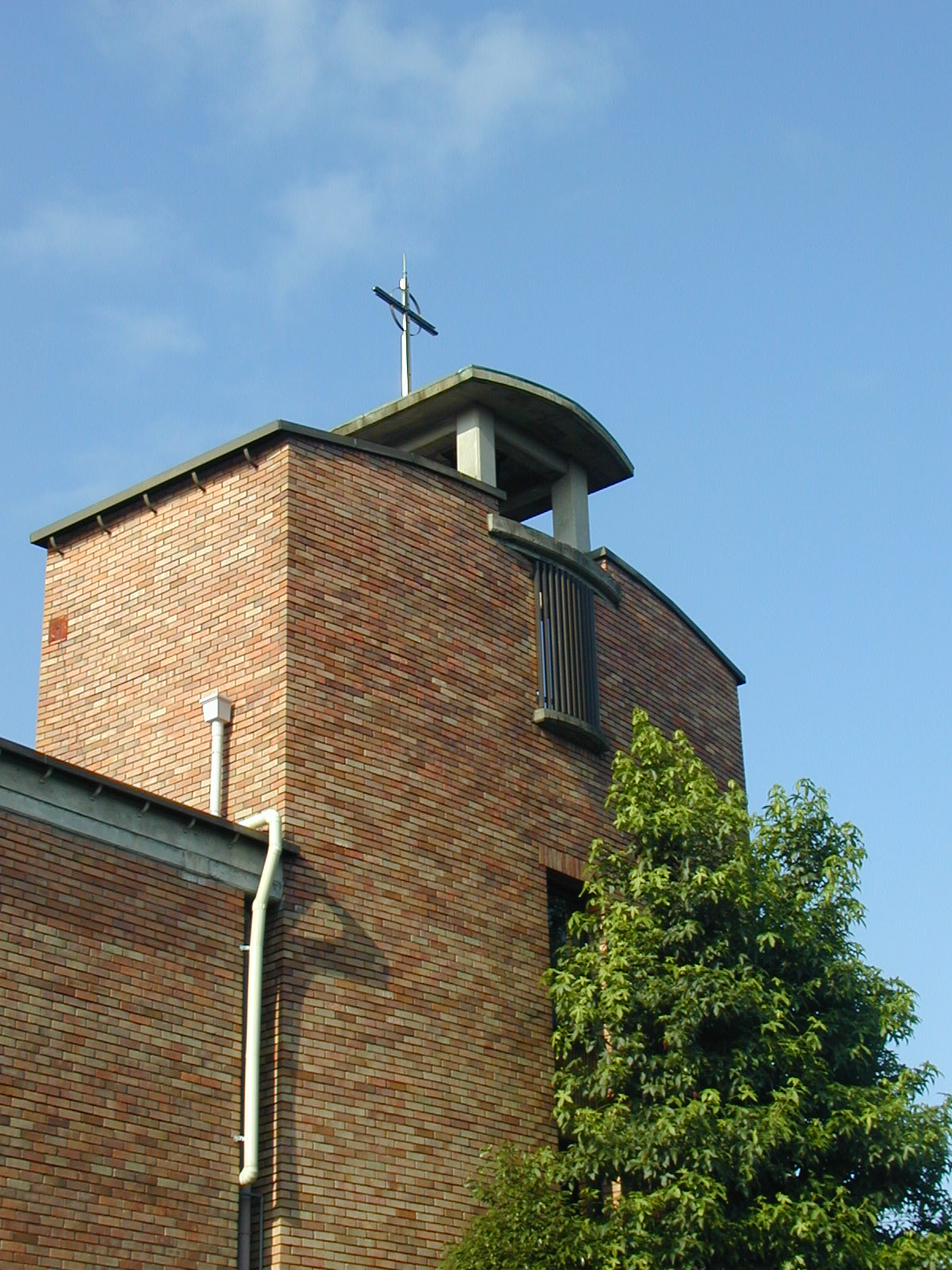

The Holy Ecclesia of Jesus also known as the Congregation of Jesus (聖イエス会, Sei Iesu Kai) is an independent Japanese Christian denomination founded by Ōtsuki Takeji (大槻武二) in 1946. It is the third largest of the Japanese-founded churches. The Holy Ecclesia of Jesus is a movement aimed at recovering apostolic Christianity and entrusted with a special mission regarding the nation of Israel in these "last days." Ōtsuki writes that its authentic mission is not to transmit the doctrine or theology of Christianity, but to manifest the living Christ in our lives. As of 2007, the movement had approximately 5,000 members throughout Japan.

== History ==
Ōtsuki was born in Ayabe City in 1906, and as a young man converted to Christianity while a student at Dōshisha Middle school, a private mission school in Kyoto. Ōtsuki was attracted to the faith through the evangelistic preaching of Kanamori Michinori during the daily chapel program and went on to receive baptism. Dissatisfied with Dōshisha's "liberal and socialistic" form of Christianity, Ōtsuki found his way into the Holiness Church in 1930. Ōtsuki completed his theological training at the Holiness Bible Seminary in Tokyo and engaged in evangelistic work in several locations around Japan before accepting appointment as a missionary to Manchuria in 1936.

In 1938, while he was serving as a Holiness missionary in Mukden, Manchuria, Ōtsuki had a "direct encounter with the living Christ," which was a life-transforming experience that was to become the foundation of his independent ministry. Ōtsuki also recorded specific revelations regarding the salvation of Israel and his future role in the fulfillment of the Bible's apocalyptic vision.

A charismatic leader, Father Ōtsuki is also said to have performed fantastical miracles while he served in Manchuria. According to Reverend Yamanaka, "When Father Ōtsuki prayed, the twisted spine of a hunchback was straightened. That was the beginning of the miracles. After that, people who couldn't speak, people who couldn't stand up on their own legs—many people were cured." When asked about the supposed miracles, Father Ōtsuki Takeji's son, Ōtsuki Masaru, said that he saw them with his own eyes: "There was never any doubt."

After returning to Japan in 1942, Ōtsuki Takeji engaged in evangelistic work and led revival meetings in various locations around Japan. In 1946 he received another revelation from the Lord in which he was instructed to establish an independent church to be named the Holy Ecclesia of Jesus. The mission of the church was to recover and spread the Apostolic faith in place of the Westernized version of Christianity that missionaries had planted in Japan. The motto of the church today emphasizes this concern to recover the apostolic faith:

キリスト者はキリストのごとく, 教会は使徒行伝のごとく
Christians are called to be like Christ,
and the church to be like the Acts of the Apostles.

Obedient to these divine instructions, Ōtsuki left the Holiness Church with a small group of disciples and organized the Holy Ecclesia of Jesus. After a brief period based in Fukuyama City, Hiroshima Prefecture, Ōtsuki moved the headquarters of the movement to Kyoto in 1949. This has been the organizational center for a nationwide evangelistic ministry, which has grown to include over hundred churches scattered across the country from Okinawa in the south to Hokkaidō in the north.

== Eschatology and Zionist Orientation ==
Ōtsuki's concern for the nation of Israel clearly reflects the views of Nakada Jūji, his mentor in the Japan Holiness Church, whose theology was dominated in his later years by eschatological concerns and the idea that Japan was somehow connected to the salvation of Israel. Without denying this influence, Ōtsuki claims that he also received a special revelation concerning the movement's responsibilities toward Israel while he was a missionary in China. He reports that the Lord instructed him:

1. To pray for the restoration of the nation of Israel;
2. To pray for the spiritual renewal of Israel, which is the condition for the return of Christ;
3. To pray for the peace of Jerusalem, which is the key to the peace of the world; and
4. To pray for the coming of the Messiah of Peace.

Ten years after Ōtsuki received this revelation and began praying fervently for the restoration of Israel, the nation of Israel was established as an independent state. This provided important confirmation for Ōtsuki and his followers at an early stage of this movement's development. This apocalyptic consciousness and the concern for the nation of Israel pervades all aspects of this movement today.

In 1946, Father Ōtsuki Takeji founded Beit Shalom (also known as Japan Christian Friends of Israel), according to what he said were the instructions of God. At the time, he had not met a Jew in his life; indeed, he had to wait until 1962 before he would ever meet an Israeli. Beit Shalom was created as a guest house for Israeli and Jewish visitors to Japan, where they could stay for free for up to three nights. Beit Shalom also holds concerts in the visitors' honor, presented by the Shachar Choir (Dawn Choir) composed of native Japanese members of the Sei Iesu Kai congregation. The choir sings songs in Hebrew for Israeli guests in order to "express the love of Israel and to promote friendship between Israel and Japan." Beit Shalom also created and runs the Holocaust Education Center in Fukuyama, near Hiroshima. Many members of the Sei Iesu Kai clergy have studied in Israel and speak Hebrew, and Father Ōtsuki himself received the Honorary Fellow of Hebrew University in Jerusalem in 1994.
