= Ōtsuki Takeji =

Ōtsuki Takeji (Japanese: 大槻武二; 1906–2004) was the founder of the third largest independent Japanese church, known as the Holy Ecclesia of Jesus (or Sei Iesu Kai, 聖イエス会). Ōtsuki was born in Ayabe City in 1906, and as a young man converted to Christianity while a student at Dōshisha Middle school, a private mission school in Kyoto. Ōtsuki was attracted to the faith through the evangelistic preaching of Kanamori Michinori during the daily chapel program and went on to receive baptism. Dissatisfied with Dōshisha's "liberal and socialistic" form of Christianity, Ōtsuki found his way into the Japan Holiness Church in 1930. Ōtsuki completed his theological training at the Holiness Bible Seminary in Tokyo and engaged in evangelistic work in several locations around Japan before accepting appointment as a missionary to Manchuria in 1936.

It was while serving as a Holiness missionary in Manchuria that Ōtsuki had a "direct encounter with the living Christ," life-transforming experience that was to become the foundation of his independent ministry. While praying in preparation for the New Year Convention (the first Seikai 聖会 or revival meeting of the year) and asking God to send him a guiding motto, he was presented with the words of Jesus from there Sermon on the Mount, "Blessed are the pure of heart for they shall see God." Ōtsuki explains that his belief in God was beyond question, even though he had never seen God.

== Revelation ==
In his own congregation in Manchuria, however, an eight-year-old girl named Shigetoshi Kiyoko testified in December 1937 that she saw God. Her piety was noted by the clergy because her father had thrown her out of the house due to her insistent desire to attend Sunday school; he was a policeman during a time of very high tension with America, and Christianity was viewed as an American religion. As the story goes, Kiyoko had been a premature baby, and her legs were crippled. Cast out of her home into the December cold of Manchuria, she became very ill and prayed fervently, at which point she received the vision from God and proceeded to die peacefully. Inspired by the faith of this young girl, Ōtsuki asked God to purify his heart so that he might have the same experience.

His prayer was answered on the evening of 9 January 1938. As Ōtsuki recounts, he lost all consciousness of himself and his surroundings and was confronted by the living Christ. He felt the "breath of God blowing on him" and saw a bright and beautiful light coming toward him until it entered his body. In seeking to make sense of the experience, Ōtsuki searched the scriptures and discovered that the Hebrew prophets and the Apostles had reported similarly moving experiences.

As a result, Ōtsuki came to understand what the Apostle Paul meant when he wrote, "It is no longer I who live, but Christ who lives in me" (Galatians 2:20). he saw that as individuals and as the church, we now form the body of Christ on earth, our bodies being the temple and dwelling place of the living Christ (2 Cor. 6:16). Ōtsuki believed that the early apostles did not merely preach Christ, but through the laying on of hands passed the living Christ to others. Through this same indwelling power Ōtsuki's life was transformed and healing became an increasingly important part of his ministry (the church reports that over eight thousand individuals were healed during Ōtsuki's missionary work in China). On the same evening that his personal life transformation occurred, Ōtsuki also recorded specific revelations regarding the salvation of Israel and his future role in the fulfillment of the Bible's apocalyptic vision.

A charismatic leader, Father Ōtsuki is also said to have performed fantastical miracles while he served in Manchuria. According to Reverend Yamanaka, "When Father Ōtsuki prayed, the twisted spine of a hunchback was straightened. That was the beginning of the miracles. After that, people who couldn’t speak, people who couldn’t stand up on their own legs—many people were cured." When asked about the supposed miracles, Father Ōtsuki Takeji's son, Ōtsuki Masaru, said that he saw them with his own eyes: "There was never any doubt."

== Formation of Sei Iesu Kai ==
After returning to Japan in 1942, Ōtsuki engaged in evangelistic work and led revival meetings in various locations around Japan. In 1946 he received another revelation from the Lord in which he was instructed to establish an independent church to be named the Holy Ecclesia of Jesus. The mission of the church was to recover and spread the Apostolic faith in place of the Westernized version of Christianity that missionaries had planted in Japan.

Obedient to these divine instructions, Ōtsuki left the Japan Holiness Church with a small group of disciples and organized the Holy Ecclesia of Jesus. After a brief period based in Fukuyama City, Hiroshima Prefecture, Ōtsuki moved the headquarters of the movement to Kyoto in 1949. This has been the organizational center for a nationwide evangelistic ministry, which has grown to include over hundred churches scattered across the country from Okinawa in the south to Hokkaidō in the north.

In later years, Father Ōtsuki learned to speak Hebrew and even received the Honorary Fellow of Hebrew University in Jerusalem in 1994.
