= Lu Muzhen =

First wife of Sun Yat-sen (1867–1952)

- 盧慕貞
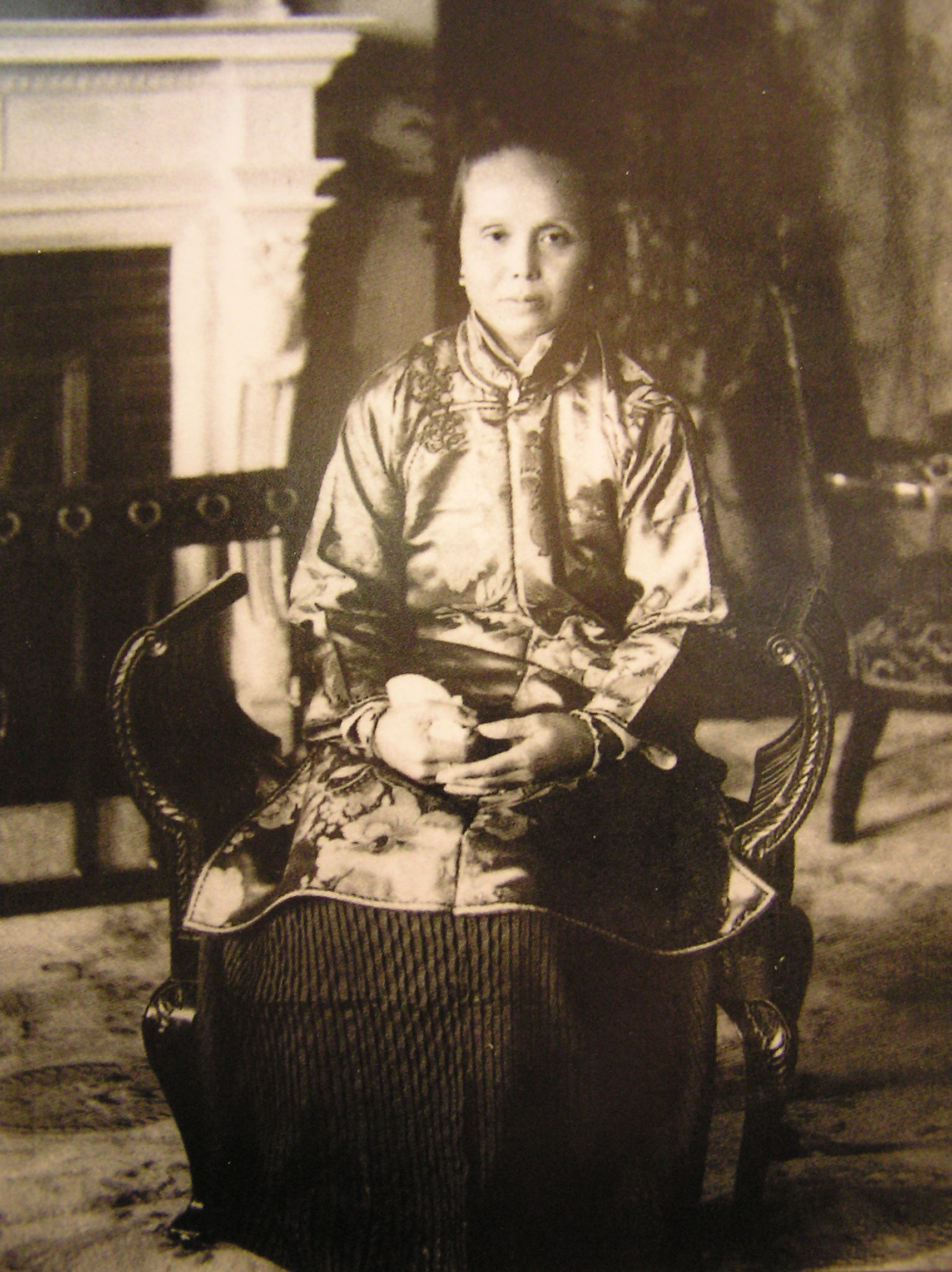

First Lady of the Republic of China
- In role 1 January 1912 – 1 April 1912
- President: Sun Yat-sen
- Succeeded by: Yu Yishang

Personal details
- Born: 30 July 1867 Xiangshan County, Guangdong, Qing dynasty
- Died: 7 September 1952 (aged 85) Portuguese Macau
- Spouse: Sun Yat-sen (m. 1885; div. 1915)
- Children: Sun Fo; Sun Yan; Sun Wan

Chinese name
- Traditional Chinese: 盧慕貞
- Simplified Chinese: 卢慕贞
Transcriptions
Standard Mandarin
- Hanyu Pinyin: Lú Mùzhēn
- Wade–Giles: Lu^{2} Mu^{4}-chen^{1}

Lu Muzhen (30 July 1867 – 7 September 1952) was the first wife of Chinese revolutionary Sun Yat-sen. A traditional Chinese housewife, she had two daughters, Wan and Yan, and one son, Fo, with her husband. Sun divorced her after 30 years of marriage, in order to marry Soong Ching-ling in 1915. Since their divorce, Lu began living in Portuguese Macau until her death in 1952.

== Early life ==
Lu Muzhen was born on 30 July 1867 into a wealthy family in Waibo Village, Xiangshan County, Guangdong, China. Her father, Lu Yaoxian, was a successful businessman in Honolulu, Hawaii. Raised as a traditional Chinese woman, Lu Muzhen had bound feet, excelled in needlework, and upheld strong filial piety. She married Sun Yat-sen on 26 May 1885, under the arrangement of their parents. Initially, Sun was displeased with the arrangement but changed his view in 1888 when Lu devotedly cared for his gravely ill father. This act of kindness moved Sun, and the couple grew closer, eventually having one son and two daughters.

During Sun Yat-sen's revolutionary pursuits, Lu Muzhen remained in China to care for their parents and children. In November 1895, after the Guangzhou Uprising plot was uncovered by the Qing government, Sun's family faced political persecution. Lu Muzhen took their children and Sun's mother, Madame Yang, to Honolulu to seek refuge with her brother-in-law, Sun Mei. When Sun Mei declared bankruptcy due to his financial support of the revolution, the family relocated to Ngau Chi Wan in Kowloon, Hong Kong. Sun Fo was left alone in Honolulu to continue his study.

On 19 July 1910, the mother of Sun Yat-sen, Madame Yang, died in Hong Kong. In August 1910, Sun began planning the Second Guangzhou Uprising in Penang, Malaya. Lu Muzhen brought their two daughters to join him in Penang. However, three months later, Sun was expelled by the local authorities, leaving Lu and the children behind. Struggling without an income, they relied on donations from overseas Chinese communities to survive.

== First Lady ==
After the 1911 Revolution, Sun Yat-sen was elected the Provisional President of the new Chinese republic in early 1912. Lu Muzhen travelled from Penang to Shanghai and Nanjing, hoping to reunite with Sun Yat-sen. She was warmly received during her journey and honoured as the "Mother of the Nation." However, Sun Yat-sen's political commitments left little time for their family life.

Lu left Sun and their daughters in Nanjing and returned to their hometown in Cuiheng. In May, Sun returned to Cuiheng, after which the couple toured Guangzhou and Beijing. Starting from 1912, Lu settled in Macau alongside Chen Cuifen, Sun's concubine. In June 1913, Sun visited Macau to see their ailing daughter, Sun Wan.

In 1913, Sun Yat-sen left for Japan to inspect railway construction, and Lu followed and met him in March. After Sun began plotting a new revolution against Yuan Shikai, Lu left him and returned to Macau. She became a Christian in Honolulu, Hawaii on 14 April 1915.

== Divorce ==
Sun Yat-sen fell in love with Soong Ching-ling during their stay in Japan. Soong was born to a prestigious family, so she did not agree to be a mistress only. Therefore, Sun wrote to Lu, requesting her permission to divorce. Most people disagreed with Sun's marriage with Soong Ching-ling. However, Lu agreed and remarked,

My husband has been constantly travelling both at home and abroad for the revolution, living a life of uncertainty. If there is someone who is willing to take good care of him, I am willing to support that person and am therefore willing to divorce him.

In late 1915, Lu left Macau for Tokyo to discuss divorce with Sun. She believed that she as a foot-bound, illiterate woman was far less capable than Soong Ching-ling, who had been college-educated. Therefore she agreed to end their 32-year marriage.

== After divorce ==
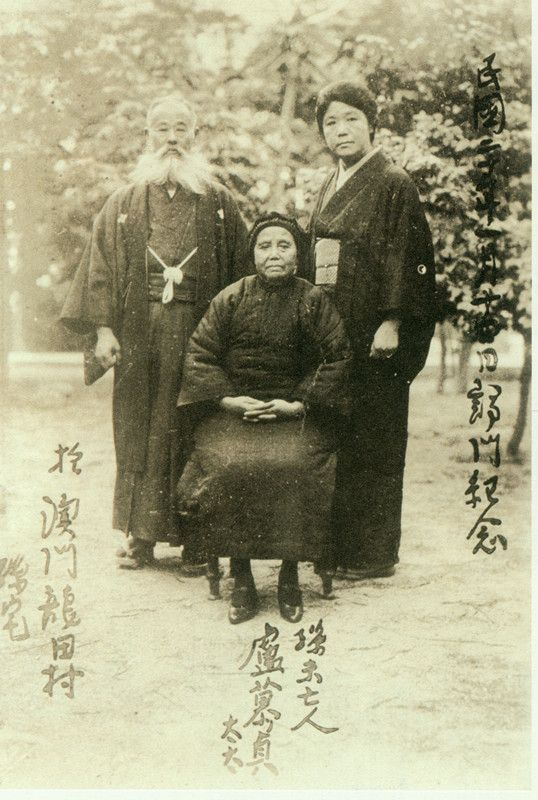
Lu Muzhen (middle) with Sun Yat-sen's Japanese friends in 1931

After the divorce, she returned to Macau via Penang and lived in Macau ever since. When Sun Yat-sen died in 1925, although she was not invited to the official funeral, she mourned him with traditional Chinese funeral services at her home. In August 1930, her residence suffered from an arsenal explosion, for which the Macau government made compensation. Sun Fo thus rebuilt the residence for his mother.

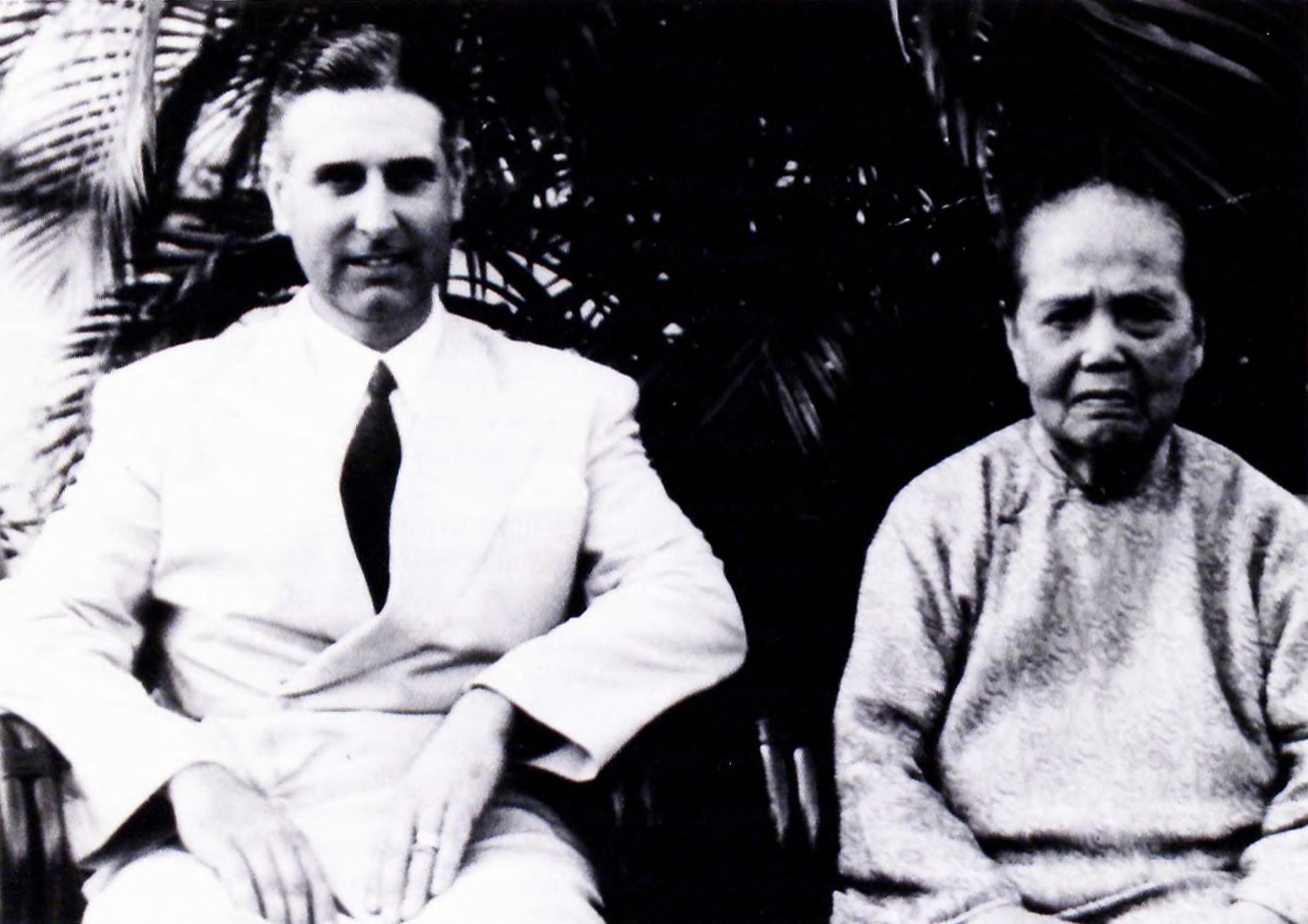
Lu Muzhen with Governor Albano de Oliveira, September 1947

She died in Macau on 7 September 1952.

== Memorial ==
After her death, her residence was first handed over to the Macau Post and then the Mainland Affairs Council of Taiwan and is currently managed by the Taipei Economic and Cultural Office in Macau as the Sun Yat Sen Memorial House.

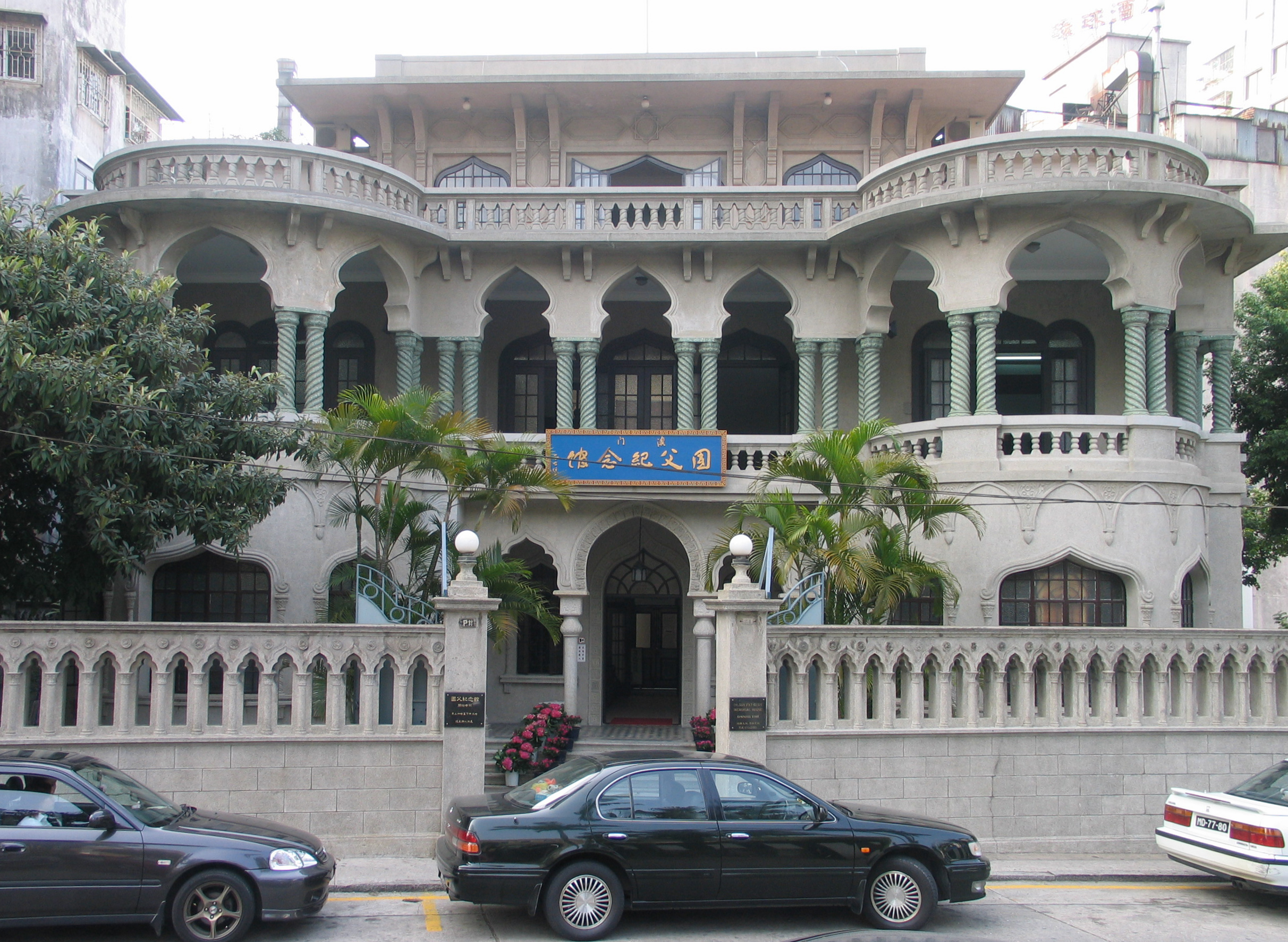
Sun Yat Sen Memorial House in Macau. This house was once the home of Lu Muzhen.
