= Cuiheng =

Cuiheng 翠亨新区
- New Area
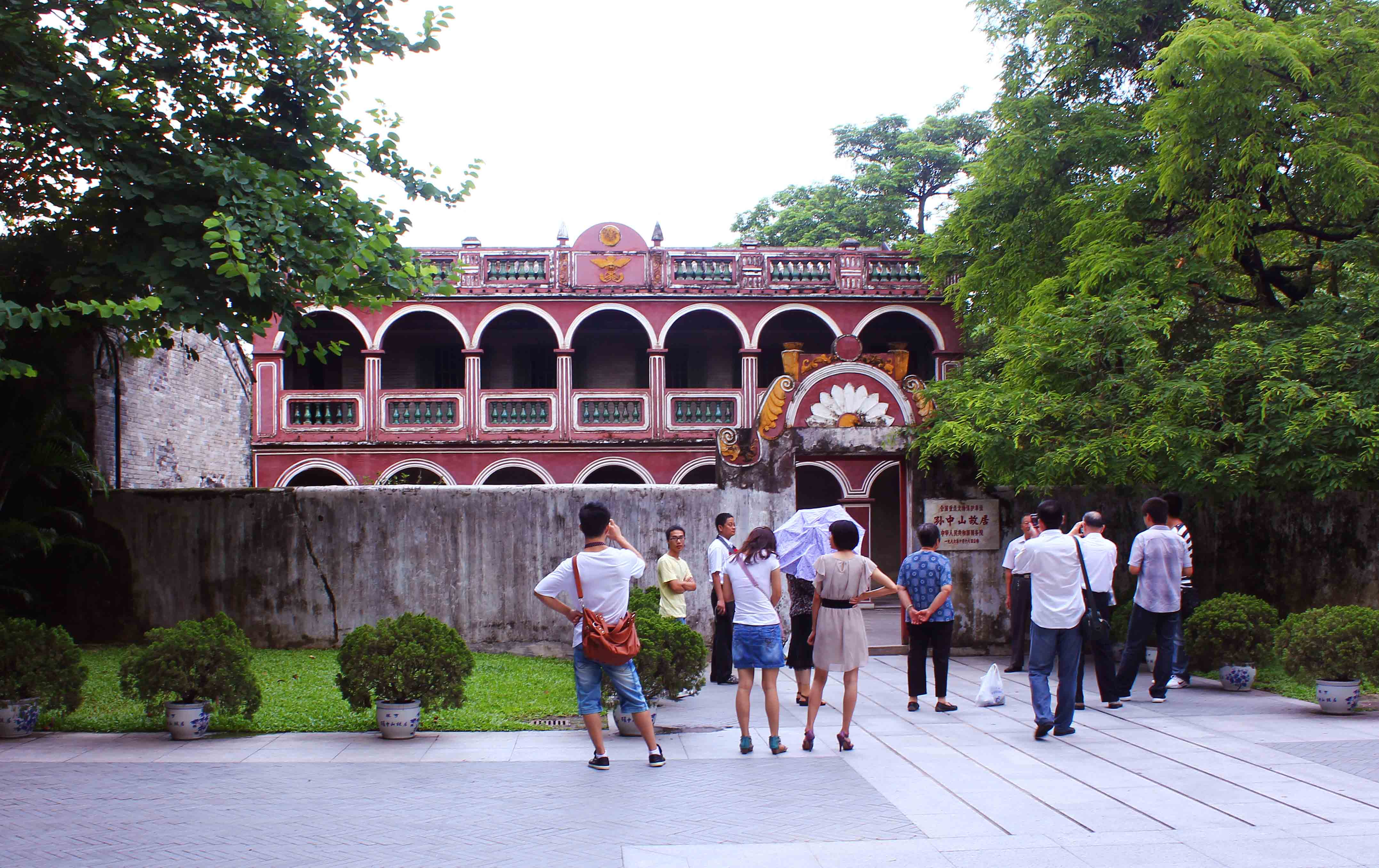
- Former residence of Dr. Sun Yat-sen in Cuiheng

- Location in Guangdong
- Coordinates: 22°26′40.80″N 113°32′12.25″E
- Country: People's Republic of China
- Province: Guangdong
- Prefecture-level city: Zhongshan
- Town: Nanlang
- Elevation: 2.7 m (8.9 ft)
- Time zone: UTC+8 (China Standard)
- Area code: 0760

Cuiheng (Chinese: 翠亨村; pinyin: Cuìhēngcūn; Jyutping: ceoi3 hang1 cyun1) is a village of the town of Nanlang, Zhongshan, Guangdong province. Cuiheng is best known as the birthplace of Dr. Sun Yat-sen, the "Father of the Nation" of the Republic of China. Cuiheng is 17.6 kilometres (10.9 mi) southeast of downtown Zhongshan, and 26 km (16 mi) north of Macau. The whole village is designated a special economic district, as Cuiheng New Area.

== History ==
The village was established in the latter half of the 17th century by the Feng and Mai families, who were later joined by the Yang and Lu (陸) families. The Lu surname became most numerous. At the time of Sun Yat-sen's birth in the 1860s, there were about sixty households with ten surnames. In addition to Sun, Lu Muzhen, Sun's first wife and Lu Haodong (1868–1895), an early revolutionary martyr, were also born in Cuiheng.

== Administration ==
Cuiheng is administered by Nanlang Township. For a time, Cuiheng village was elevated to the township level and became the town of Cuiheng Village (翠亨村镇). However, in 1998 it was downgraded and reintegrated inside the town of Nanlang. On 31 March 2013 Cuiheng was upgraded into a "New Area".

== Tourism ==
Cuiheng is home to the Former Residence of Dr Sun Yat-sen (孙中山故居) and the Sun Yat-sen Residence Memorial Museum (孙中山故居纪念馆), which was built next to the residence in 1956. The residence and museum complex was classified as a Major Site Protected at the National Level of China in 1986 by the State Council of China. There is also a Polaris Temple (北极殿) dedicated to the Polaris Emperor (北极帝君).

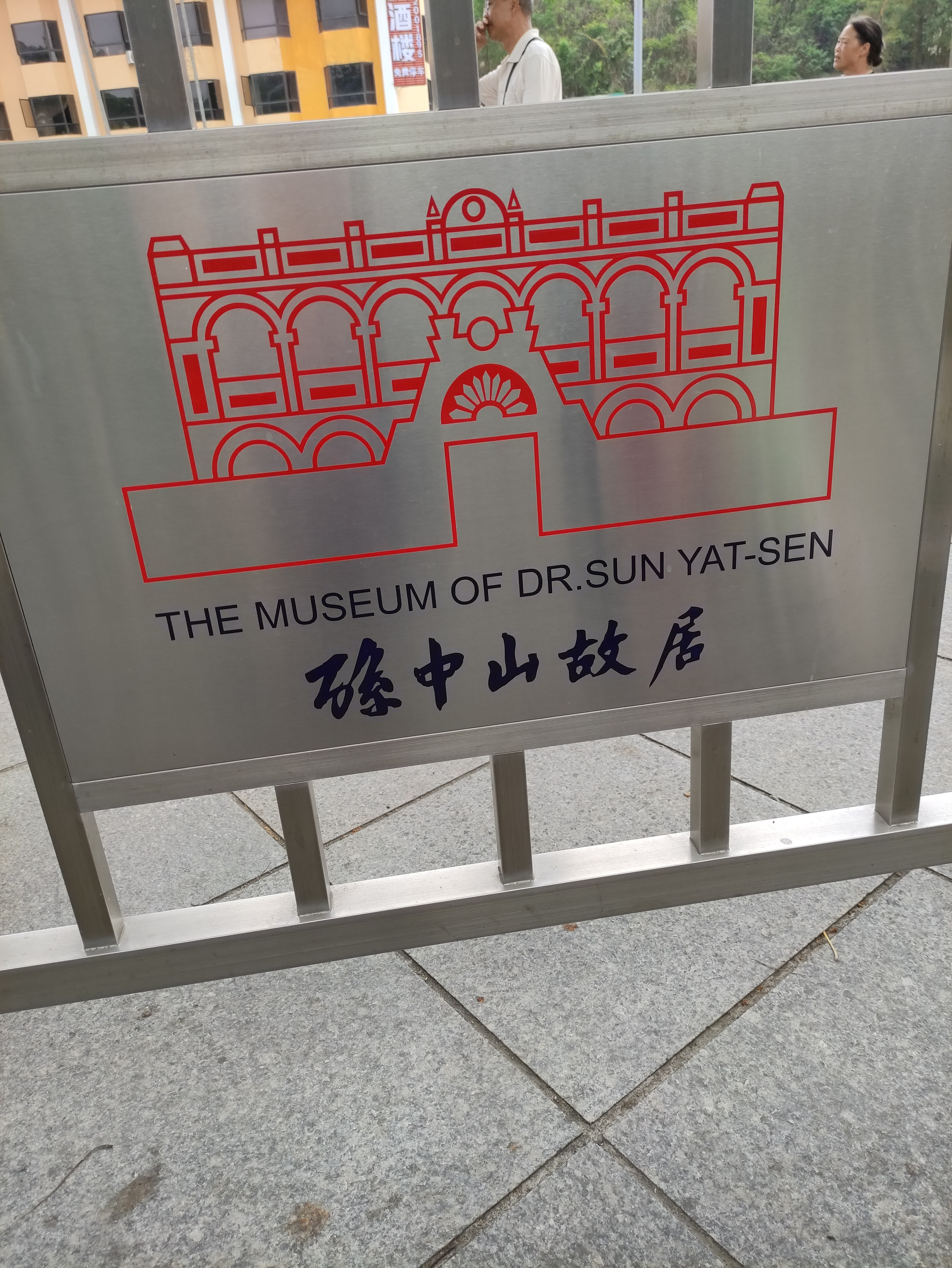
Plaque at the Museum of Dr. Sun Yat Sen, Zhongshan

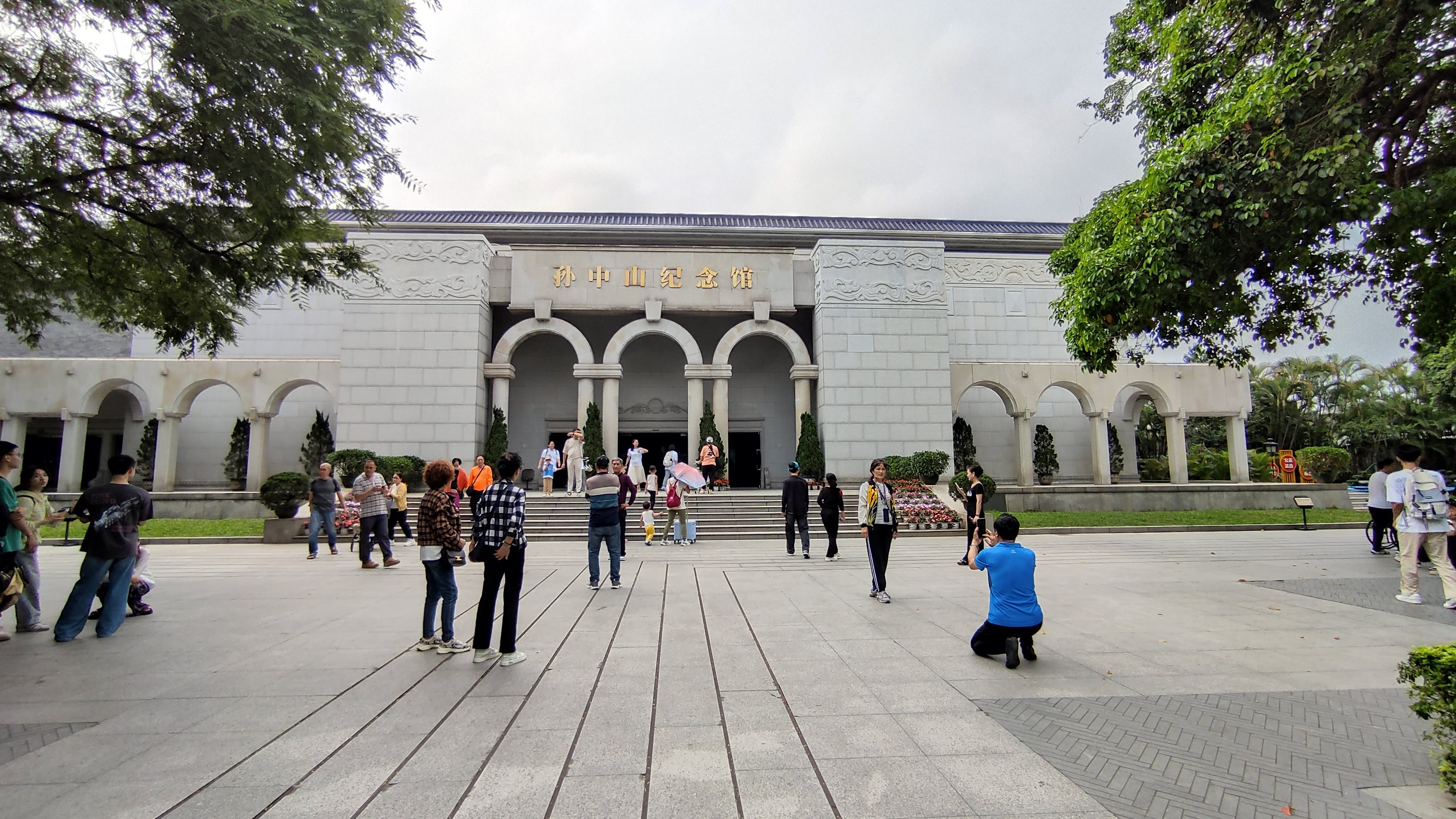
Memorial Museum of Sun Yat-sen, Zhongshan

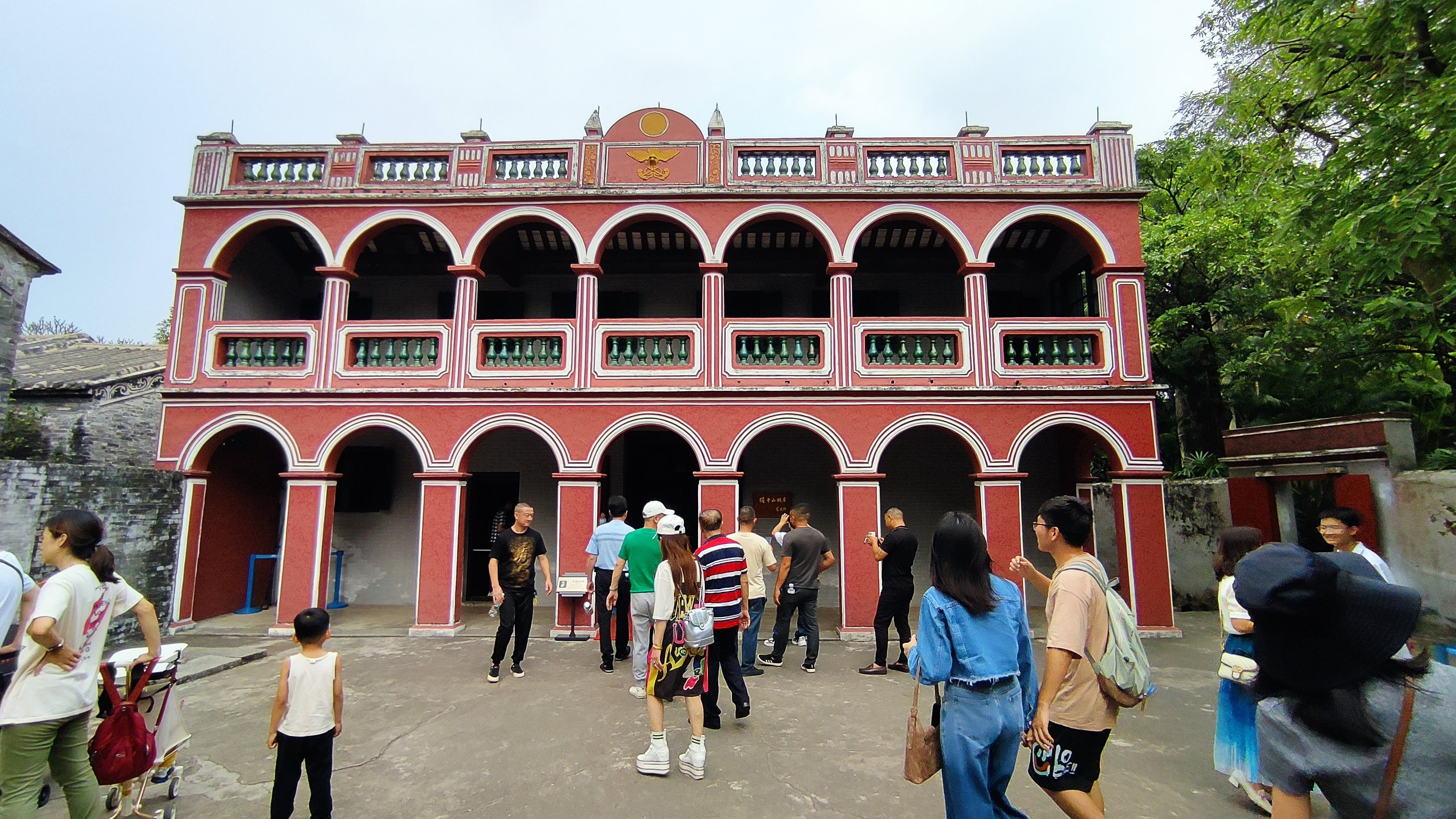
Ancestral Home of Sun Yat-sen, Zhongshan

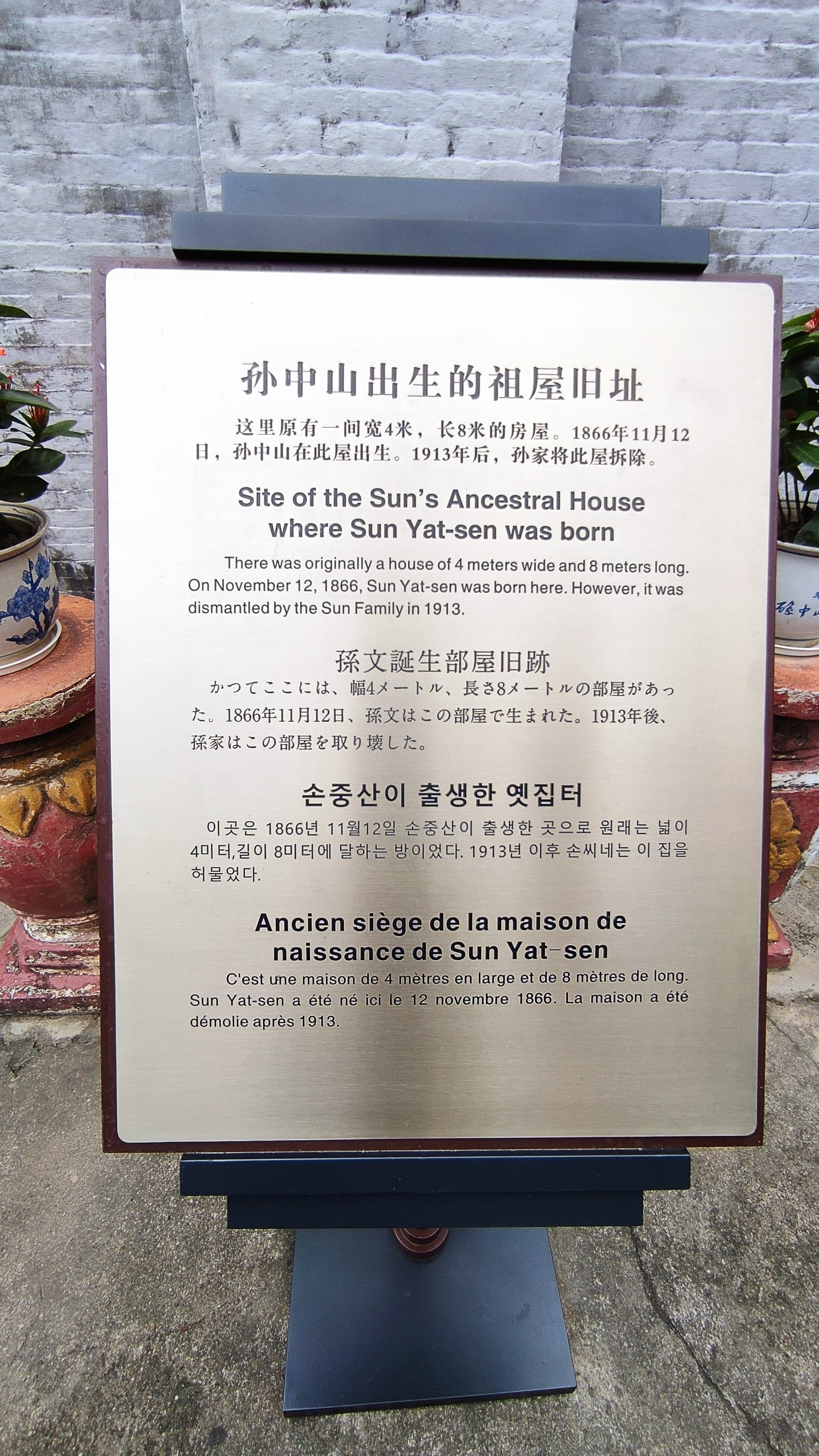
Plaque in front of Sun Yat-sen's Ancestral Home where he was born, Zhongshan. States that Sun Yat-sen was born here and the house was dismantled by the Sun Family in 1913.

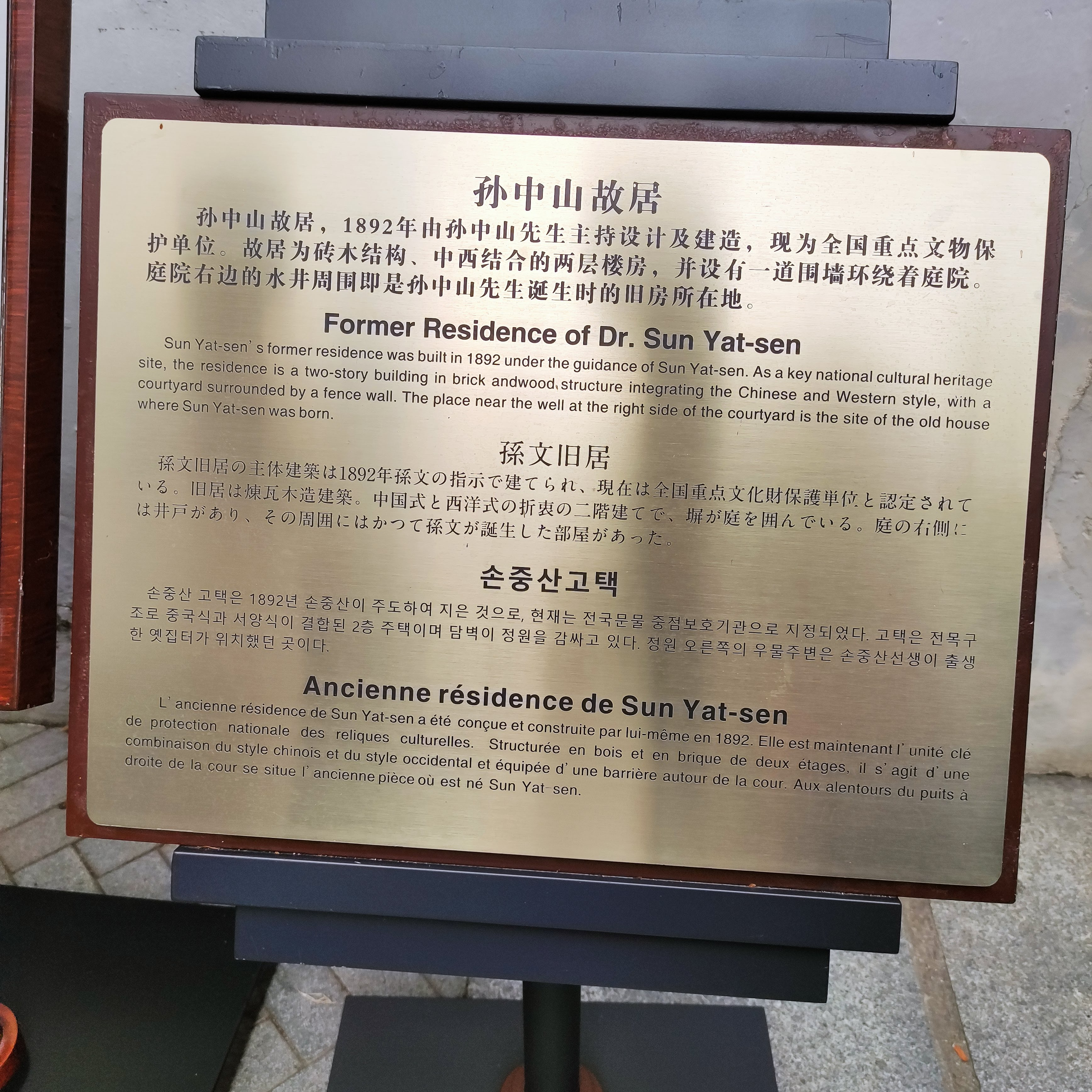
Plaque in front of the Former Residence of Sun Yat-sen, Zhongshan stating that the residence was built in 1892 under the guidance of Sun Yat-sen

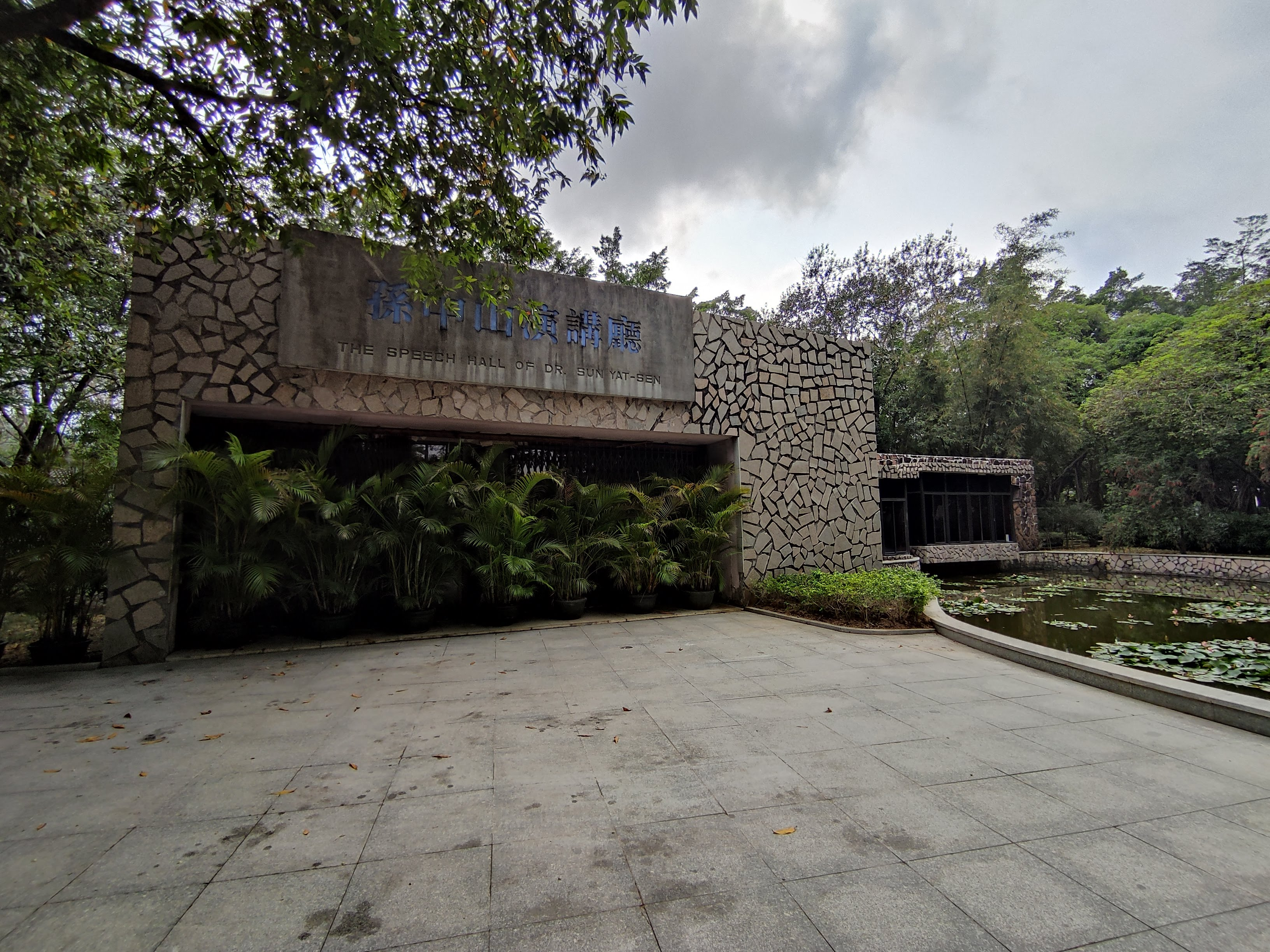
Conference Hall, Sun Yat-sen Memorial Museum, Zhongshan

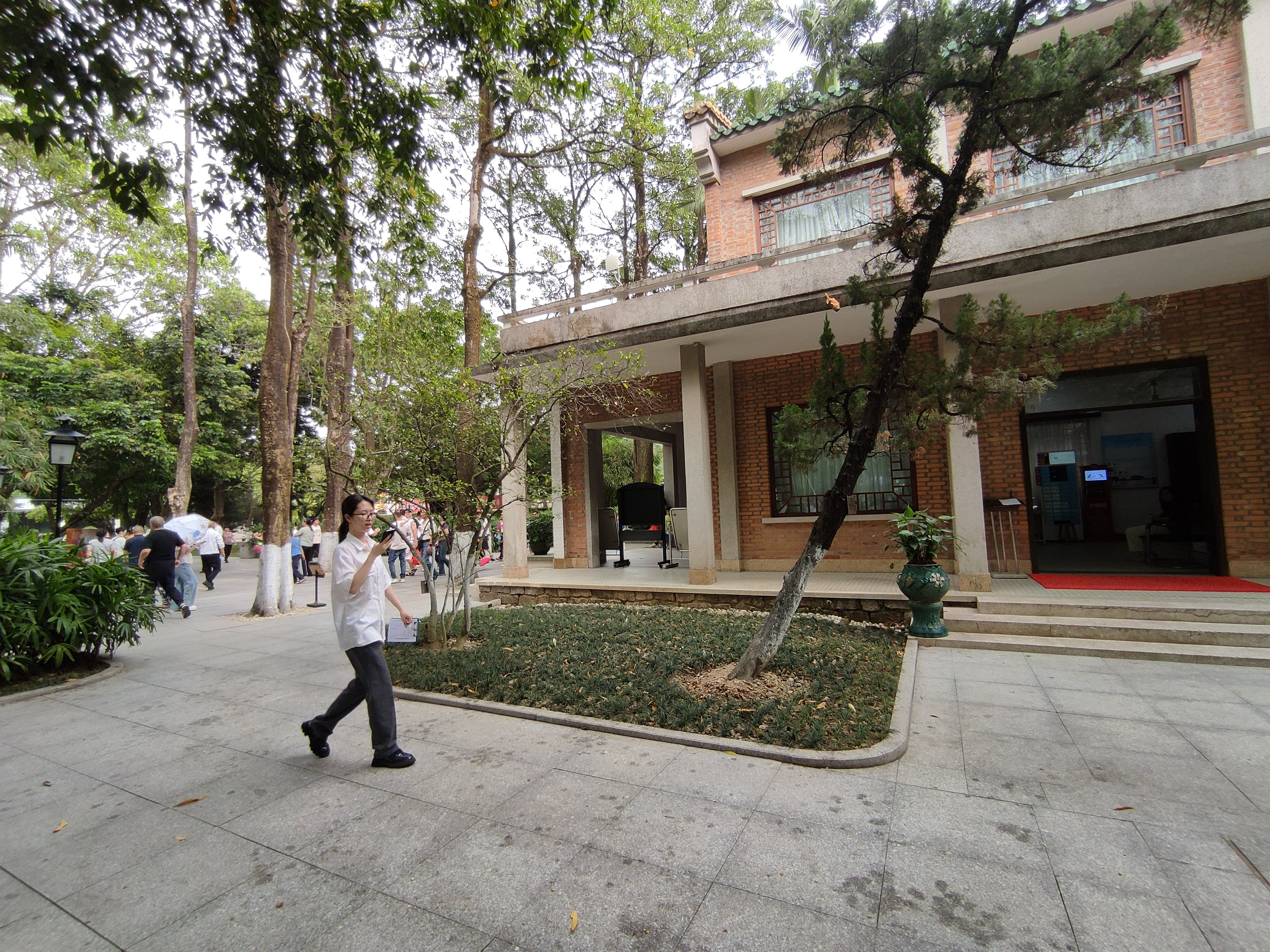
A Building in Sun Yat Sen Memorial Museum

== Transportation ==
Cuiheng can be accessed by Zhongshan Bus 12 and 212. The village is a 30–40 minutes by bus from Zhongshan city centre on Bus 12, and 50-minutes from the Zhongshan Passenger Ferry Dock on Bus 212. The township of Nanlang, about 10 minutes to the north by bus on both routes, has a station on the Guangzhou–Zhuhai Intercity Railway.
