= Haru (given name) =

- Gender: Unisex, predominantly male
- Language: Japanese

Origin
- Origin: Japan
- Meaning: Sunshine; springtime

Other names
- Alternative spelling: はる ハル
- Related names: Haruna, Haruka, Haruko, Harika

Haru (はる, ハル) is a unisex Japanese given name.

== Written forms ==
The meaning varies depending on the kanji used to write it. Several written forms include:

- 春 — Springtime
- 陽 — Sun, sunlight
- 晴 — Clear, sunny
- 治 — Reign

== People ==
- Haru (Chikurin-in), Sanada Yukimura's wife
- Haru (actress) (born 1991, 波瑠), Japanese actress
- Haru Asada (浅田 春; 1882–1902), Japanese concubine of Sun Yat-sen
- Haru Kobayashi (1900–2005, ハル), Japanese musician
- Haru Kuroki (born 1990, 華), Japanese actress
- Haru Nemuri (春 ねむり; born 1995), Japanese singer, songwriter, and "poetry rapper"
- Haru Nishioka (西岡 ハル; 1905–1983), Japanese businessman and politician
- Haru Nomura (野村 敏京; born 1992), Japanese female professional golfer
- Haru M. Reischauer (1915–1998, ハル), Japanese writer
- Toshio Haru (波留 敏夫; born 1970), Japanese Nippon Professional Baseball outfielder
- Haru Wazaki (和崎 ハル; 1885–1952), Japanese politician

== Fictional characters ==
- Haru, a Mii character from Nintendo Wii
- Haru, a main character from My Roommate Is a Cat
- Haru, a character from Avatar: The Last Airbender
- Haru, a main character from Extraordinary You
- Haru, a main character from A Year of Springs
- Haru, a main character from Beastars
- Haru Glory, the main character from Rave Master
- Haru Midorikawa, character from Smile PreCure! (known as Harriet Swanson in English)
- Haru Miura, a major character from Reborn!
- Haru Okumura, a major character from Persona 5
- Haru Shinkai, a character from Digimon Universe: App Monsters
- Haru Urara, a character from Umamusume: Pretty Derby
- Haru Yoshida, a main character from My Little Monster
- Haru Sagara, a character from the supernatural mobile game Tokyo Debunker

== See also ==
- Haru (disambiguation)
