= Haruhiko =

Haruhiko is a masculine Japanese given name. Notable people with the name include:

- Haruhiko Arai (born 1947), Japanese screenwriter, publisher/editor of Eiga Geijutsu film magazine
- Haruhiko Ash, founder of Eve of Destiny, a Japanese industrial rock band founded in 1999
- Haruhiko Higashikuni (1887–1990), the 43rd Prime Minister of Japan for 54 days in 1945
- Haruhiko Jō, Japanese actor, theatre director and voice actor
- Haruhiko Kazama or List of Please Save My Earth characters "Please Save My Earth
- Haruhiko Kindaichi (1913–2004), Japanese linguist and a scholar of Japanese linguistics Kokugogaku
- Haruhiko Kon, Japanese field hockey player who competed in the 1932 Summer Olympics
- Haruhiko Kuroda (born 1944), has been the president of the Asian Development Bank since February 2005
- Haruhiko Mikimoto (born 1959), Japanese anime character designer, illustrator and manga artist
- Haruhiko Nishi (1893–1986), Japanese diplomat
- Haruhiko Okumura, Japanese engineer
- Haruhiko Sato (born 1978), former Japanese football player
- Haruhiko Shono (born 1960), Japanese computer graphics artist
- Haruhiko Tanahashi, Japanese automotive engineer for the Lexus LFA supercar
- Haruhiko Yamanouchi, Japanese–Italian actor, dancer and choreographer

== Fictional characters ==
- Haruhiko Aoyama (青山 晴彦), a supporting character from Seijuu Sentai Gingaman
- Haruhiko Ichijo (一条 晴彦), a character from Myriad Colors Phantom World
- Haruhiko Kobashikawa, the Ultimate Pilot from Danganronpa Another Despair Academy

== See also ==
- Haruka (disambiguation)
- Haruki (disambiguation)
- Haruko
- Hiriko
