= Top Gear (magazine) =

British car magazine

- Cover of the December 2024 issue
- Categories: Automobile magazine
- Circulation: 150,884 (ABC July – December 2013); Print and digital editions.
- First issue: October 1993; 33 years ago
- Company: Immediate Media Company
- Country: United Kingdom
- Based in: London, England
- Language: English
- Website: topgear.com
- ISSN: 1350-9624

Top Gear is a British automobile magazine, owned by BBC Worldwide, and published under contract by Immediate Media Company. It is named after the BBC's Top Gear television show. It was first published in October 1993 and is published monthly at a price of £5.99. As of December 2022, there have been a total of 360 issues published in the UK. The major presenters of the rebooted television series — Jeremy Clarkson, Richard Hammond, and James May — were regular contributors, along with the series' production staff. "Tame racing driver" The Stig also regularly features in their car tests, though he only communicates his thoughts and feelings through the articles of others. It is Britain's leading general interest car magazine in sales terms, with over 150,000 copies distributed each month in 2012, a drop of 50,000 from 2007. Previous columnists have included former Top Gear presenters Quentin Willson, Tiff Needell and Vicki Butler-Henderson.

Licensed editions are also published in China, the Czech Republic, Greece, Serbia, Lithuania, Latvia, the Middle East (with localised versions for each of the Arab countries), Indonesia, South Korea, South Africa, Russia, the Netherlands, New Zealand, Thailand, India, Belgium, Romania, Finland, Estonia, Sweden, Sri Lanka, Malaysia, and Singapore. In September 2004, the Philippine edition was released. On 7 May 2007, it was released in Bulgaria, on 16 November 2007 in Italy, on 14 February 2008 in Poland. An Australian edition that ran from June 2008 to October 2015. A Hong Kong Chinese edition was released in October 2008. A Turkish edition, called TopGear Turkey was released in May 2011. More recently, the Portuguese edition was released in June 2011. A German edition was released on 25 April 2013. After a year, the Polish edition is the third largest market, after the British and Russian editions. In January 2010, Top Gear magazine released its 200th edition, and a free 'best of TopGear magazine' supplement was included. In April 2014 the first issue of the Croatian edition was released, and in May 2015, a French edition was launched. In April 2016, the Spanish version was launched, edited by Axel Springer SE. In May 2017, a Sri Lankan edition of the magazine was launched at an event held at the Taj Sumudra Hotel, Colombo. The English-language magazine is published by Capital Media Pvt (Ltd). In July 2019 TopGear India ceased publication, with the agreement between Worldwide Media Pvt. (WWM) ending.

== Content ==
Current regular features include:

- Drives (one large group test, plus tests of new vehicles)
- Trending (new car news, faces and automotive culture)
- Columns (by Chris Harris, Paul Horrell and Sam Phillip)
- Features (Larger, experiential stories)
- Retro (Features of older and "youngtimer" cars and culture)
- Garage (Lifer reports, longterm tests of cars run by the TopGear Magazine Staff)
- Electric (A small list of Electric cars currently on sale in the UK. Feature introduced in the January 2021 issue replacing the Data segment of the magazine)
- Exhaust (A brief history of a brand or a company starting with Audi. The segment was introduced in the same issue as the Electric segment which also replaced the Data feature in the magazine starting from the January 2021 issue)
- Former content featured in the magazine
- Data (A collection of specs and prices of most cars on sale in the UK. The last time that it was featured was in the 2020 awards issue in December and got replaced with the Electric and Exhaust segments of the magazine in the next issue in January 2021)

== Giveaways ==
Top Gear Magazine has been known to give away a number of items free with the purchase of the magazine, including a number of promotional DVDs, books and CDs. The following is a comprehensive list of all of the items given away.

=== DVDs ===
- Back in the Fast Lane: Highlights from Series 1 and 2 – Highlights of the DVD Back in the Fast Lane
- The Best of Series Three and Four – Clips of challenges and reviews featured during series three and four
- Aston Martin V8 and Jaguar XK at the Ring – Richard Hammond and Sabine Schmitz race at the Nurburgring
- The Best of Top Gear: Revved Up – Highlights of the DVD Revved Up
- 007: The Car Chases – Clarkson, Hammond and May pick their favourite James Bond car chases of all time
- The Races – Three classic races broadcast during the first seven series of the show
- The Best of the Challenges – Highlights of the DVD Top Gear: The Challenges
- The Greatest Movie Chases Ever – Clarkson, Hammond and May pick eight of their favourite all time movie chases
- Planes, Rockets and Automobiles – Highlights of the DVD Top Gear: The Challenges 2
- The Best of the Stig – Challenges, power laps and reviews that feature The Stig
- Duel: Behind the Scenes – Behind the scenes of Clarkson's latest Christmas DVD, Duel
- Supercars – Challenges, power laps and reviews featuring some of the world's finest supercars
- Cars With Soul – Challenges, power laps and reviews featuring cars that are special to Clarkson, Hammond and May
- Senna – A DVD containing the show's tribute to Ayrton Senna, as well clips of the official Senna film

=== Books ===
- The Collected Thoughts of Clarkson – A collection of Clarkson's newspaper column writings
- Never Played Golf – A second collection of Clarkson's newspaper column writings
- The World's Worst 50 Cars – Clarkson's list of the world's worst fifty cars of all time
- Clarkson on Cars – A sample from Clarkson's book first published in 1996
- Clarkson on Cars – A free copy of Clarkson's book published in 2004
- May on Motors – A free copy of May's book first published in 2006
- The Best of the Columns – A selection of editorials by Clarkson, Hammond and May from the magazine
- 100 Top Supercars – Clarkson, Hammond and May's comprehensive list of the best supercars

=== CDs ===
- The Jam Packed Top Gear Magazine CD-ROM – A CD rom containing Top Gear related content
- Clarkson Rocks! – A compilation of ten top driving tracks, also given away free with The Sun in 2004

== Car of the Year (UK) ==
- 1993: Fiat Coupe
- 1994: Ferrari F355
- 1995: BMW 5-Series
- 1996: Lotus Elise S1
- 1997: Ford Puma
- 1998: Ford Focus
- 1999: Audi A2
- 2000: Fiat Multipla
- 2001: Ford Mondeo
- 2002: Range Rover
- 2003: Jaguar XJ8
- 2004: Nissan 350Z
- 2005: Toyota Aygo & Bugatti Veyron
- 2006: Jaguar XK
- 2007: Audi R8
- 2008: Volkswagen Scirocco
- 2009: Ferrari 458 Italia
- 2010: Citroën DS3
- 2011: Range Rover Evoque
- 2012: Toyota GT86
- 2013: Ford Fiesta ST
- 2014: BMW i8
- 2015: Ford Focus RS
- 2016: Alfa Romeo Giulia Quadrifoglio
- 2017: Honda Civic Type R
- 2018: Ford Fiesta ST
- 2019: Porsche Taycan
- 2020: Land Rover Defender
- 2021: Hyundai i20N
- 2022: Honda Civic Type R
- 2023: Hyundai Ioniq 5N
- 2024: Renault 5
- 2025: BMW iX3

=== Car of the decade (UK) ===
- 2000s: Bugatti Veyron, the award was also presented on Top Gear

== Supercar of the Year (UK) ==
- 2006: Ferrari 599 GTB Fiorano
- 2007: Nissan GT-R
- 2008: Chevrolet Corvette C6 ZR1
- 2009: Ferrari 458 Italia
- 2010: Koenigsegg Agera
- 2011: Lamborghini Aventador
- 2012: Ferrari F12 Berlinetta
- 2013: Ferrari 458 Speciale
- 2014: Lamborghini Huracán
- 2015: Ferrari 488 GTB
- 2016: McLaren 570GT
- 2017: McLaren 720S
- 2018: Ferrari 488 Pista

== Men of the Year (UK) ==
- 2007: Lewis Hamilton, Peter Roberts (Road pricing petitioner), Colin Mcrae, Steve Fossett, Dario Franchitti, Luca de Meo, Angela Merkel, Michael Bay.
- 2010: Haruhiko Tanahashi, Sébastien Loeb, Ferdinand Piëch, Volker Mornhinweg, Ross Brawn, Jenson Button, Mark Lloyd (British Citroën designer).
- 2011: Adrian Newey, Takanobu Ito, Dario Franchitti, Jenson Button, Peter Schreyer, Victoria Beckham, Franco Cimatti, Dario Benuzzi.
- 2012: Ranulph Fiennes, Felix Baumgartner, Stefano Domenicali, Chris Hoy, Sid Watkins, Robert Kubica, Alex Zanardi, Ratan Tata, Ian Callum, Martin Winterkorn.

== See also ==
- Top Gear India, the Indian edition (ceased publication in July 2019)
- Top Gear: Turbo Challenge, a children's partwork based on Top Gear
