= Claire Cameron =

Canadian novelist & journalist (born 1973)

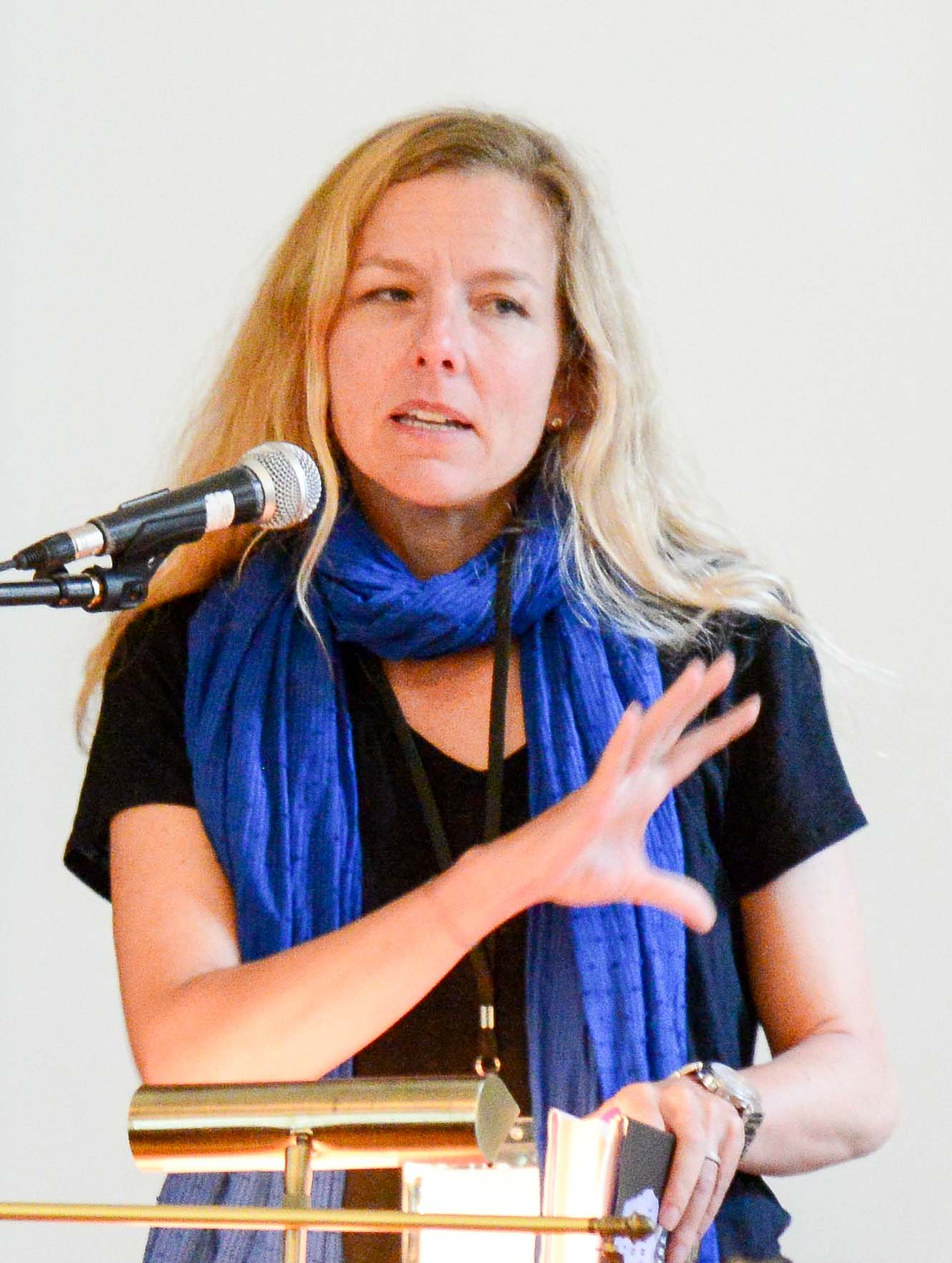
- Cameron at the Eden Mills Writers' Festival in 2017
- Born: March 1973 (age 53); Toronto, Ontario, Canada
- Occupations: Novelist, journalist
- Relatives: Angus Cameron (father)
- Writing career
- Language: English
- Website: www.claire-cameron.com

Claire Cameron (born March 1973) is a Canadian novelist and journalist.

== Personal life ==
Her father Angus Cameron was a prominent academic at the University of Toronto who founded the Dictionary of Old English. Born and raised in Toronto, Canada, Cameron attended Northern Secondary School (Toronto) and Queen's University for History and Culture (in Kingston, Ontario). Cameron was a wilderness instructor for Outward Bound and she worked for The Taylor Statten Camps in Algonquin Park. Later she interned for Sierra Club Books in San Francisco and co-founded the consulting company Shift Learning in London, England. She now resides in Toronto with her husband and two children.

== Writing ==
=== Novels ===
Cameron's first novel, The Line Painter, was published in 2007 by HarperCollins Canada. It won the 2008 Northern Lit Award from the Ontario Library Service and was nominated for a 2008 Arthur Ellis Crime Writing Award for best first novel. Cameron has said in regards to beginning her writing career and specifically Line Painter, "I almost made an album. I had one decent song for the album. It was about a guy who paints lines on the highway for a job. I wrote that song because it looked to me like painting lines was a simpler way to go about making a living. I nearly finished my album. I was recording my painting lines song, but I kept messing it up (because I can't sing or play). I got so frustrated, I ended up smashing my guitar around. This is the only rock star-ish thing I've ever done. After the smashing, all I had left was a half decent idea about painting lines. I'm better at typing than I am at guitar, so I sat down and started to write."

Cameron's second novel, The Bear, was published in February 2014 by Little Brown & Company in the United States, Random House in Canada, and Harvill Secker/Vintage in the United Kingdom & Commonwealth. Cameron was leading a trip through Algonquin Park a year after the bear attack on Lake Opeongo of October 11, 1991, which ended in the death of two adults. The stories she heard continued to haunt her years later and eventually became the basis for The Bear . In The Bear, Cameron re-imagines the events of October 1991 by adding two small children into the mix. It is a bestseller in Canada and was recently long listed for the Baileys Women's Prize for Fiction (formerly the Orange Prize).

Cameron's third novel, The Last Neanderthal, was published (April 25, 2017) by Little Brown & Co in the U.S., Penguin Random House in Canada, and SEM Libri in Italian, and forthcoming from Cargo/De Bezige Bij in Dutch and Forlaget Bazar in Danish. She was profiled in The New York Times.

Her memoir How to Survive a Bear Attack was published by Knopf Canada in March 2025. The book won the Governor General's Award for English-language non-fiction at the 2025 Governor General's Awards.

=== Other Writing ===
Cameron is a monthly contributor to The Globe and Mail. She also writes reviews, interviews, and articles for The New Yorker, Outside Magazine, The Millions, The Rumpus, The Globe and Mail, and The Los Angeles Review of Books.

Cameron has also written a collection of last words from Texas inmates' final statements and an Op-Ed about tree planting for The New York Times.

Her short story, "Jude the Brave", won a silver medal for Fiction at the National Magazine Awards.

== Bibliography ==
- The Line Painter (2007) ISBN 9780002008358
- The Bear (2014) ISBN 9780385679022
- The Last Neanderthal (2017) ISBN 9780316314480
- How to Survive a Bear Attack (2025) ISBN 9781039056350
