= Roberta Frank =

American linguist (born 1941)

- Born: 1941 (age 84–85); New York City, U.S.
- Education: New York University (BA); Harvard University (PhD)
- Occupation: Professor
- Years active: 1968–present
- Title: Marie Borroff Professor Emeritus of English
- Spouse: Walter Goffart (m. 1977; died 2025)
- Website: Page at Yale

Roberta Frank (born 1941) is an American philologist specializing in Old English and Old Norse language and literature. She is the Marie Borroff Professor Emeritus of English at Yale University.

== Career ==
Frank received a B.A. in comparative literature from New York University in 1962 and a Ph.D. in comparative literature from Harvard University in 1968. Her doctoral dissertation was titled, "Wordplay in Old English Poetry". Frank taught at the University of Toronto beginning in 1968, from 1978 as a full professor and from 1995 as University Professor. She was awarded a Guggenheim Memorial Fellowship in 1985. At Toronto, she was involved with the Dictionary of Old English project and was the director of the Centre for Medieval Studies, Toronto, from 1994 to 1999.

In 2000, she joined the Department of English Language and Literature at Yale University, first as the Douglas Tracy Smith Professor of English and then, in 2008, as the Marie Borroff Professor of English. She is also a senior research fellow at the MacMillan Center for International and Area Studies. Frank was elected a fellow of the Medieval Academy of America in 1989, serving as the President of that Academy in 2006, and a fellow of the Royal Society of Canada in 1995. She co-founded the International Society of Anglo-Saxonists (now the International Society for the Study of Early Medieval England) in 1981 serving as First Vice-President (1985–1986), then as its president (1986–87).

== Personal life ==
Frank was born in the Bronx. She was married to the medieval historian Walter Goffart (1934–2025).

== Research ==
Frank's research draws upon archaeological as well as literary and linguistic evidence to analyze aspects of early English and Scandinavian texts. Her work has focused on the poetry of England and Scandinavia, including numerous publications on skaldic verse, the early North, and Beowulf. Two festschriften in her honor have been published: Verbal Encounters: Anglo-Saxon and Old Norse Studies, ed. Antonina Harbus and Russell Poole (Toronto: University of Toronto Press, 2005) and The Shapes of Early English Poetry: Style, Form, History, ed. Eric Weiskott and Irina Dumitrescu (Kalamazoo, MI: Medieval Institute Publications, 2019). Her latest book, The Etiquette of Early Northern Verse, appeared in early 2022.

== Selected works ==
- “Some Uses of Paronomasia in Old English Scriptural Verse” (1972)
- Co-editor, A Plan for the Dictionary of Old English (1973)
- Old Norse Court Poetry (1978)
- “The Beowulf Poet’s Sense of History” (1982)
- “Germanic Legend in Old English Literature” (1991)
- Frank, Roberta (1992). "Beowulf and Sutton Hoo: The Odd Couple". In Kendall, Calvin B. & Wells, Peter S. (eds.). Voyage to the Other World: The Legacy of the Sutton Hoo. Medieval Cultures. Vol. 5. Minneapolis: University of Minnesota Press. pp. 47–64. ISBN 978-0-8166-2023-4. JSTOR 10.5749/j.ctttv0mr.8.
- Frank, Roberta (1998). "When Lexicography met the Exeter Book". In Baker, Peter S.; Howe, Nicholas (eds.). Words and Works. Studies in Medieval English Language and Literature in Honour of Fred C. Robinson. Toronto: University of Toronto Press. pp. 207–220. ISBN 0-8020-4153-1.
- “The Search for the Anglo-Saxon Oral Poet” (1993)
- “Like a Bridge of Stones” (2011)
- “Siegfried and Arminius: Scenes from a Marriage” (2013)
- Frank, Roberta (2008). "The Boar on the Helmet". In Karkov, Catherine E. & Damico, Helen (eds.). Aedificia Nova: Studies in Honor of Rosemary Cramp. Publications of the Richard Rawlinson Center. Kalamazoo: Medieval Institute Publications, Western Michigan University. pp. 76–88. ISBN 978-1-58044-110-0.
- Frank, Roberta (October 2007). "A Scandal in Toronto: The Dating of 'Beowulf' a Quarter Century On". Speculum. 82 (4). Medieval Academy of America: 843–864. doi:10.1017/S0038713400011313. JSTOR 20466079. S2CID 162726731.
- Frank, Roberta (2022). The Etiquette of Early Northern Verse. Conway Lectures in Medieval Studies. Notre Dame: University of Notre Dame Press. ISBN 978-0-26820-252-1.
