= Makio =

Makio may refer to:

- Makio, grind used in Aggressive Inline Skating
- MakiO, the yearbook of Ohio State University

== People with given name ==
- Makio Akiyama (秋山 万喜夫, born 1950), Japanese astronomer
- Makio Inoue (井上 真樹夫, 1938–2019), Japanese voice actor
- Makio Madarame (班目 真紀夫, born 1972), Japanese former cyclist

== People with surname ==
- Haruki Makio (牧尾 晴喜, born 1974), Japanese architectural translator

== Fictional characters ==
- Makio, a supporting character from Demon Slayer: Kimetsu no Yaiba
- Makio Tanihara, a supporting character from Hori-san to Miyamura-kun
