= Haruka =

Haruka may refer to:

== People ==
- Haruka (given name), a Japanese given name
- Haruka (model) (born 1975), Japanese fashion model

== Music ==
- "Haruka" (Melody song)
- "Haruka" (Scandal song)
- "Haruka" (Tokio song)
- "Haruka" (Yoasobi song)

== Other uses ==
- Haruka (fly), a genus of flies in the family Pachyneuridae
- Haruka (satellite) or HALCA, a Japanese decommissioned radio telescope satellite
- Haruka (train), a Japanese passenger train service
- Haruka: Beyond the Stream of Time, a video game series and media franchise
- Haruka (citrus), a Japanese citrus cultivar

== See also ==
- Haruka Seventeen, a Japanese media franchise
