= Haruka (given name) =

- Gender: Unisex, predominantly female

Origin
- Origin: Japanese
- Meaning: Different meanings depending on the kanji used

Haruka is a unisex Japanese given name.

== Written forms ==
Haruka can be written using different kanji characters and can mean:

- 春香, "spring, scent"
- 春花, "spring, flower"
- 晴香, "sunny, scent"
- 遥花, "eternal, flower"
- 春佳, "spring, good/fine/etc."
- 遥, "eternal"
- 悠, "permanence"

The name can also be written in hiragana (はるか) or katakana (ハルカ).

== People with the name ==
- Haruka (model) (春香; born 1975), Japanese fashion model
- Haruka Abe (安部 春香), Japanese-English actress
- Haruka Agatsuma (我妻 悠香; born 1994), Japanese softball player
- Haruka Aikawa (相川 春香; born 1994), Japanese shogi player
- Haruka Aizawa (あいざわ 遥; born 1970), Japanese manga artist
- Haruka Ayase (綾瀬 はるか; born 1985), Japanese actress, model and singer
- Haruka Chisuga (千菅 春香; born 1992), Japanese voice actress and singer
- Haruka Eigen (永源 遙; 1946–2016), Japanese professional wrestler
- Haruka Enomoto (榎本 遼香; born 1996), Japanese diver
- Haruka Fukuhara (福原 遥; born 1998), Japanese actress, voice actress and singer
- Haruka Fukushima (フクシマ ハルカ), Japanese manga artist
- Haruka Funakubo (舟久保 遥香; born 1998), Japanese judoka
- Haruka Futamura (二村 春香; born 1996), Japanese former member of the SKE48
- Haruka Hamada (浜田 遥; born 1993), Japanese footballer
- Haruka Hirota (廣田 遥; born 1984), Japanese trampoline gymnast
- Haruka Hirotsu (弘津 悠; born 2000), Japanese rugby union and sevens player
- Haruka Igawa (井川 遥; born 1976), Japanese actress
- Haruka Imai (今井 遥; born 1993), Japanese figure skater
- Haruka Inoue (井上 青香; born 1977), Japanese tennis player
- Haruka Inoue (井上 春華; born 2006), Japanese member of the Morning Musume
- Haruka Ishida (石田 晴香; born 1993), Japanese singer, actress and voice actress
- Haruka Iwao (岩尾 はるか; born 1986), Japanese mathematician and Google developer advocate
- Haruka Kaji (加治 遥; born 1994), Japanese tennis player
- Haruka Kaju (嘉重 春樺; born 2000), Japanese judoka
- Haruka Kaki (賀喜 遥香; born 2001), Japanese member of the Nogizaka46
- Haruka Kasai (葛西 春香; born 2004), Japanese Nordic combined skier and ski jumper
- Haruka Katayama (片山 陽加; born 1990), Japanese singer, actress and television personality
- Haruka Kato (加藤 悠; born 1989), Japanese gravure idol, television personality and professional wrestler
- Haruka Kinami (木南 晴夏; born 1985), Japanese actress
- Haruka Kitaguchi (北口 榛花; born 1998), Japanese javelin thrower
- Haruka Kodama (兒玉 遥; born 1996), Japanese singer
- Haruka Kohara (小原 春香; born 1988), Japanese singer
- Haruka Koizumi (小泉 遥香; born 2001), Japanese member of the Chō Tokimeki Sendenbu
- Haruka Komiyama (込山 榛香; born 1998), Japanese singer and model
- Haruka Kudō (singer) (工藤 遥; born 1999), Japanese singer and actress
- Haruka Kudō (voice actress) (工藤 晴香; born 1989), Japanese voice actress
- Haruka Kumazaki (熊崎 晴香; born 1997), Japanese member of the SKE48
- Haruka Kuroda (黒田 はるか; born 1977), Japanese-born English actress
- Haruka Kuromi (黒見 明香; born 2004), Japanese member of the Nogizaka46
- Haruka Mano (間野 春香; born 1995), Japanese former member of the SKE48
- Haruka Minami (みなみ 遥), pen name of Kazuka Minami, Japanese manga artist
- Haruka Miyashita (宮下 遥; born 1994), Japanese volleyball player
- Haruka Miyauchi (宮内 晴香), better known as Miya, Japanese singer and former member of GWSN
- Haruka Morita-WanyaoLu (森田 遥; born 1996), Chinese professional golfer
- Haruka Motoyama (本山 遥; born 1999), Japanese footballer
- Haruka Nakagawa (仲川 遥香; born 1992), Japanese singer and actress
- Haruka Nakaguchi (中口 遥; born 1998), Japanese sports shooter
- Haruka Nakamura (中村 遥香; born 2008), Japanese artistic gymnast
- Haruka Nakamura (composer) (ハルカ ナカムラ; born 1982), Japanese composer, producer, pianist, and guitarist
- Haruka Nakanishi (中西 悠; born 1977), Japanese voice actress
- Haruka Nemoto (根本 悠楓; born 2003), Japanese professional baseball player
- Haruka Ogoe (小越 春花; born 2004), Japanese member of the NGT48
- Haruka Okazaki (born 1998), Japanese canoeist
- Haruka Ono (小野 晴香; born 1987), Japanese former member of the SKE48
- Haruka Oota (太田 遥香; born 2003), Japanese former member of the Angerme
- Haruka Orth (born 1982), Hungarian-American actress, director, and astrologer
- Haruka Osawa (大澤 春花; born 2001), Japanese professional footballer
- Haruka Saito (斎藤 春香; born 1970), Japanese softball player
- Haruka Sakuraba (桜庭 遥花; born 2006), Japanese model and singer
- Haruka Seko (瀬古 遥加; born 1996), Japanese BMX rider
- Haruka Shimada (島田 晴香; born 1992), Japanese singer and actress
- Haruka Shimada (kickboxer) (島田 知佳; born 1996), Japanese kickboxer
- Haruka Shimazaki (島崎 遥香; born 1994), Japanese singer and actress
- Haruka Shimotsuki (霜月 はるか; born 1986), Japanese singer and dōjin music composer
- Haruka Shiraishi (白石 晴香; born 1995), Japanese actress and voice actress
- Haruka Shiranami (白波 遥), alias of Japanese voice actress Hiroko Taguchi
- Haruka Suenaga (末永 遥; born 1986), Japanese actress and gravure idol
- Haruka Sumida (住田 悠華; born 2005), Japanese member of the Cutie Street
- Haruka Sunada (砂田 遙; born 1988), Japanese volleyball player
- Haruka Tachimoto (田知本 遥; born 1990), Japanese judoka
- Haruka Takachiho (高千穂 遙; born 1951), Japanese writer
- Haruka Tateishi (立石 晴香; born 1994), Japanese model and actress
- Haruka Terui (照井 春佳; born 1987), Japanese voice actress and singer
- Haruka Toko (床 秦留可; born 1997), Japanese ice hockey player
- Haruka Tomatsu (戸松 遥; born 1990), Japanese voice actress and singer
- Haruka Tono (遠野 遥; born 1991), Japanese novelist
- Haruka Tsujino (辻野 悠香; born 2001), Japanese musician
- Haruka Ueda (上田 春佳; born 1988), Japanese swimmer
- Haruka Umesaki (梅咲 遥; born 2001), Japanese professional wrestler
- Haruka Wakaizumi (若泉 春香; born 1987), Japanese handball player
- Haruka Wakasugi (若杉 遥; born 1995), Japanese goalball player
- Haruka Watanabe (渡邉 はる香; born 1972), Japanese ice hockey player
- Haruka Yamada (山田 遥楓; born 1996), Japanese professional baseball infielder
- Haruka Yamashita (山下 晴加; born 1995), Japanese model and beauty pageant winner
- Haruka Yamashita (山下 葉留花; born 2003), Japanese member of the Hinatazaka46
- Haruka Yamazaki (山崎 はるか; born 1991), Japanese voice actress and singer
- Haruka Yoshiki (吉木 悠佳; born 1998), Japanese singer and voice actress
- Haruka Yoshimura (佳村 はるか), Japanese voice actress
- Tsukushi Haruka (春輝つくし; born 1997), Japanese retired professional wrestler

== Fictional characters ==
- Haruka (Ape Escape) or Helga, a character in the video game series Ape Escape
- Haruka, a character in the video game series Senran Kagura
- Haruka (Maskman) (ハルカ), a character in the tokusatsu series Hikari Sentai Maskman
- Haruka, a character in the video game My Japanese Coach
- Haruka (Pokémon) (ハルカ) or May, Pokémon characters
- Haruka (Sister Princess) (春歌), a character in the manga series Sister Princess
- Haruka (Tactics) (春華), a character in the manga series Tactics
- Haruka (Yakuza), a character in the video game Yakuza
- Haruka, a character in the anime film Oblivion Island: Haruka and the Magic Mirror
- Haruka Amami (天海 春香), a character in the video game series The Idolmaster
- Haruka Dōmeki (百目鬼 遥), a character in the manga series xxxHolic
- Haruka Gracia (はるか・グレイシア), a character in the anime series Basquash!
- Haruka Harukaze (春風 はるか), mother of the title character in the anime series Ojamajo Doremi
- Haruka Haruno (春野 はるか), protagonist of the anime series Go! Princess PreCure
- Haruka Hasegawa (長谷川 遥), a character in the manga series Moyasimon: Tales of Agriculture
- Haruka Hikari (光 はる香), a character in the manga series MegaMan NT Warrior
- Haruka Hoshi (星 ハルカ), a character in the anime series Gyakuten! Ippatsuman
- Haruka Inaba (因幡 遥), a character in the manga series Cuticle Detective Inaba
- Haruka Kaminogi (上乃木 ハルカ), protagonist of the anime series Noein
- Haruka Kasugano (春日野 悠), protagonist of the visual novel Yosuga no Sora
- Haruka Kasuga (春日 はるか), a character in the tokusatsu series Silver Kamen
- Haruka Kiritani (桐谷 遥), a character from the video game Hatsune Miku: Colorful Stage!
- Haruka Kito (鬼頭 はるか), main character and one of the five in the 46th Super Sentai Series "Avataro Sentai Donbrothers"
- Haruka Kokonose (九ノ瀬 遥), a character in the media franchise Kagerou Project
- Haruka Konoe (近江 遥), a character in the video game Love Live! School Idol Festival
- Haruka Kotoura (琴浦 春香), protagonist of the manga series Kotoura-San
- Haruka Kuran (玖蘭 悠), a character in the manga series Vampire Knight
- Haruka Kuze (久瀬 遥), a character in the film Battle Royale II: Requiem
- Haruka Kyan (喜屋武 はるか), a character in the manga series After the Rain
- Haruka Mano (真野 ハルカ), a character in the anime series Devil Hunter Yohko
- Haruka Minami (南 春香), a character in the manga series Minami-ke
- Haruka Minazuki (水無月 遥), protagonist of the media franchise Kaitō Tenshi Twin Angel
- Haruka Mizuno (水野 遥), a character in the manga series Tokyo Daigaku Monogatari
- Haruka Mizusawa (水澤 悠), protagonist of the tokusatsu series Kamen Rider Amazons
- Haruka Morishima (森島 はるか), a character in the video game series Amagami
- Haruka Morishita (森下 はるか), a character in the manga series Mirmo!
- Haruka Nanami (七海 春歌), protagonist of the visual novel series Uta no Prince-sama
- Haruka Nanase (七瀬 遙), a character in the anime series Free!
- Haruka Nishida (西田 はるか), a character in the manga series Kanamemo
- Haruka Nogizaka (乃木坂 春香), a character in the light novel series Nogizaka Haruka no Himitsu
- Haruka Ōzora (大空 遥), a character in the manga series Harukana Receive
- Haruka Ōzora (大空 遥), mother of Hiro Ōzora, a character from Little Battlers Experience W
- Haruka Saigusa (三枝 葉留佳), a character in the visual novel Little Busters!
- Haruka Sakomizu (迫水 ハルカ), a character in the media franchise Strike Witches
- Haruka Sakura (桜 遥), a character in the manga series Wind Breaker
- Haruka Sakurada (櫻田 遥), a character in the manga series Castle Town Dandelion
- Haruka Sawamura (澤村 遥), a character in the media franchise Yakuza
- Haruka Shigi (鷸 ハルカ), a character in the manga series Sekirei
- Haruka Shiraishi (白石 遥), a character in the manga series Chu-Bra!!
- Haruka Shitow (紫東 遙), a character in the anime series RahXephon
- Haruka Suzumiya (涼宮 遙), a character in the visual novel Kimi ga Nozomu Eien
- Haruka Suzushiro (珠洲城 遥), a character in the anime series My-HiME
- Haruka Takagi, a character in the anime series Soar High! Isami
- Haruka Takayama (高山 春香), a character in the manga series Sakura Trick
- Haruka Tanizawa (谷沢 はるか), a character in the manga series Battle Royale
- Haruka Tenoh (天王 はるか), a supporting character in the manga and anime series Sailor Moon as well as its 2014-2023 reboot
- Haruka Urashima (浦島 はるか), a character in the manga series Love Hina
