= Angus Cameron (academic) =

Canadian linguist and lexicographer

Angus Fraser Cameron (11 February 1941 – 27 May 1983) was a Canadian linguist and lexicographer.

== Life ==
Cameron was born in Nova Scotia on 11 February 1941 and educated at Truro Senior High School (winning the Governor General's award in 1958) and Mount Allison University before winning a Rhodes Scholarship to Jesus College, Oxford. He was then a lecturer at Mount Allison University before completing a post-graduate degree at Oxford in 1968 entitled "Old English nouns of colour: a semantic study". This was the starting point for his later lexicographical work. In 1968, he was appointed as a lecturer in the Department of English and Centre for Medieval Studies by the University of Toronto, becoming a professor in 1977 and being elected a Fellow of the Royal Society of Canada in 1982. His daughter is writer Claire Cameron. He died of cancer in Toronto on 27 May 1983 at the age of 42.

Cameron was Ph.D. supervisor for Antonette diPaolo Healey, who would go on to continue his work on the Dictionary of Old English.

== Dictionary of Old English ==
Cameron began his lexicographical work in 1970 with the Dictionary of Old English, supported by the Canada Council. Work on this project was still ongoing at the time of his death, leading to the university becoming a centre of the study of Old English. He was one of the first to see the advantages of using computers for lexicographical work. Declining health in later life prevented him taking up the appointment as Director of the Centre for Medieval Studies.
