= Haruki =

Haruki is both a masculine/neutral Japanese given name and a Japanese surname. Notable people with the name include:

Given name:

- Haruki Arai (新井 晴樹, born 1998), Japanese footballer
- Haruki Fujimoto (藤本 治貴, born 1974), Japanese-born theatre performer
- Haruki Ihara (伊原 春樹, born 1949), Nippon Professional Baseball player for the Nishitetsu Lions
- Haruki Ishiya (石谷 春貴, born 1992), Japanese voice actor
- Haruki Izawa (井澤 春輝, born 1999), Japanese footballer
- Haruki Kadokawa (角川 春樹, born 1942), Japanese publisher, film producer, director and screenwriter
- Haruki Kanashiro (born 1977), Peruvian footballer
- Haruki Makio (牧尾 晴喜, born 1974), Japanese architectural translator
- Haruki Matsui (松井 治輝, born 2002), Japanese footballer
- Haruki Mori (森 治樹, 1911-1988), Japanese diplomat
- Haruki Murakami (村上 春樹, born 1949), Japanese writer and translator
- Haruki Muramatsu (村松 治樹, born 1977), Japanese darts player
- Haruki Nakamura (born 1986), American football safety
- Haruki Nishikawa (西川 遥輝, born 1992), Japanese professional baseball player
- Haruki Ohmichi (大道 温貴, born 1996), Japanese baseball player
- Haruki Saruta (猿田 遥己, born 1999), Japanese footballer
- Haruki Seto (瀬戸 春樹, born 1978), Japanese football player
- Haruki Shimokawa (下川 陽輝, born 2003), Japanese footballer
- Haruki Toyama (遠山 悠希, born 2003), Japanese footballer
- Haruki Uemura (上村 春樹, died 2006), former judoka from Japan
- Haruki Yamashita (born 1999), Japanese cross-country skier
- Haruki Yoshida (吉田 晴稀, born 2001), Japanese footballer

Surname:

- Etsumi Haruki (はるき 悦巳, born 1947), Japanese manga artist
- Hiroshi Haruki (春木 博, died 1997), Japanese mathematician
- Minori Haruki (春木 三憲, born 1999), Japanese artistic gymnast
- Misayo Haruki (春木 みさよ, born 1974), Japanese actress

== Fictional characters ==
- Haruki Izumo (出雲 ハルキ), one of the main characters from the game and anime Little Battlers Experience WARS.
- Haruki Komi (小見春樹), a character from the manga and anime Haikyu!! with the position of libero from Fukurōdani Academy.
- Haruki Nakayama (中山 春樹), a character from the manga and anime Given. He is the bassist in the band.
- Haruki Shiga (志賀春樹), the main character from the light novel and anime I Want to Eat Your Pancreas.
- Hayato Haruki (隼人 春木), a character from the video game Yandere Simulator

== See also ==
- Haruki Station, train station in Kishiwada, Osaka Prefecture, Japan
