= Middle English Dictionary =

Dictionary of Middle English published by the University of Michigan

The Middle English Dictionary is a dictionary of Middle English published by the University of Michigan. It comprises roughly 15,000 pages with a comprehensive analysis of lexicon and usage for the period 1175–1500, based on the analysis of over three million quotations from primary sources. It is the largest collection of this kind available.

The project began in 1925. The first installment, "Plan and Bibliography", containing a list of Middle English texts used for the dictionary, was published by Hans Kurath and Sherman Kuhn in 1954. More fascicles were published in numerous volumes (in alphabetical order) over the next several decades. The dictionary was completed in 2001.

In 2007, the full dictionary was made freely available and searchable online in an HTML format.

== See also ==
- Middle English
- Dictionary of Old English
- Oxford English Dictionary
