= Haru =

Haru may refer to:

== Film ==
- Haru (1996 film), a Japanese film
- Hal (2013 film), a Japanese film

== Fictional characters ==
- Haru Glory, a character in the manga Rave Master
- Haru Miura, a character in the manga Reborn!
- Haru Okumura, a character from Persona 5
- Hatsuharu Soma, often called Haru, a character in the manga Fruits Basket
- Haru Tokashiki, a character in the Japanese tokusatsu drama Ressha Sentai ToQger
- Yoshida Haru, a male protagonist in the anime My Little Monster
- Haru, a character in the anime series Tsuritama
- Haru, male protagonist of 2019 Korean drama Extraordinary You
- Haru, a principal fictional character in Beverly Hills Ninja
- Haruna, often called Haru Haru by Kirishima and a fictional character in the manga Arpeggio of Blue Steel and associated anime
- Haru Urara (Umamusume), a character from Umamusume: Pretty Derby

== Other uses ==
- Haru (woreda), a woreda (district) in Ethiopia
- Haru (given name), a unisex Japanese given name
- Haru (actress), Japanese actress and model
- "Haru" (Yorushika song), 2024

== See also ==
- "Haru Haru", 2008 single by Korean boy group Big Bang
