= Antonette diPaolo Healey =

Philologist

Professor Antonette diPaolo Healey

Academic background
- Education: University of Toronto

Academic work
- Discipline: Medieval Philology, Medieval literature and culture, Old English
- Notable works: The Dictionary of Old English

Antonette diPaolo Healey is a philologist and a scholar of Old English literature and language. She has published on lexicography, glossography, and history of the English language. diPaolo Healey edited seven releases of The Dictionary of Old English (DOE), overseeing the development of the dictionary from physical material, microfiche, CD-ROM, through to the creation of the website. She is currently Professor Emerita of English at University of Toronto.

== Research ==
diPaolo Healey's research interests include Old English literature and language, philology and lexicography, and medieval culture. di Paolo Healey received her PhD at the University of Toronto in 1973, supervised by Angus Cameron, the founding editor of the DOE. Her thesis included producing the first modern edited version or editio princeps of the Old English text 'Vision of St. Paul '.

diPaolo Healey was one of the first women hired to teach at Yale University, between 1974 and 1978. She returned to Toronto in 1978 to teach and work at the DOE.

diPaolo Healey held the position of Cameron Professor of Old English Language and Literature and Chief Editor of The Dictionary of Old English, overseeing seven releases of the Dictionary from 1986 to 2008. Haruko Momma, who would later become the Chief Editor of the DOE, worked as a research assistant under the Chief Editorship of diPaolo Healey.

diPaolo Healey served as an editorial board member for the Old English Dumbarton Oaks series in 2017–2018.

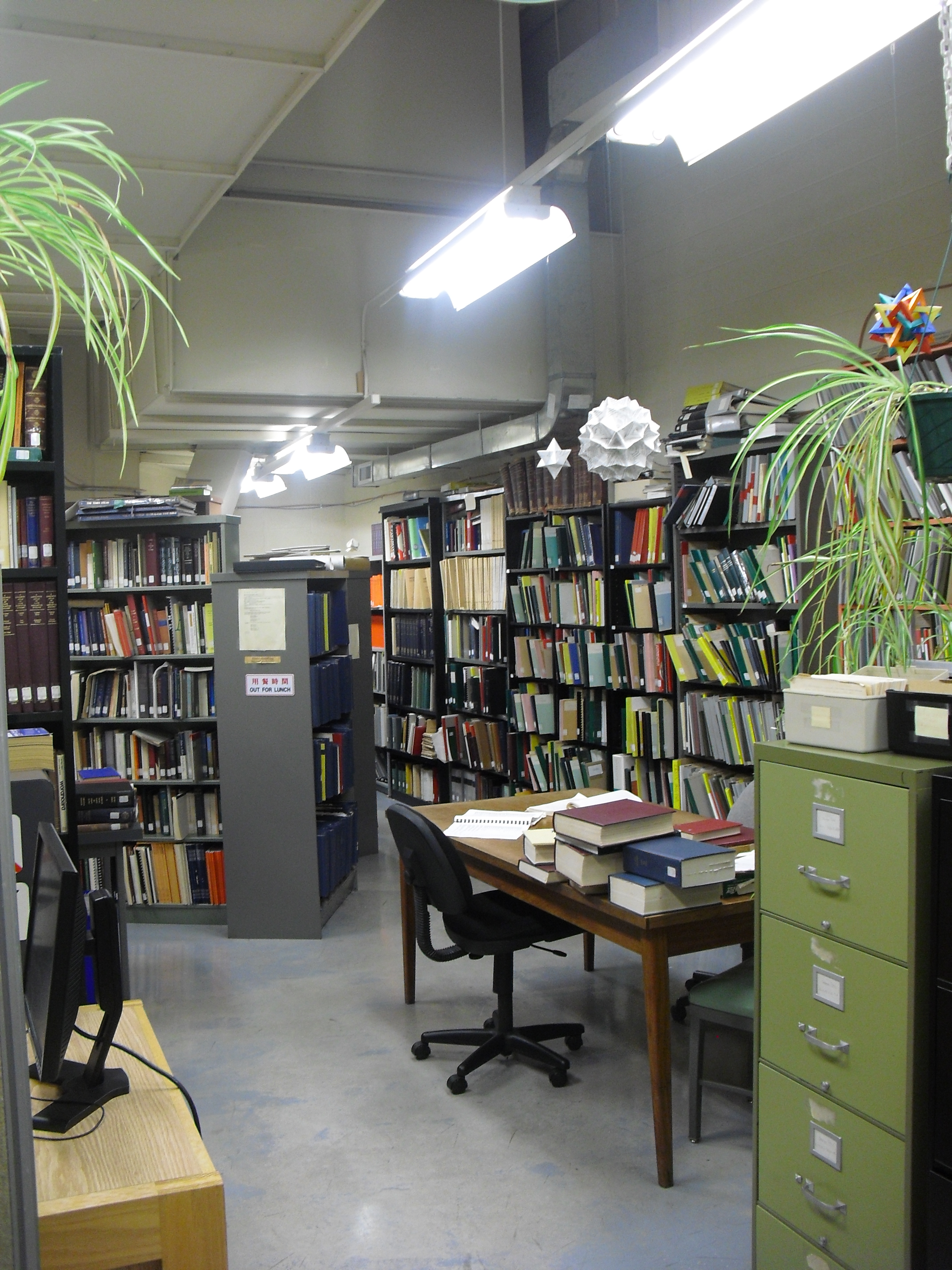
Office space at the Dictionary Of Old English, Toronto, 2011.

A 'festschrift', edited by Maren Clegg Hyer, Haruko Momma, and Samantha Zacher (all former students of Healey's), celebrating diPaolo Healey's contributions to medieval studies was published in 2020.

== Selected works ==
- Antonette diPaolo Healey, “Questions of Fairness: Fair, Not Fair, and Foul” in Unlocking the Wordhoard: Anglo-Saxon Studies in Memory of Edward B. Irving, Jr., ed. Mark Amodio and Katherine O’Brien O’Keeffe (Toronto: Univ. of Toronto Press 2003), 252–73.
- Antonette diPaolo Healey, The Dictionary of Old English: A to F (with Joan Holland, David McDougall, Ian McDougall, Nancy Speirs, and Pauline Thompson, and with the assistance of Dorothy Haines) with electronic version for Windows developed by Xin Xiang (Toronto 2003, on CD-ROM).
- Antonette diPaolo Healey, The Dictionary of Old English: F (with Joan Holland, David McDougall, Ian McDougall, Nancy Speirs, Pauline Thompson, with the assistance of Dorothy Haines) on microfiche (Toronto: Pontifical Institute of Mediaeval Studies, 2004), 7459 pages.
- Antonette diPaolo Healey, Dorothy Haines, Joan Holland, David McDougall, and Ian McDougall, with the assistance of Pauline Thompson and Nancy Speirs, The Dictionary of Old English: A to G, with electronic version for Windows developed by Xin Xiang(Toronto: Dictionary of Old English Project 2008, on CD-ROM).
- Antonette diPaolo Healey, John Price Wilkin and Xin Xiang, The Dictionary of Old English Corpus on the World Wide Web (Toronto: DOE Project 2009).
- Antonette diPaolo Healey, “The Future of the Past: Early English, Connectivity and Sustainability in a Digital Universe” in Ex Philologia Lux: Essays in Honour of Leena Kahlas-Tarkka, ed. Jukka Tyrkkö, Olga Timofeeva and Maria Salenius. Mémoires de la Société Néophilologique de Helsinki. Vol. 90 (Helsinki: Société Néophilologique 2013), 81–103.
