= Haruko Momma =

Japanese philologist

- Born: Japan

Academic background
- Education: Hokkaido University; University of Toronto
- Doctoral advisor: Roberta Frank

Academic work
- Discipline: Medieval Philology
- Institutions: New York University
- Notable works: The Composition of Old English Poetry

Haruko Momma is a Japanese philologist and a scholar of Old English literature and language. She has published on Old English poetic composition in Beowulf, philology in the nineteenth century, and has taught Old English. She is currently a professor of English at New York University.

Momma held the position of Cameron Professor of Old English Language and Literature at the University of Toronto between 2017 and 2019. As part of that role she served as the chief editor of The Dictionary of Old English. She was elected a Fellow of the Medieval Academy of America in 2025.

== Education ==
Momma was born in Japan and received her B.A. and M.A. in English from Hokkaido University. In 1983, she wrote her master's thesis on the composition of Beowulf, with supervision from Seizo Kasai. She moved to the University of Toronto in 1985 to begin her graduate studies under the supervision of Roberta Frank. While at Toronto, she was a research assistant at The Dictionary of Old English, which was then edited by Antonette diPaolo Healey and Ashley Crandell Amos. She received her Ph.D. in 1992.

== Research ==
Momma's research interests include Old English language and literature, philology and the philosophy of language, medieval culture, the culture of religion, and medievalism. Her first monograph, The Composition of Old English Poetry (1997), proposed an alternative to the syntactic laws of Hans Kuhn via a review of the entire corpus of Old English poetry. In her second monograph, Momma turned to English literature and language in the nineteenth century, focusing on how key philologists, including Max Müller and William Jones, shaped the study of the vernacular in Britain.

Momma gave a keynote at the second Race Before Race (#RaceB4Race) conference, hosted at the Arizona Centre for Medieval and Renaissance Studies in January 2019.

Momma gave one of two keynote addresses at the 'Remembering the Middle Ages' conference hosted by King's College London and Notre Dame London Global Gateway, April 2018. In her keynote, titled ‘Boy Meets Girl (?): Pedagogy and the World of Old English Literature’, Momma "discussed Old English pedagogical practices. She urged teachers to rethink the canon of teaching texts, to look for the easily accessible as well as the strange, and to trouble the continued use of the same selections as were available in Thorpe and Sweet’s readers."

== Selected works ==
- The Composition of Old English Poetry (1997). Cambridge University Press. ISBN 9780521030762.
- With Michael Matto, A Companion to the History of the English Language (2008). Wiley-Blackwell. ISBN 9781405129923.
- From Philology to English Studies: Language and Culture in the Nineteenth Century (2013). Cambridge University Press. ISBN 9780521518864.
- With Heide Estes. Old English Across the Curriculum: Contexts and Pedagogies, Studies in Medieval and Renaissance Teaching 22.2 (2015).
- 'Worm: A Lexical Approach to the Beowulf Manuscript' (2016). In Old English Philology: Studies in Honour of R.D. Fulk, edited by Leonard Neidorf, Rafael J. Pascual, Tom Shippey (Boydell & Brewer), pp. 200–214.
- With Maren Clegg Hyer and Samantha Zacher (Eds.), Old English Lexicology and Lexicography: Essays in Honor of Antonette Dipaolo Healey (2020). Boydell & Brewer. ISBN 9781843845614.
