= Toshio Haru =

Japanese baseball player and coach (born 1970)

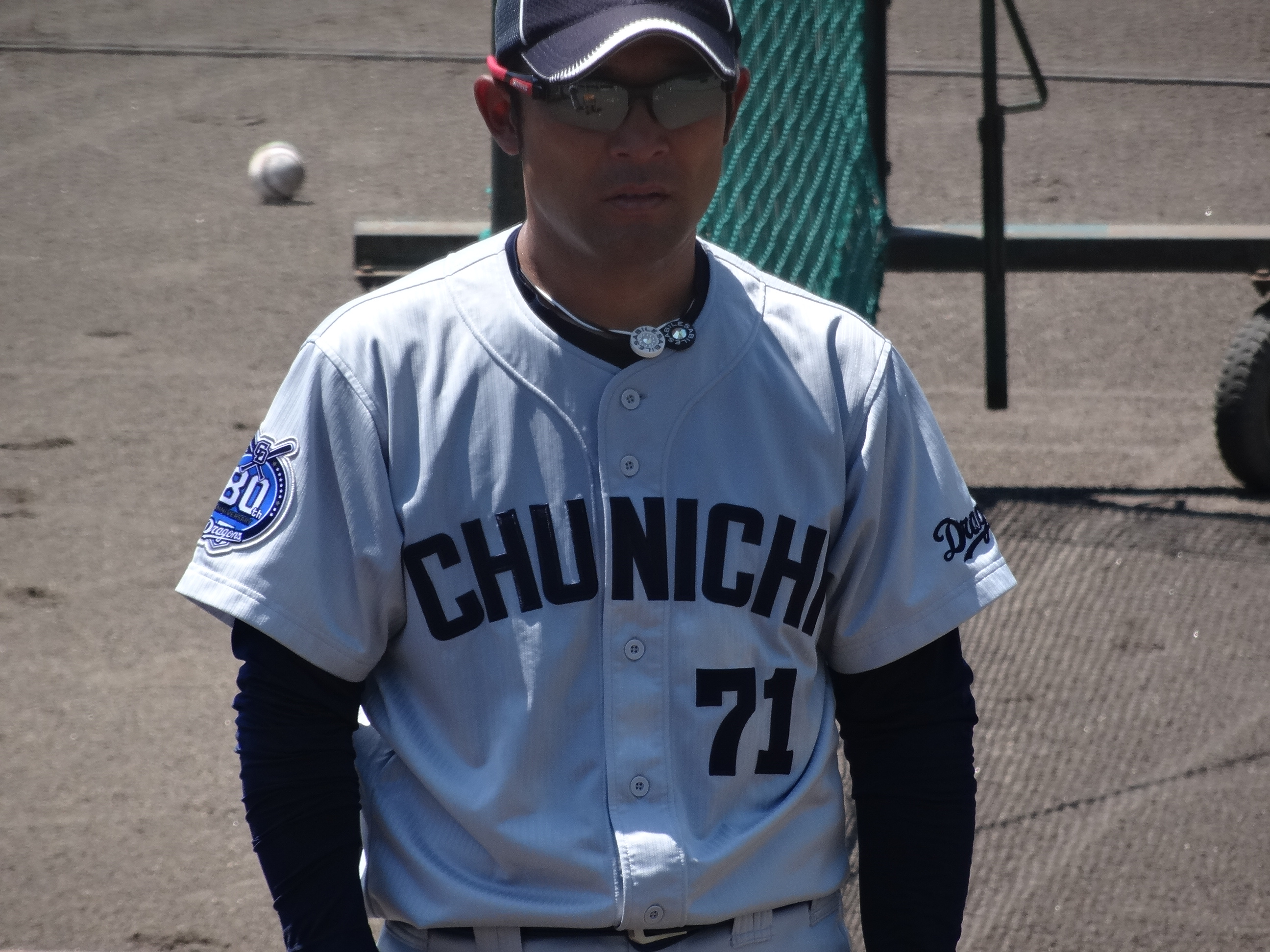

Orix Buffaloes – No. 90
- Outfielder / Coach
- Born: May 25, 1970 (age 55); Kyoto, Kyoto, Japan
- Batted: Right Threw: Right

NPB debut
- July 3, 1994, for the Yokohama BayStars

Last NPB appearance
- May 9, 2004, for the Chiba Lotte Marines

NPB statistics (through 2004)
- Batting average: .278
- Home runs: 44
- Hits: 872

Teams
- As player: Yokohama BayStars (1994–2001); Chunichi Dragons (2001–2002); Chiba Lotte Marines (2003–2004); As coach: Yokohama BayStars/Yokohama DeNA BayStars (2006–2013); Chunichi Dragons (2014–2022); Orix Buffaloes (2023-present)

Career highlights and awards
- 1× NPB All-Star (1997); Japan Series champion (1998)

Toshio Haru (波留 敏夫, born May 25, 1970, in Kyoto, Kyoto, Japan) is a former Nippon Professional Baseball outfielder.
