= Haru Wazaki =

Japanese politician (1885–1952)

- 和崎 ハル

Member of the House of Representatives
- In office 10 April 1946 – 31 March 1947
- Preceded by: Constituency established
- Succeeded by: Multi-member district
- Constituency: Akita at-large

Personal details
- Born: 1 February 1885 Akita City, Akita, Japan
- Died: 30 December 1952 (aged 67) Osaka Prefecture, Japan
- Party: Democratic
- Other political affiliations: Independent (1946–1947)

Haru Wazaki (Japanese: 和崎ハル; 1 February 1885 – 30 December 1952) was a Japanese politician. She was one of the first group of women elected to the House of Representatives in 1946.

== Biography ==
Born in Akita in 1885, Wazaki was educated at Akita Girls' High School, graduating in 1904. She then attended the Tokyo Girls' Music School. During her studies she married an army officer, Toyoyuki Wazaki. Following his death, she returned to Akita, where she initially worked as a masseuse, before opening a hair salon. She also became an agent of the Akita branch of the New Japan Women's Society.

Wazaki contested the 1946 general elections as an independent candidate in Akita, and was elected to the House of Representatives. She lost her seat in the 1947 elections after unsuccessfully running in Akita's first district. She was a Democratic Party candidate in the 1949 elections, but was again unsuccessful. She died in 1952.
