= Haru Asada =

Japanese concubine of Sun Yat-sen

Haru Asada (浅田春, Asada Haru, 1882–1902) was the Japanese teenage concubine of Sun Yat-sen, the founder of the Republic of China.

Asada was born in Shizuoka Prefecture, Japan, and spoke both fluent Chinese and English. She encountered Sun when she worked as a maid in Sun's house in Yokohama. She died in 1902, and Sun married a younger Japanese girl named Kaoru Otsuki in 1905.
