= Centre for Medieval Studies (University of Toronto) =

Academic unit of the University of Toronto Faculty of Arts and Science

- Parent institution: University of Toronto Faculty of Arts and Science
- Established: 1964
- Focus: Medieval Studies
- Location: 125 Queen's Park, 3rd floor, Toronto, Ontario, Canada
- Coordinates: 43°40′6″N 79°23′37″W
- Website: medieval.utoronto.ca

The Centre for Medieval Studies (CMS) is a research centre at the University of Toronto in Canada dedicated to the history, thought, and artistic expression of the cultures that flourished during the Middle Ages.

The centre was founded as an extra-departmental unit (EDU) of the Faculty of Arts and Science in 1964, with Bertie Wilkinson as its first director. Its foundation was announced in the journal Speculum:

The intention of the Center is to make available to students various approaches to the Middle Ages in programs of studies not available in existing departments. The purpose of the Center is the training of scholars who know the Middle Ages in depth as well as in breadth. The courses of study will freely cross limits of traditional disciplines and departments, but they will be limited to the Middle Ages. By concentrating on a single period, the student will be able to acquire in some depth the basic linguistic and technical skills necessary for teaching and research in mediaeval studies; these include palaeography, diplomatics, and vernacular languages, in which the Center is strong. He will also be able to read widely in the period. His research will follow the material of his subject in order to gain a better understanding of the cross currents and variations in the cultures, interests, and beliefs of the Middle Ages.

The centre had originated in a Medieval Club that met at Hart House. It was inspired by the Pontifical Institute of Mediaeval Studies (PIMS), which had been founded in 1929 by Étienne Gilson. In turn, it was one of the inspirations for the University of Leeds Graduate Centre for Medieval Studies.

The centre's logo was designed by Allan Fleming, while he was head of graphic design at University of Toronto Press, from 1968 to 1976.

The centre is now located in the Lillian Massey Building, part of Victoria University, Toronto.

The centre publishes the Dictionary of Old English.

== See also ==
- List of academic units of the University of Toronto
