= Top Gear: Turbo Challenge =

- Categories: Cars
- Frequency: Fortnightly
- First issue: 6 January 2010
- Company: BBC Magazines
- Country: United Kingdom
- Language: English
- Website: www.topgearturbo.com

Top Gear: Turbo Challenge was a fortnightly partwork magazine published by BBC Magazines in the United Kingdom. Each issue was priced at £2.50 and came with a pack of trading cards. It is based on the popular BBC TV series, Top Gear and is mostly aimed at children. Top Gear: Turbo Challenge ceased publishing after issue 52 once the Platinum card set was completed.

== Collection(s) ==
As well as a trading cards there were also some other items accompanying some issues. The first issue came with two packets of Trading cards instead of the usual single packet. Issues 2 and 3 came with parts to build The Stig's helmet to keep the trading cards in. Issues 1-3 also came with parts of a buildable poster of The Stig which also featured a check list of the trading cards available. Issue 2 included a bonus Stig mask and issue 3 also included a bonus door hanger.

Extra Cards

The second wave of trading cards was Top Gear: Turbo Challenge Extra. Packets were once again provided with issues of the magazine and were also available to buy as single packs.

Platinum Cards

The third wave of trading cards was the Limited Edition Platinum Collection. This set consists of 105 cards including three Ultimate Rare Presenter Autograph cards which are available as bonus cards in issues 36 (the issue in which the collection first started), 44 and 52. Each pack contains five rare and one super rare card. The Platinum Collection packs are exclusive to the magazine and different cards are provided with each issue to prevent duplicates.

== Content ==
Below is a list of things featured in a normal issue of Top Gear: Turbo Challenge.

- Game Play
- Behind The Scenes
- Top Ten (Cars)
- Head-to-head
- Giant "The Stig" poster. (Issues 1–3)
- TV Challenge
- A-Z of amazing machines
- Motor Madness (Comic Strip)
- Puzzles

== Website ==
There is a website for fans of the magazine featuring free games based on challenges from the TV show and a 'garage' where users can log their cards. www.topgearturbo.com links the BBC's fortnightly magazine partwork Top Gear Turbo Challenge and the collectable cards that come with the magazine or are available separately. These three elements provide three distinct entry points for the brand and support each other with the magazine promoting the collectable cards and card codes unlocking game content and power-ups on the website. The free games and power-ups are central to the experience, working hand-in-hand with unique trading card codes and magazine editorial to maximise the engagement, reward the user and ultimately drive subscriptions.

The website and games were designed and built by Playerthree:

The UK, Ireland and South African versions of the website are now closed. The Australian version is still open.

== Controversy ==
Complaints have been raised about the total cost of the collection which will be in the region of £1000.00. With some children already complaining of high numbers of duplicate cards in the packs supplied on the cover of the magazine it would appear this may be an underestimate of the collection's total cost.
