= Haruko =

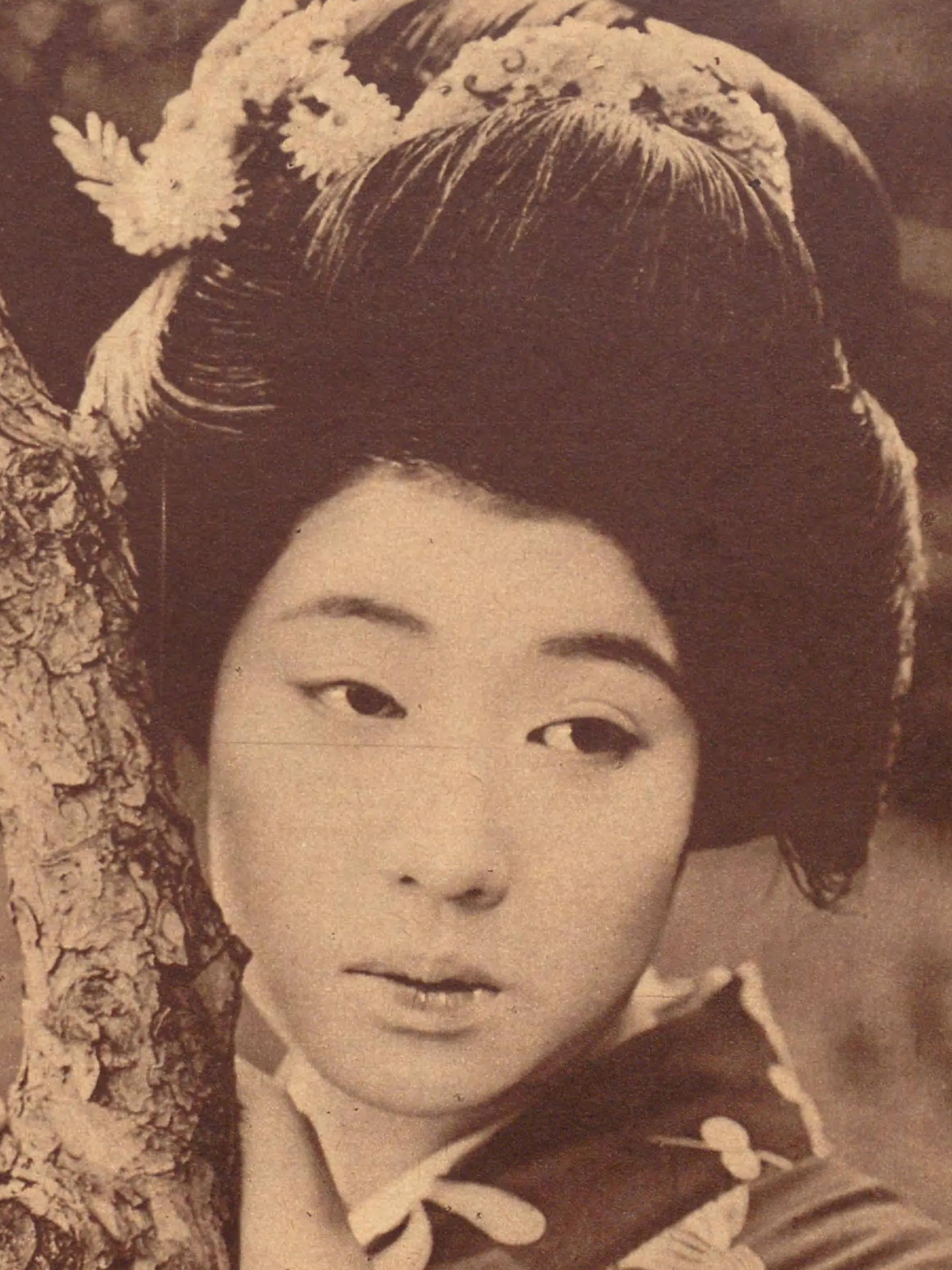
- Japanese actress Haruko Izumi (1925)
- Gender: Female

Origin
- Origin: Japanese
- Meaning: many different meanings depending on the kanji used.

Other names
- Related names: Haru, Haruka, Haruhi, Haruki, Harumi, Harue, Haruno, Haruna, Haruyo

Haruko (はるこ, ハルコ) is a feminine Japanese given name. Its most common translation is "spring child" (春子, which may also be read as a Korean name Chun-ja), though other kanji provide different meanings. Notable people with the name include:

- the personal name of Empress Shōken
- Princess Haruko (春子), the first daughter of Emperor Tsuchimikado
- Haruko Arimura (有村 治子; born 1970), Japanese politician
- Haruko Fujita (藤田 晴子; 1918–2001), Japanese pianist, teacher, music critic, and jurist
- Haruko Hasegawa (長谷川 春子; 1895–1967), Japanese painter, illustrator, and writer
- Haruko Hatoyama (鳩山 春子; 1863–1938), Japanese educator
- Haruko Ichikawa (市河晴子 or 市川晴子; 1896–1943), Japanese writer
- Haruko Kato (加藤 治子; 1922–2015), Japanese actress
- Haruko Matsuda (松田 治子; born 1972), Japanese former badminton player
- Haruko Miyaguchi (宮口 治子; born 1976), Japanese politician
- Haruko Momma (born 1959), Japanese philologist and a scholar of Old English literature and language
- Haruko Momoi (桃井 はるこ; born 1977), Japanese singer, songwriter and voice actress
- Haruko Nagaya (長屋 晴子; born 1995), Japanese member from pop rock band Ryokuoushoku Shakai
- Haruko Nawata Ward, Japanese religious historian
- Haruko Obokata (小保方 晴子; born 1983), Japanese biological scientist
- Haruko Okamoto (岡本 治子; born 1945), Japanese figure skating coach
- Haruko Okano (born 1945), Japanese-Canadian artist
- Haruko Sagara (相楽 晴子; born 1968), Japanese actress
- Haruko Saida (斎田 晴子; born 1966), Japanese women's professional shogi player
- Haruko Sugi Hurt (1915–2012), Japanese-American language translator
- Haruko Sugimura (杉村 春子; 1909–1997), Japanese stage and film actress
- Haruko Tachiiri (たちいり ハルコ; born 1949), Japanese manga artist
- Haruko Tanaka (1974–2019), Los Angeles–based artist and filmmaker
- Haruko Wakita (脇田 晴子; 1934–2016), Japanese academic
- Haruko Yoshikawa (吉川 春子; born 1940), Japanese politician

== Fictional characters ==
- Haruko Akagi, a character in the manga series Slam Dunk
- Haruko Haruhara, a character in the anime series FLCL
- Haruko Kamio, a character in the visual novel Air
- Haruko Kashiwagi, a character in the visual novel Muv-Luv
- Haruko Mikogami, a secondary character in the anime series Sky Girls
- Haruko Shido, a supporting character in the anime series Please Twins!
