= Haruhiko Tanahashi =

Japanese automotive engineer

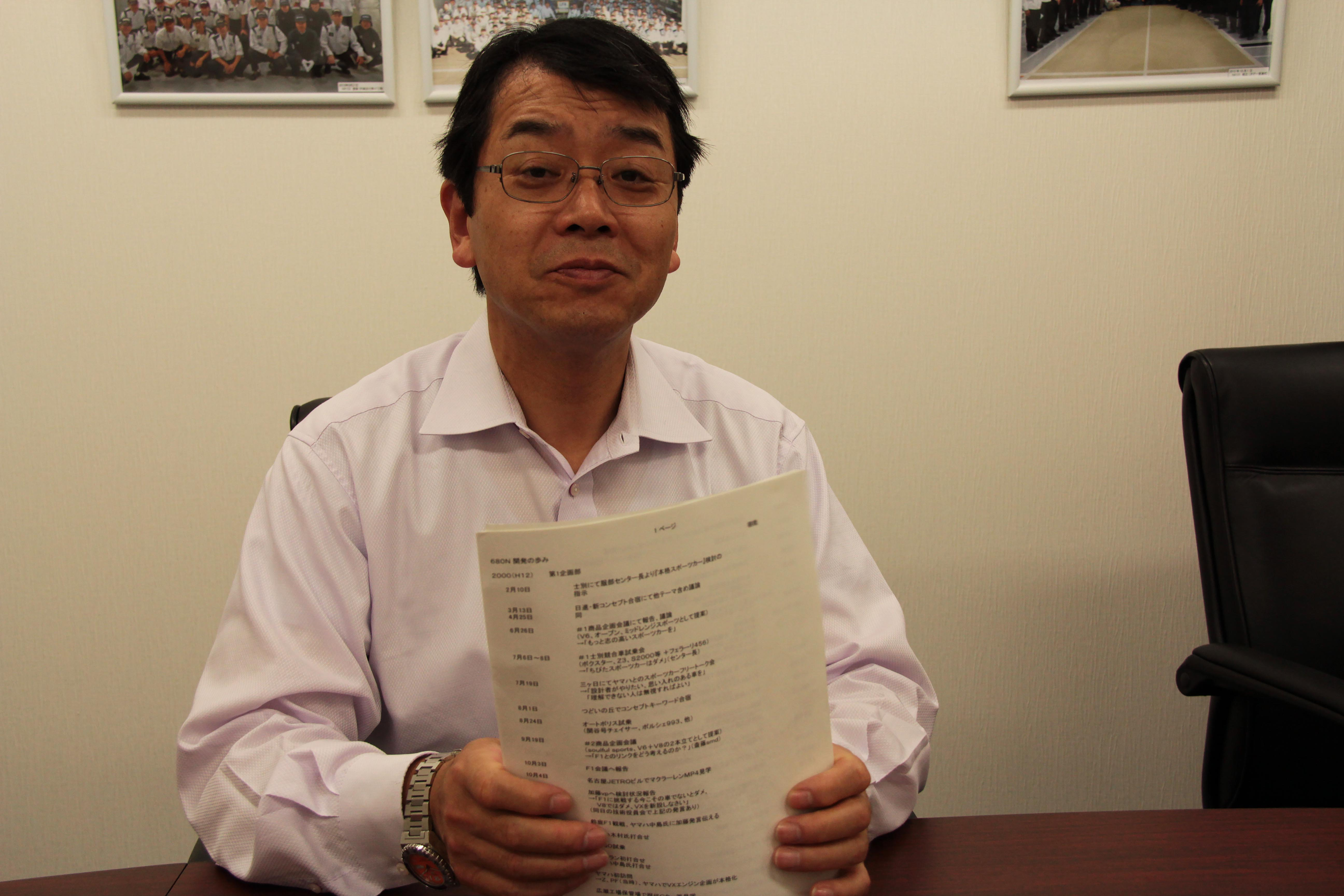
- Tanahashi holds pages of the LFA development diary
- Engineering career
- Discipline: Mechanical engineering
- Employer: Toyota Motor Corporation
- Projects: P280 program
- Significant design: Lexus LFA

Haruhiko Tanahashi (棚橋晴彦, Haruhiko Tanahashi) is a Japanese automotive engineer who is responsible for the design and construction of the Lexus LFA supercar. Tanahashi joined Toyota Motor Corporation in 1978 as a chassis engineer, and has since worked in new vehicle design for over 30 years. The LFA development program, begun as project 680, comprised over a decade of his career until the debut of the vehicle in 2009. Tanahashi holds eight automotive design patents, previously worked on earlier models including the Toyota Crown, Soarer and Aristo, and has been part of various Toyota and Lexus development divisions.

== Career ==
Tanahashi was hired by Toyota Motor Corporation in 1978, whereupon he was first assigned to the Chassis Engineering Division. There, he worked as a suspension engineer on vehicles such as the rear wheel drive Toyota Mark II, Crown, Soarer, and Aristo, along with the front wheel drive Toyota Corona, Corolla, and Celica. In December 1982 Tanahashi filed for his first U.S. patent, regarding the "upper support structure for front wheel suspension of automobile", which was granted in 1984. His work on the first generation Soarer included a patent for the vehicle's "electronic modulated air suspension"; other inventions included a "rack and pinion type steering gear device" and "twin-tube type shock absorber".

In 1992, Tanahashi was transferred to Toyota's Body Engineering Division, where he worked on passenger vehicle suspension architecture, and in 1995 he moved to Development Department 1 of the company's Advanced Vehicle Planning Division to oversee development of new vehicles, platforms, and technologies.

=== Chief engineer ===
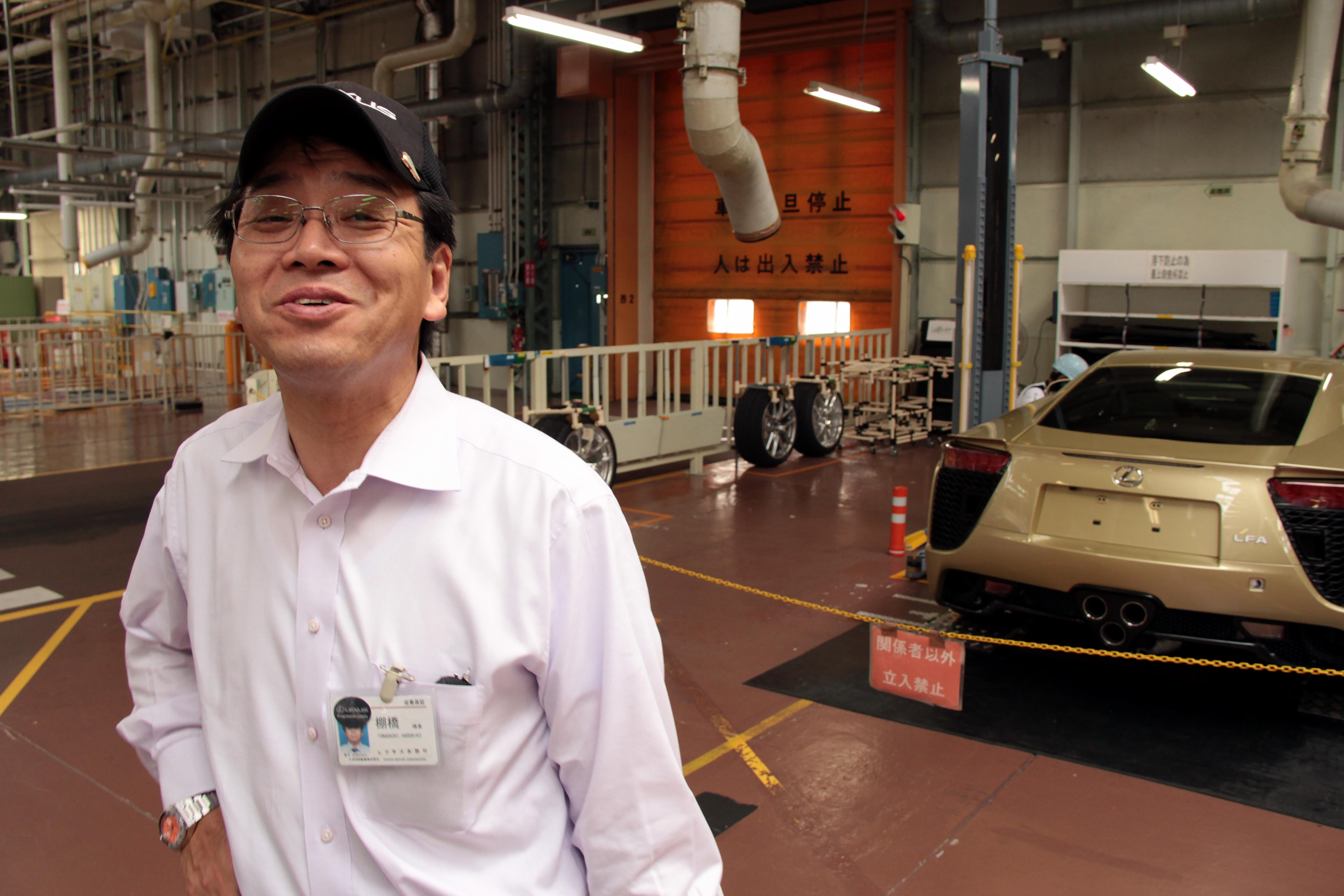
Haruhiko Tanahashi at the quality assurance station of the Lexus LFA, Motomachi Plant

In 2000, Lexus had begun project P280, which intended to create a supercar concept which would showcase 200-mph performance capabilities. In 2001, Tanahashi was promoted to the Lexus Development Center's newly founded Z department, where he was placed in charge of LFA development. The supercar design program opted for a front mid-engine configuration, an approach Tanahashi favored for its combination of dynamics and safety. The vehicle development process was unprecedented in the company's history, exceeding the previous Toyota Supra in performance class, and requiring new engine, cooling, clutch technologies.

Tanahashi's stated goal with the LFA was to produce "ultimate driving pleasure". At the culmination of the development process, Tanahashi remarked in an interview that he was most proud of the car's engine sound, its engine response, and handling. Following the completion of the LFA design program, Tanahashi remained at his current position within the Lexus Development Center.

== Works ==
- Tanahashi, Haruhiko (2024). LFA: The Roar of an Angel. Tokyo: Nana Agency.
