= Haruki Makio =

Japanese architectural translator (born 1974)

Haruki Makio (牧尾 晴喜, Makio Haruki; born October 12, 1974) is a Japanese architectural translator. Chief of Studio OJMM. The major fields of his work include translation in architecture and art as well as designing and writing.

== Biography ==
- Makio was born and still lives in Osaka.
- After his master's degree at RMIT University(Australia), he learned about design, architecture and languages of many countries.
- Established Studio OJMM in 2003 and incorporated as Fraze Craze Inc. in 2014.

== Bibliography ==
Major Translations

- Contemporary Architect's Concept Series (INAX Corporation)
- GA series (A.D.A. EDITA Tokyo)
- In charge of translation in "Journal of Architecture and Building Science" of AIJ (Architectural Institute of Japan)

== Others ==
- Planning, editing, and interviewing at "Gakugei Cafe" series (Gakugei Shuppansha Publishing)
- PhD (engineering), First-class registered architect
- First president of Osaka Next Rotary Club
