= Haruka (model) =

Japanese fashion model (born 1975)

- 春香
- Born: June 24, 1975 (age 50); Aichi Prefecture, Japan
- Occupation: Fashion model
- Years active: 1995 -
- Agent: Azur
- Height: 1.73 m (5 ft 8 in) (2008)
- Spouse: Keiichiro Hirano (2008 - )

Haruka (春香; born June 24, 1975, in Aichi Prefecture, Japan) is a Japanese fashion model who is represented by the talent agency, Azur.

== Biography ==
Haruka debuted in 1995 during college. During her university, she is majoring in child education and becoming a kindergarten teacher and elementary school teacher, to get that license.

After her debut, Haruka was appointed to appear in advertisements for Suntory and Kanebo Cosmetics. After agreeing with Kanebo Cosemetics she later appeared for another brand called Towani.

In 1998, Haruka signed a contract for the magazine Classy, and appeared on the magazine Domani from 2005 to 2007, and in 2008 she worked as a model and appeared in the cover for Grace. She obtained overwhelming support from women in the same generation.

In 2007, Haruka collaborated with mail order company Dinos for a brand called Cara by Haruka, and also become a fashion designer by announcing her wedding dress brand, Biancarosa by Haruka.

In March 2008, she married writer Keiichiro Hirano.

In November 29, 2011, Haruka gave birth to her first child. She later gave birth to another child in August 2013.

== Filmography ==
=== TV series ===
Year	Title	Network	Notes
2014	Ippuku!	TBS	Regular navigator

=== Magazines ===
Title	Notes
Story	
Grace	Cover
Domani	Cover
Katei Gahō	
Kimono Salon	
Karaku	
Mrs	

=== Advertisements ===
Title	Notes
Kanebo Cosmetics "Towani"	
Kanebo Cosmetics "Akai Bihaku"	
Suntory	
Mitsubishi Electric	
Japan Tobacco	
