= Dictionary of Old English =

Old English dictionary published in Canada

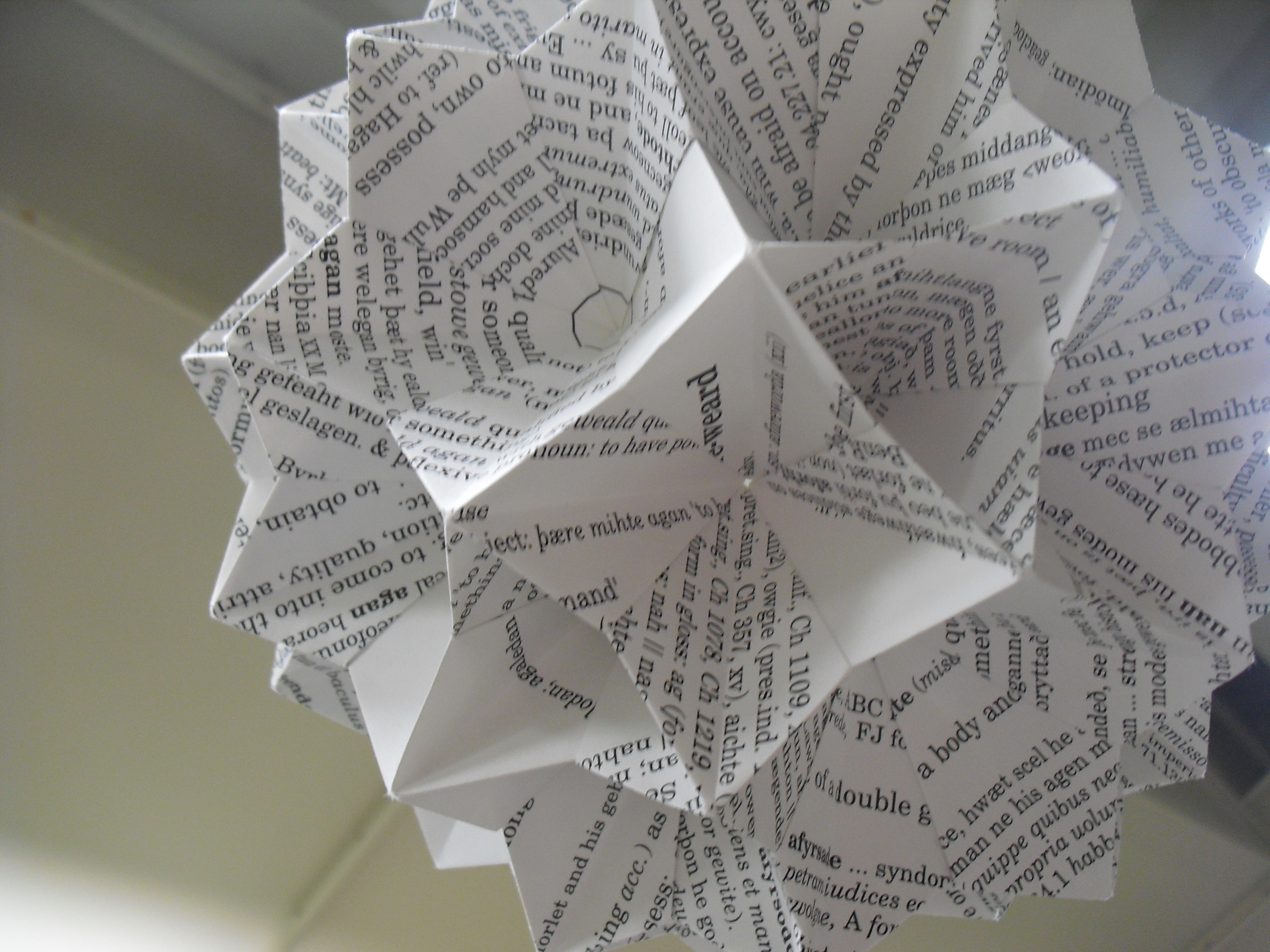
Hanging decoration made out of discarded research materials, in the Dictionary of Old English main workroom.

The Dictionary of Old English (DOE) is a dictionary of the Old English language, published by the Centre for Medieval Studies, University of Toronto, under the direction of Angus Cameron, Ashley Crandell Amos, Antonette diPaolo Healey, Haruko Momma, Robert Getz and Stephen Pelle.

The DOE complements the Oxford English Dictionary's comprehensive survey of modern English, the Middle English Dictionary's comprehensive survey of Middle English, and the Scottish Language Dictionaries surveys of Scots.

The dictionary is still under production. With the publication of the entries under I in September 2018, the entries for letters A-I of the 24-letter Old English alphabet have been published. Since the dictionary has no entry for J and published the two entries for K at the same time as the I entries, it has technically covered A-K, and the next letter to be published will be L.

The dictionary has made extensive use of digital technology, and is based on a corpus of at least one copy of every known surviving text written in Old English.

== History ==
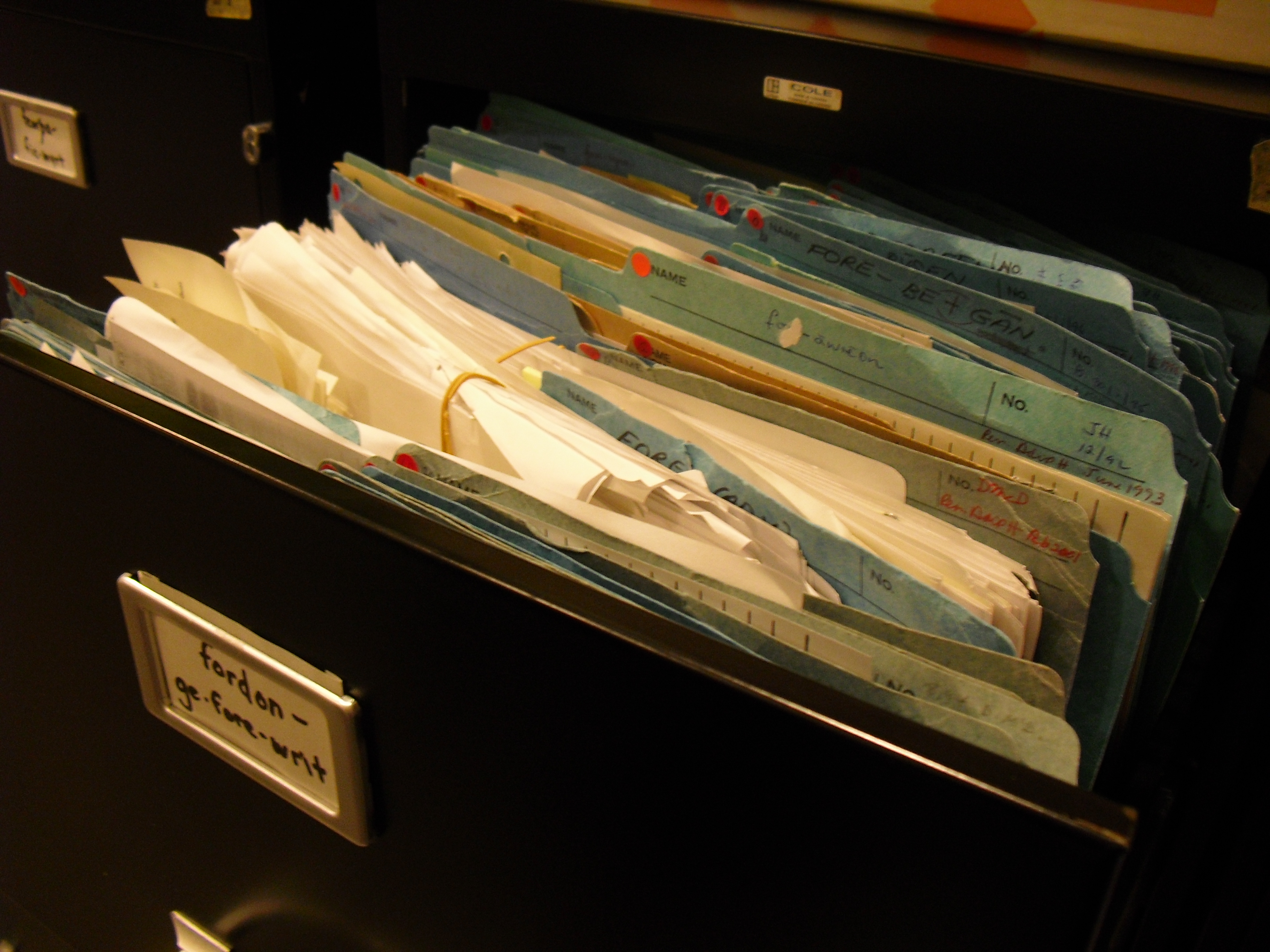
Archived files of research materials from the creation of the Dictionary of Old English.

The dictionary was conceived in 1968 as a replacement for the Bosworth–Toller Anglo-Saxon Dictionary, which had been compiled at a time when both the study of the Old English language and lexicographical techniques were less advanced. From the outset, the editors were interested in the potential application of computer technology to the task of compiling the dictionary, and in basing the dictionary text on a corpus. A dictionary plan was published in 1973. It was originally anticipated that work on the dictionary would begin in 1976 and the dictionary would begin appearing in fascicles shortly thereafter.

The first fascicle was not published until 1986, and covered words beginning with the letter D. The letter G was reached in 2008. As of March 2015 the entries for 8 of the 24 letters of the Old English alphabet, A-H were published, with over 60% of the total entries written.

The letter I was released in September 2018, which also included the two entries for the letter K.

== Availability ==
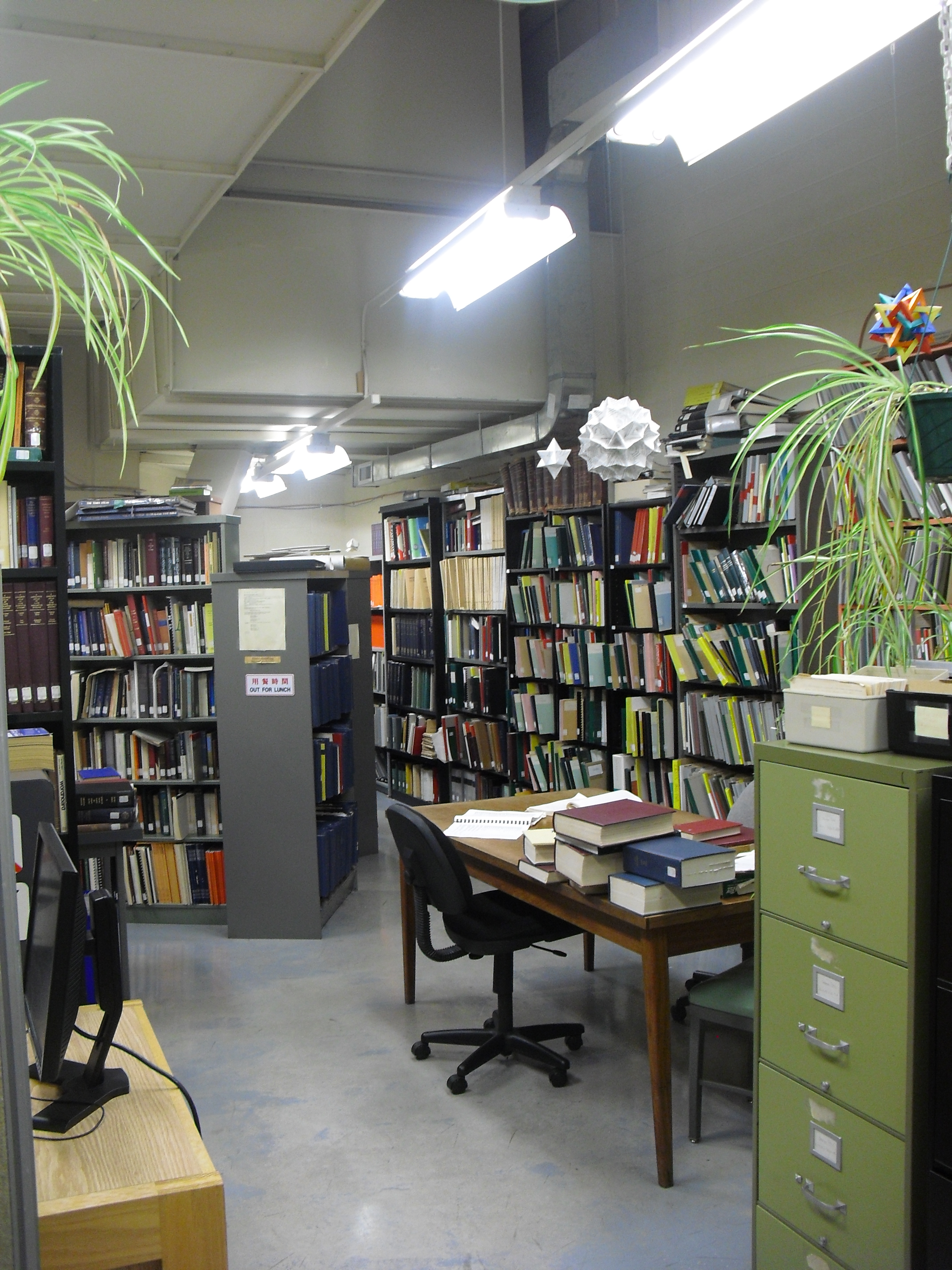
The Dictionary of Old English main workroom, 2011

The dictionary is available in 3 formats:

- Dictionary of Old English: A to I online This site offers a limited number of free searches per year, then charges apply. Registration is required.
- Dictionary of Old English: A to H on CD-ROM
- Dictionary of Old English: A to G on microfiche

The corpus is available in 2 formats:

- Dictionary of Old English Web Corpus
- Dictionary of Old English in Electronic Form

The computerized corpus (old version) is available to download on request from the University of Oxford Text Archive, free for use in education and research:

- Dictionary of Old English Corpus in Electronic Form (DOEC)
