= Sun Yat-sen House (Nanjing) =

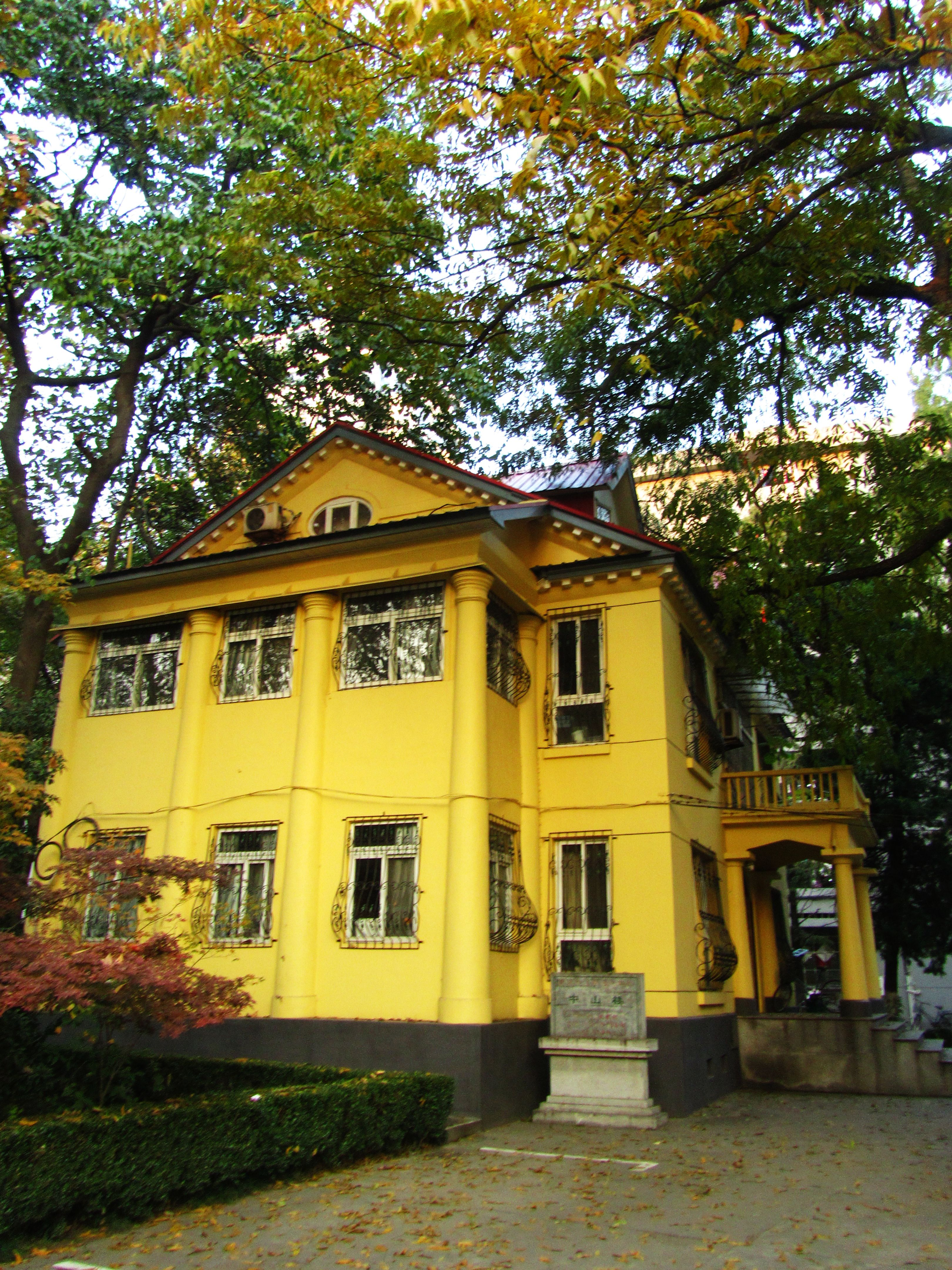
Sun Yat-sen House

Sun Yat-sen House (Chinese: 中山樓; pinyin: Zhongshan Lou) is located in the South Garden of Gulou Campus of Nanjing University in Nanjing, Jiangsu, China. It's said that Sun Yat-sen, the first president (provisional president) of the Republic of China, lived there in 1910s.

The house has been called Zhongshan House (Sun Yat-sen House) for long, but it's unknown from when. It's included in the list of Nanjing Historic Preservations in 2006 and Nanjing Key Modern Historic Buildings in 2010. In the book "My Grandfather: Sun Yat-sen" published in 2001 written by Sun Huifang, a photo of the house is shown with the note "official mansion of Sun Yat-sen".

The place became part of campus of Nanjing University (Nanda) after 1952. "To prove it, original record or image material must be found, or it's only a legend." said Zhu Baoqin, a professor of history at Nanjing University. After research, Sun Huifang, the granddaughter of Sun Yat-sen, considered the house to be the house Sun Yat-sen lived when he was provisional president in the first year of Republic of China (1912). Sun Yat-sen once lived at Changjiang Road in Nanjing when he was provisional president.
