= 1911 Revolution =

End of Qing dynasty in China

1911 Revolution 辛亥革命
- Part of the anti-Qing movements
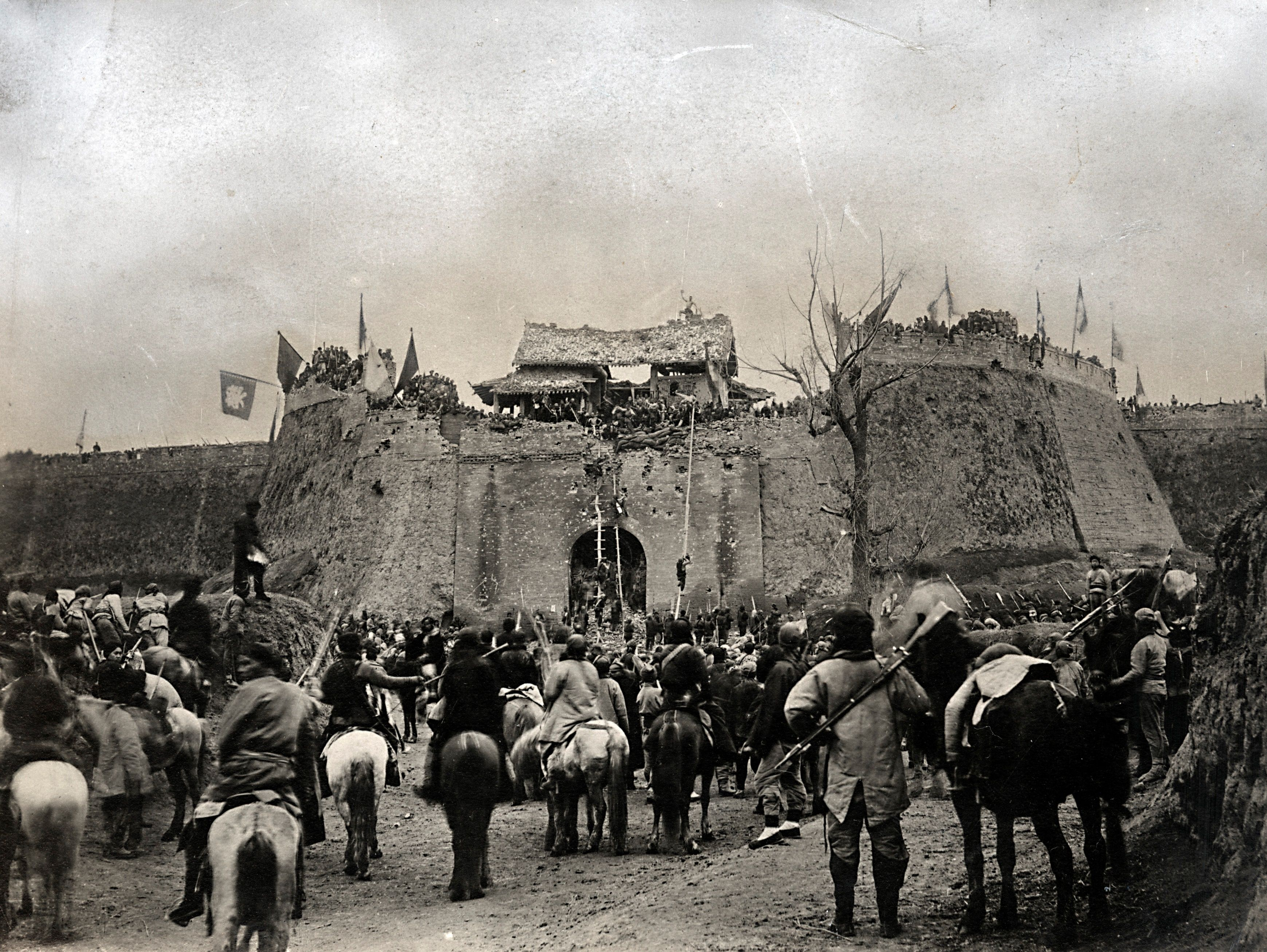
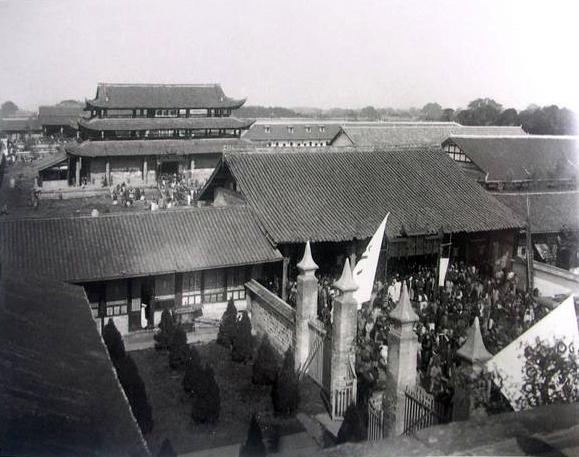
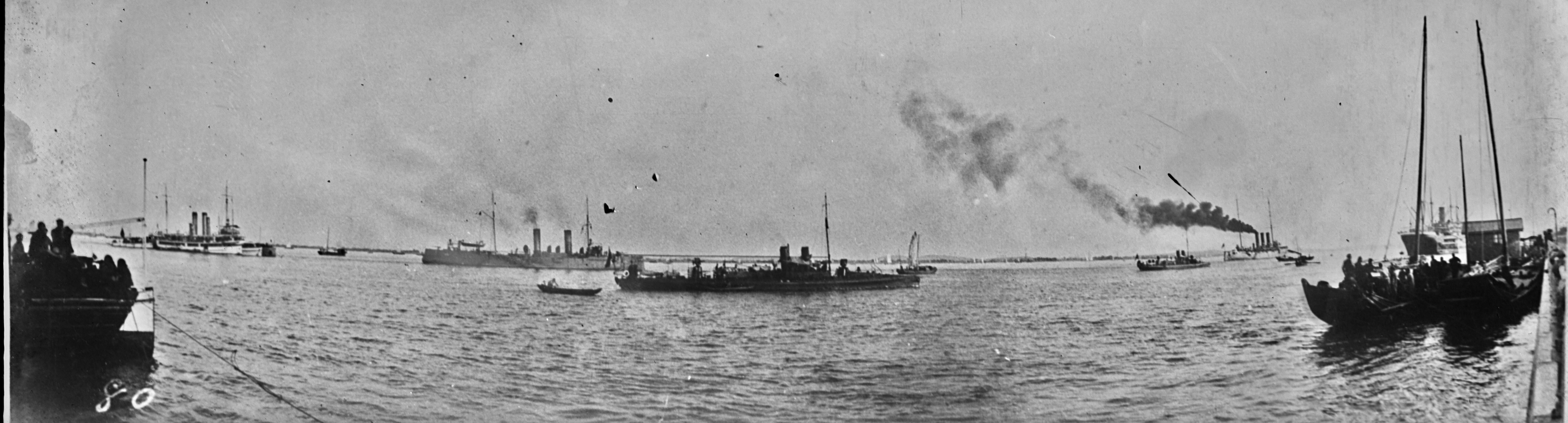
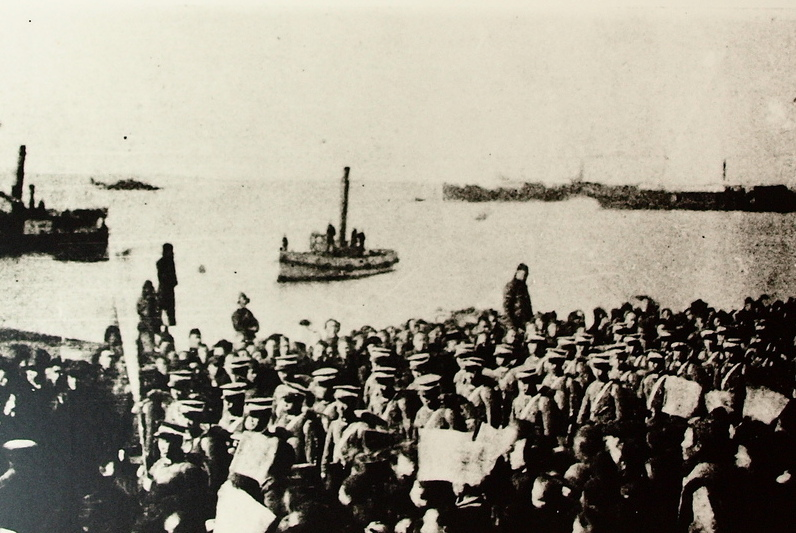
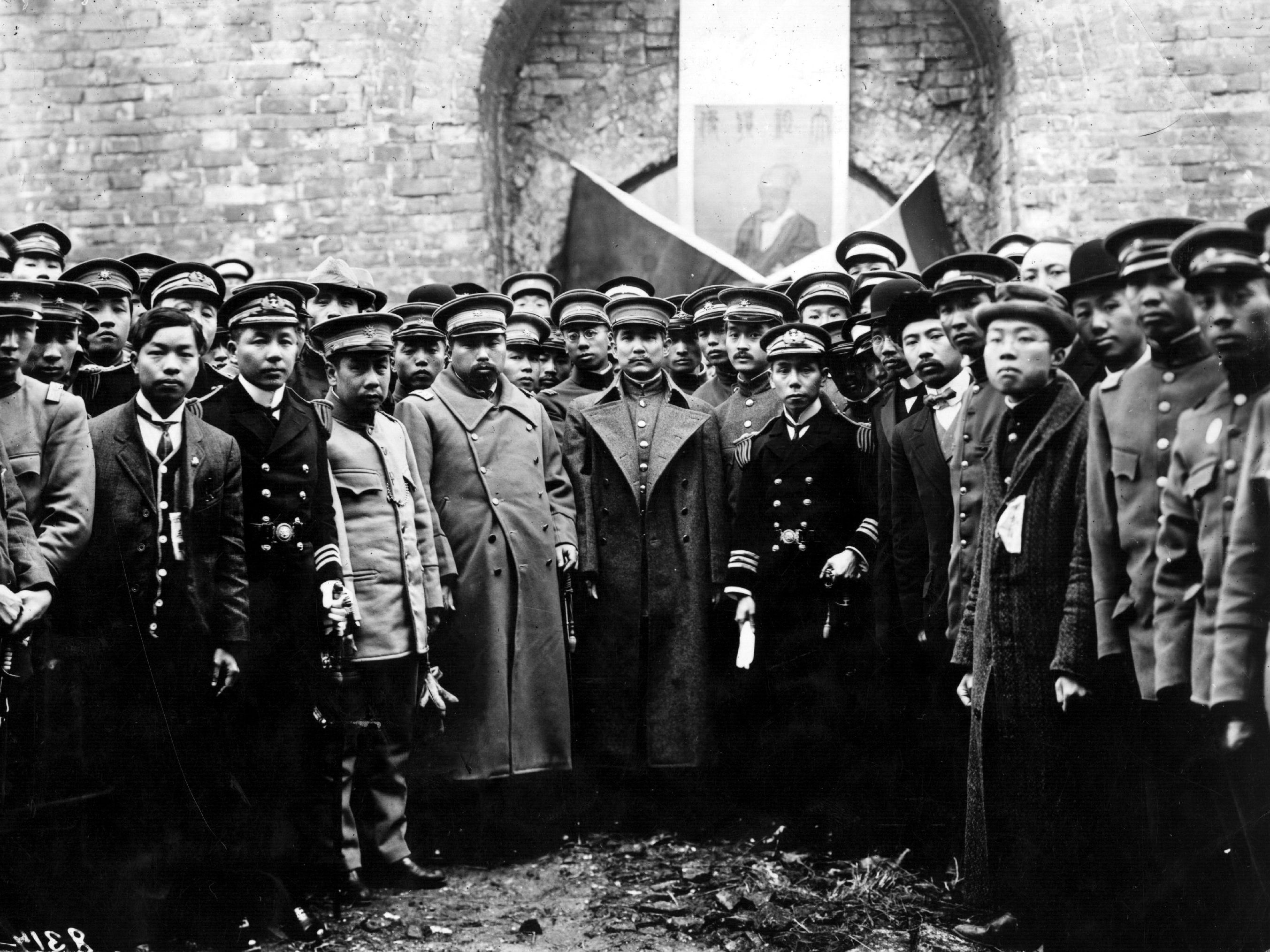
- From top to bottom, left to right: Qing loyalist army attacked on Qianzhou; Military government established in Chengdu; Battles near Wuchang; Revolutionary forces landed at Chefoo; Sun Yat-sen and his cabinet visited Xiao Mausoleum, proclaiming the restoration of the nation
Date	10 October 1911 – 12 February 1912 (4 months and 2 days)
Location	China
Result	Revolutionary victory
Territorial changes	Qing dynasty is overthrown; end of Imperial China; Republic of China established; Tibet, Mongolia, and Uryankhay become independent

Belligerents
Qing dynasty; Loyalist military; Royalist Party	Revolutionaries: Tongmenghui; Yellow Sand Society; Provincial military governments; Shanxi; Sichuan; Yunnan; Gelaohui; Tiandihui; Republic of China (from 1912); (Tibet) Tibetan militias; (Bogd Khanate of Mongolia) Mongolian nationalists; Tannu Uriankhai

Commanders and leaders
Xuantong Emperor; (Qing dynasty) Empress Dowager Longyu; (Qing dynasty) Zaifeng, Prince Chun; (Qing dynasty) Yuan Shikai; (Qing dynasty) Ma Anliang; (Qing dynasty) Yang Zengxin; (Qing dynasty) Zhao Erfeng; (Qing dynasty) Ma Qi	Sun Yat-sen; Huang Xing; Li Yuanhong; Song Jiaoren; Chen Qimei; Cai E; Hu Hanmin

Strength
(Qing dynasty) 200,000	100,000

Casualties and losses
(Qing dynasty) est. 170,000	est. 50,000

1911 Revolution
- Chinese: 辛亥革命
- Literal meaning: "Xinhai revolution"
Transcriptions
Standard Mandarin
- Hanyu Pinyin: Xīnhài gémìng
- Bopomofo: ㄒㄧㄣ ㄏㄞˋ ㄍㄜˊ ㄇㄧㄥˋ
- Wade–Giles: Hsin^{1}-hai^{4} ko^{2}-ming^{4}
- Tongyong Pinyin: Sin-hài gé-mìng
- IPA: [ɕín.xâɪ kɤ̌.mîŋ]
Yue: Cantonese
- Yale Romanization: Sān-hoih gaak-mihng
- Jyutping: san1 hoi6 gaak3 ming6
- IPA: [sɐn˥ hɔj˨ kak̚˧ mɪŋ˨]
Southern Min
- Hokkien POJ: Sin-hāi kek-bēng

The 1911 Revolution, also known as the Xinhai Revolution or Hsinhai Revolution, culminated in the end of China's last imperial dynasty, the Qing dynasty, and led to the establishment of the Republic of China (ROC). The revolution was the culmination of a decade of agitation, revolts, and uprisings. Its success marked the end of Chinese monarchy, the 267-year reign of the Qing, over two millennia of imperial rule in China, and the beginning of China's early republican era.

The Qing had long struggled to reform the government and resist foreign aggression, but conservatives in the Qing court opposed the program of reforms after 1900 as too radical and reformers considered it too slow. Several factions, including underground anti-Qing groups, revolutionaries in exile, reformers who wanted to save the monarchy by modernizing it, and activists across the country debated how or whether to overthrow the Qing dynasty.

The flashpoint came on 10 October 1911 with the Wuchang Uprising, an armed rebellion by members of the New Army. Similar revolts then broke out spontaneously around the country, and revolutionaries in every province renounced the Qing dynasty. On 1 November 1911, the Qing court appointed Yuan Shikai (leader of the Beiyang Army) as prime minister, and he began negotiations with the revolutionaries.

In Nanjing, revolutionary forces created a provisional coalition government. On 1 January 1912, the Advisory Council declared the establishment of the Republic of China, with Sun Yat-sen, leader of the Tongmenghui, as President of the Republic of China. A brief civil war between the North and the South ended in compromise. Sun resigned in favor of Yuan, who would become president of the new national government if he could secure the abdication of the Qing emperor. The edict of abdication of the six-year-old Xuantong Emperor was promulgated on 12 February 1912. Yuan was sworn in as president on 10 March 1912.

In December 1915, Yuan restored the monarchy and proclaimed himself the Hongxian Emperor, but the move was met with strong opposition by the population and the Army, leading to his abdication in March 1916 and the Republic's reinstatement. Yuan's failure to consolidate a legitimate central government before his death in June 1916 led to decades of political division and warlordism, including an attempt at imperial restoration of the Qing dynasty.

The name "Xinhai Revolution" derives from the traditional Chinese calendar, where "Xinhai" (辛亥) is the label corresponding to 1911 according to the sexagenary cycle. The governments of both the Republic of China and the People's Republic of China consider themselves the legitimate successors to the 1911 Revolution and honor the ideals of the revolution, including nationalism, republicanism, modernization of China, and national unity. 10 October is the National Day of the Republic of China on Taiwan, and the Anniversary of the 1911 Revolution in China.

== Background ==
=== Tension between Manchu and Han people ===
After the Manchu aristocracy came to rule the China, they adopted a policy of placing the Manchus first (首崇滿洲) to govern China, producing a complex and enduring ethnic conflict with the Han Chinese. Throughout the Qing dynasty's 268 years of rule, anti-Manchu sentiment never entirely disappeared. Early Qing Han Chinese thinkers such as Gu Yanwu and Wang Fuzhi repeatedly advocated the idea of overthrowing the Qing and restoring the Ming. Although their ideas did not bring about the immediate collapse of Qing rule, the seeds of revolution retained a degree of vitality within underground organizations and secret societies. The various movements launched by Ming loyalists, the Revolt of the Three Feudatories, the activities of the Tiandihui, the White Lotus Rebellion, and the Taiping Heavenly Kingdom war all expressed a spirit of ethnic resistance, and the revolution led by Sun Yat-sen was rooted in these traditions.

Although the court publicly proclaimed that no distinction was drawn between Manchus and Han and that both were employed in staffing government offices, in reality the status of Manchus and Han was not equal. Before the Taiping revolution, key military and administrative posts were mostly held by Manchus, and even those positions allotted to Han Chinese could be filled by Manchus, whereas the Han had no such reciprocal privilege. After the 1890s, anti-Manchu sentiment rose again. The writings of the late-Ming loyalist elders became an important intellectual resource of the time. Although Wang Fuzhi wrote prolifically, he had little influence in the late Ming and early Qing, largely because it was the court's leading ministers—Hunan-Xiang literati such as Zeng Guofan and Guo Songtao—who strenuously championed him. In his Three Principles of the People, Sun Yat-sen wrote: "The Manchu conquest of China was a conquest of the majority by the minority, seeking to make use of the majority Chinese as their slaves," and "China has been completely subjugated twice already: once under the Yuan dynasty, and once under the Qing." He held that under the rule of the Qing government, the Han were nothing but four hundred million oppressed and discriminated-against subjects of a conquered nation. Feng Ziyou (馮自由) noted that in the early days of the Xingzhonghui, "the only propaganda tools used were a few standalone editions: the Record of Ten Days at Yangzhou, the Record of the Jiading Massacre, and selected reprints of the 'On the Ruler' and 'On the Minister' chapters from the Waiting for the Dawn." Huang Xing likewise recounted that his distant ancestor had, in the early Qing, written a testamentary injunction that the descendants of the Huang family should never serve as officials under the Qing. As China's perilous situation deepened after the Boxer Rebellion and student movements among those studying in Japan developed, the tide of anti-Manchu revolution rose ever higher and became difficult to contain.

=== Invasion by foreign powers ===
Heads of state of Qing China in the late 19th century

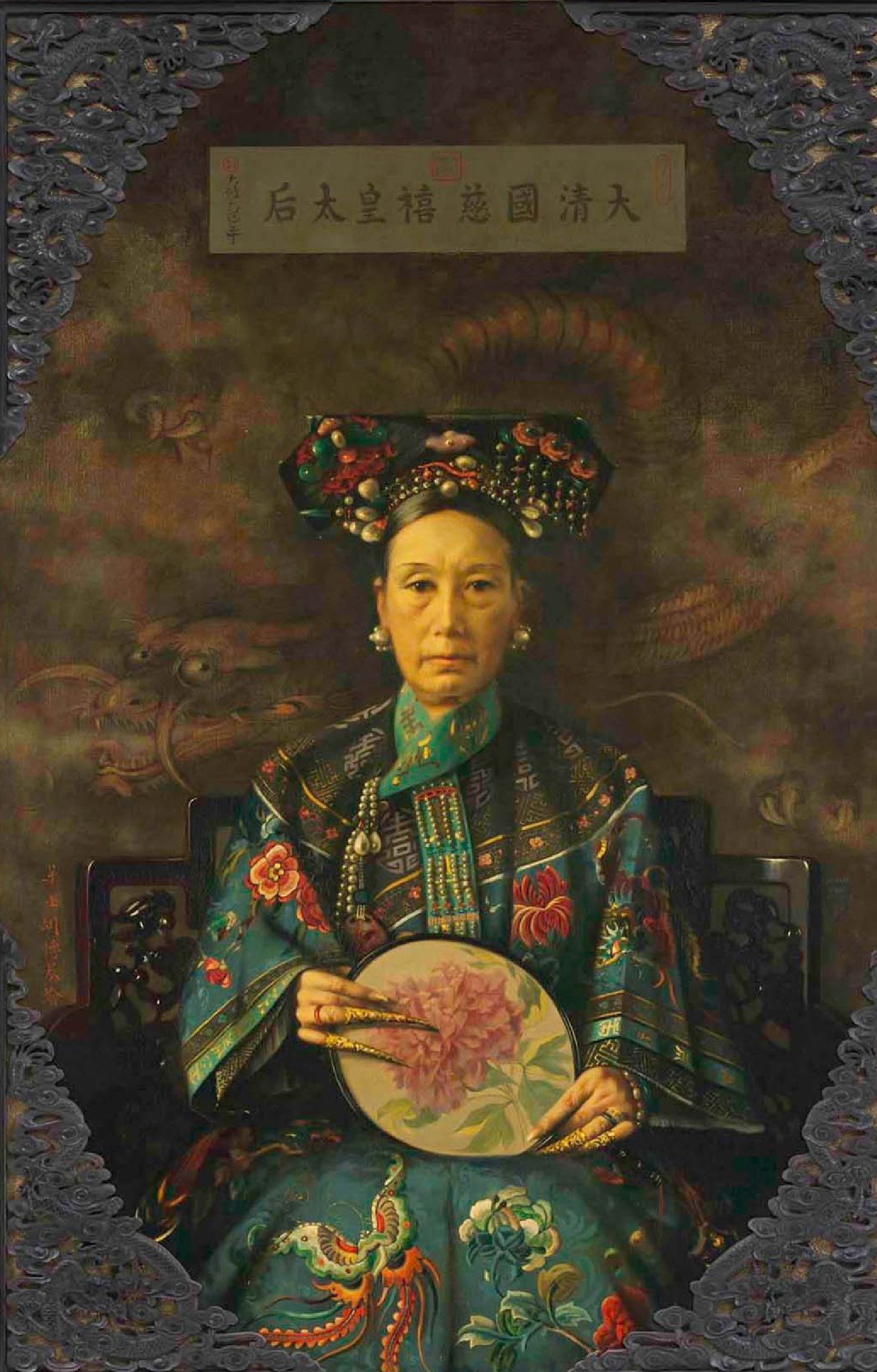
Empress Dowager Cixi (1835–1908), who titularly controlled court politics for 47 years

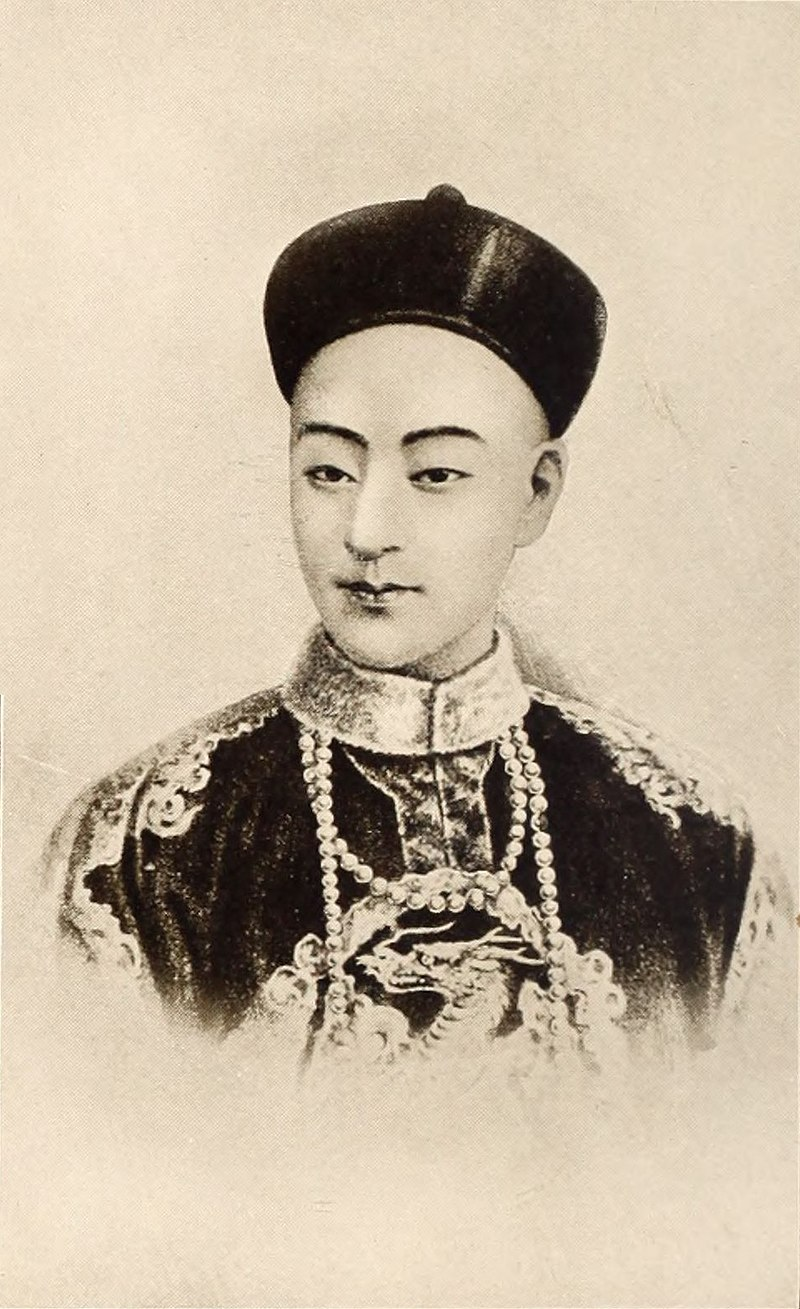
Guangxu Emperor (1871–1908), who ruled over the Qing dynasty from 1875 until his death

After suffering its first defeat by the West in the First Opium War in 1842, a conservative court culture constrained efforts to reform and did not want to cede authority to local officials. After its defeat in the Second Opium War in 1860, the Qing began efforts to modernize by adopting Western technologies through the Self-Strengthening Movement. In the wars against the Taiping (1851–1864), Nian (1851–1868), Yunnan (1856–1873) and Dungan (1862–1877), the court came to rely on armies raised by local officials. After a generation of relative success in importing Western naval and weapons technology, the Chinese defeat to Imperial Japan in the First Sino-Japanese War in 1895 was all the more humiliating and convinced many of the need for institutional change. The court established the New Army under Yuan Shikai, and many concluded that Chinese society also needed to be modernized if technological and commercial advancements were to succeed.

=== An unsuccessful reform ===
Major reformers of Hundred Days' Reform and their desinations

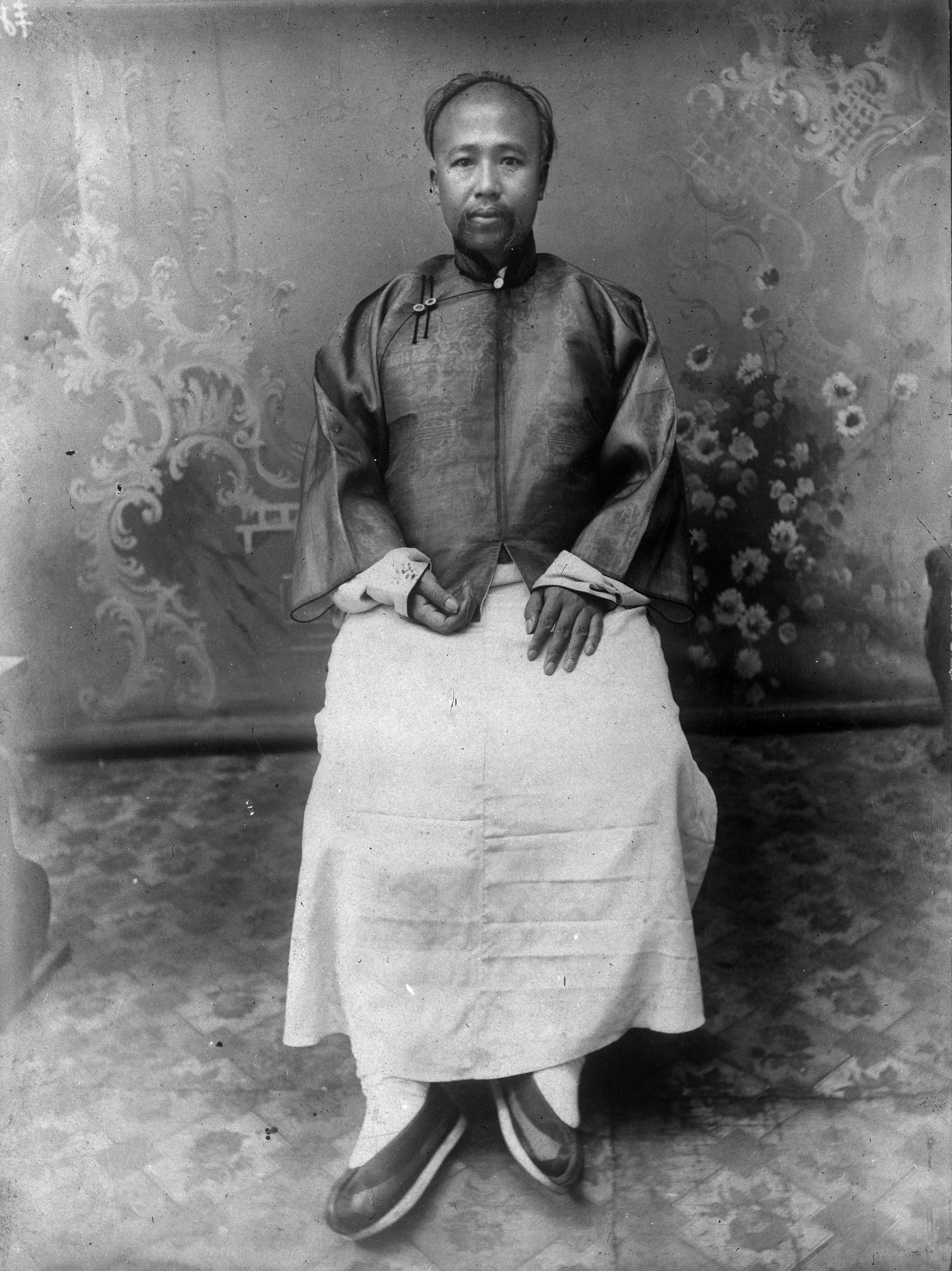
Kang Youwei (1858–1927), fled into exile and remained a royalist and supported restoring the last Qing emperor Puyi in 1917

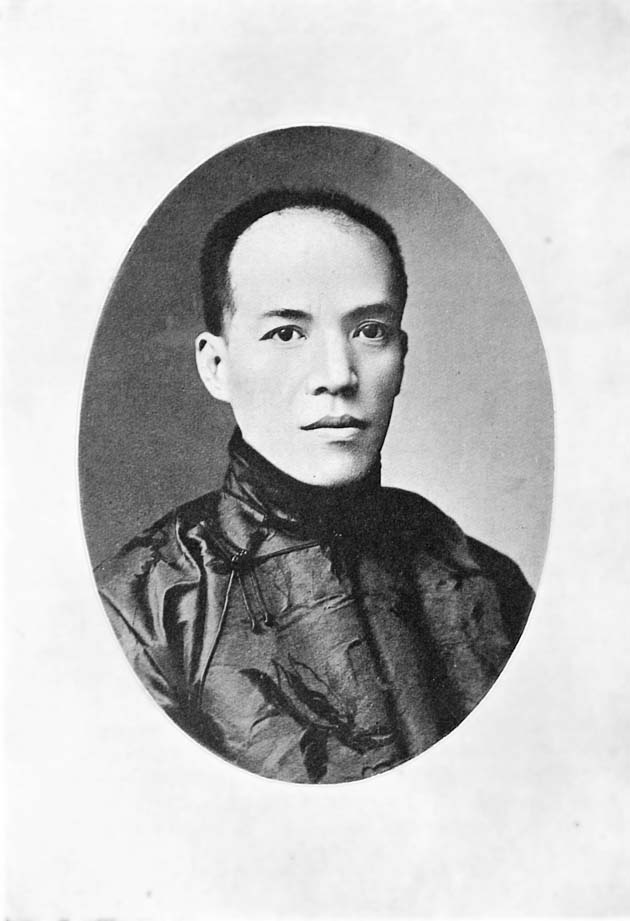
Liang Qichao (1873–1929), fled into exile, and later became the Minister of Justice of the Republic of China

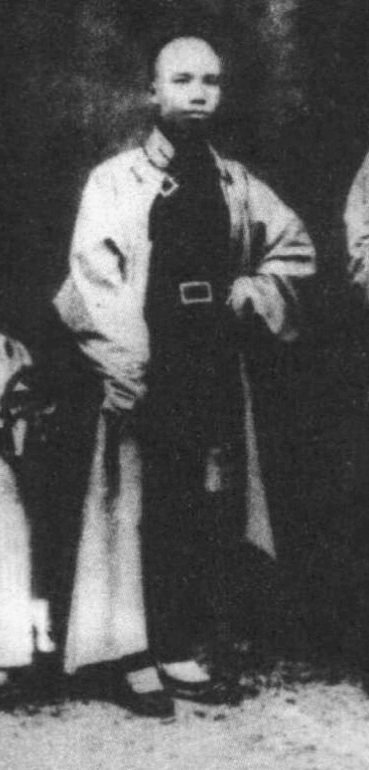
Tan Sitong (1865–1898), was executed together with other five advocates of the reform

In 1898, the Guangxu Emperor turned to reformers like Kang Youwei and Liang Qichao, who offered a program that was inspired in large part by the reforms in Japan. They proposed basic reform in education, military, and economy in the so-called Hundred Days' Reform. The reform was abruptly canceled by a conservative coup, led by Empress Dowager Cixi. The Emperor was put under house arrest in June 1898, where he remained until his death in 1908. The reformers Kang and Liang exiled themselves to avoid being executed. The Empress Dowager controlled policy until her death in 1908, with support from officials such as Yuan. Attacks on foreigners and Chinese Christians in the Boxer Rebellion by Chinese nationalists, which was encouraged by the Empress Dowager, prompted another foreign invasion of Beijing in 1900.

After the Allies imposed a punitive settlement in 1901, the Qing court carried out basic fiscal and administrative reforms, including local and provincial elections. The moves did not secure trust or wide support among political activists. Many of them like Zou Rong felt strong anti-Manchu prejudice and blamed the Qing for China's troubles. Kang Youwei and Liang Qichao formed the Emperor Protection Society in an attempt to restore the emperor, but others, such as Sun Yat-sen organized revolutionary groups to overthrow the dynasty, rather than reform it. They could operate only in secret societies and underground organizations, in foreign concessions, or exile overseas but created a following among overseas Chinese in North America, Southeast Asia and within China, even in the new armies. Sun Yat-sen believed that China needed to transition from an absolute monarchy to a democratic republic and believed that a revolution was the only way to modernize China and defend its sovereignty from Western colonial powers and Japan. Following the death of the Guangxu Emperor and Cixi in 1908, the throne was inherited by the two-year-old Xuantong Emperor, with Prince Chun as a regent. The prince continued the reform path of Cixi, but conservative Manchu elements in the court opposed it, which caused further support for revolutionaries.

== Revolutionary movements and debates ==
=== Early activities led by Sun ===
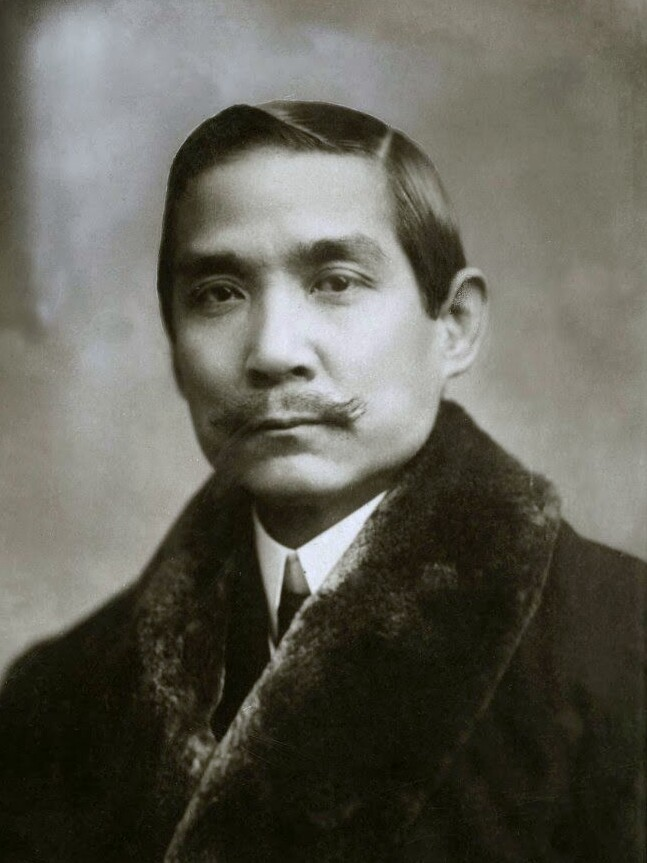
Sun Yat-sen was the first advocate of political revolution and renowned highly as regarded as the "Forerunner of the Revolution" (革命先行者) by both nationalists and communists; here is picture taken when he was in exile in London in 1896

Many revolutionaries and groups wanted to overthrow the Qing government to re-establish the Han-led government. The earliest revolutionary organizations were founded outside of China, such as Yeung Ku-wan's Furen Literary Society, which was created in British Hong Kong in 1890. There were 15 members, including Tse Tsan-tai, who made political satire such as "The Situation in the Far East", one of the first manhua, and who later became one of the core founders of the South China Morning Post.

Sun's Revive China Society was established in Honolulu in 1894, the main purpose being raising funds for revolutions. The two organizations merged in 1894.

=== Revolutionary organizations ===
==== Smaller groups ====
The Huaxinghui (China Revival Society) was founded in 1904 by the notables Huang Xing, Zhang Shizhao, Chen Tianhua, Sun Yat-sen, Song Jiaoren, and 100 others. Its motto was "Take one province by force, and inspire the other provinces to rise."

The Guangfuhui (Restoration Society) was also founded in 1904 in Shanghai, by Cai Yuanpei. Other notable members included Zhang Binglin and Tao Chengzhang. Despite professing the anti-Qing cause, the Guangfuhui was highly critical of Sun Yat-sen. One of the most famous female revolutionaries was Qiu Jin, who fought for women's rights and was also from the Guangfuhui.

The Gelaohui (Elder Brother Society) was another group, with Zhu De, Wu Yuzhang, Liu Zhidan (劉志丹) and He Long. The revolutionary group would eventually develop a strong link with the later Chinese Communist Party.

The Tiandihui (Heaven and Earth Society) were groups of secretive, anti-Manchu fraternities provided the vital manpower, military networks and localized uprisings that ultimately toppled the Qing Dynasty. Originally formed in the 17th century as a network to oppose the ruling Qing and restore the Han Chinese Ming dynasty, the Tiandihui operated on blood oaths and the rallying cry "Oppose Qing, restore Ming" (Fan Qing Fu Ming). By the early 20th century, the anti-Qing sentiment was easily adapted by Republican revolutionaries into a modern nationalist movement aimed at stripping the Manchus of power and returning China to the Han majority. Sun Yat-sen recognized that modern, reform-minded intellectuals lacked the military might or broad grassroots reach required to fight the imperial state. To bridge this gap, he actively courted secret societies and even joined the Tiandihui's overseas branch in Hawaii (the Hongmen). He utilized these deeply established, underground networks to smuggle weapons, raise funds from the overseas Chinese diaspora and recruit guerrilla fighters for his early, abortive uprisings in southern China.

==== Tongmenghui ====
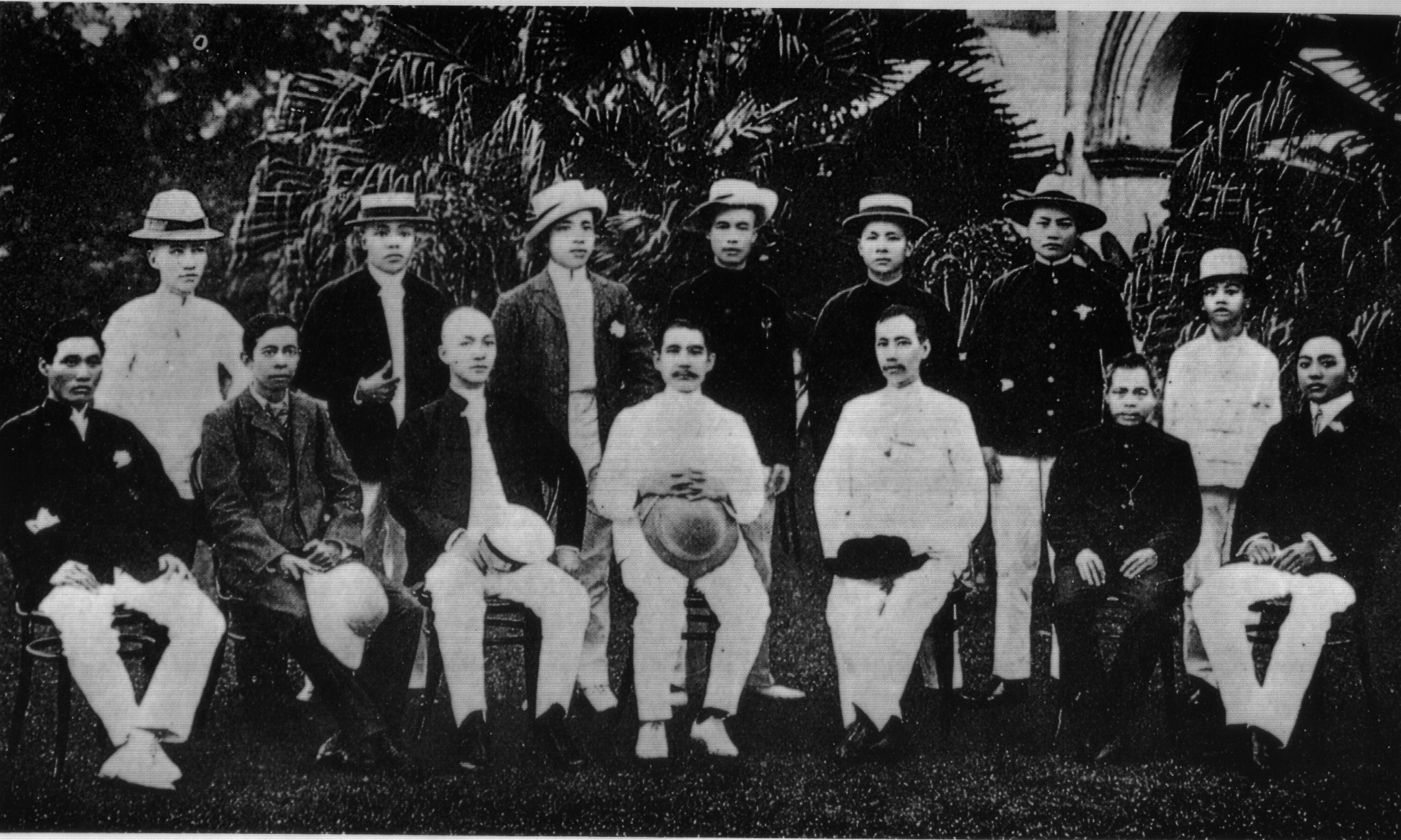
Sun Yat-sen with members of the Singaporean Branch of Tongmenghui

Sun Yat-sen successfully united the Revive China Society, the Huaxinghui, and the Guangfuhui and established the unified Tongmenghui (United League) in August 1905 in Tokyo. It had loose organizations distributed across and outside China. Sun Yat-sen was the leader of the unified group. Other revolutionaries who worked with the Tongmenghui include Wang Jingwei and Hu Hanmin. When the Tongmenghui was established, more than 90% of the Tongmenghui members were between 17 and 26 years old. Some of the work in the era includes manhua publications such as the Journal of Current Pictorial.

==== Later groups ====
In February 1906, Rizhihui (日知會) also had many revolutionaries, including Sun Wu (孫武), Zhang Nanxian (張難先), He Jiwei and Feng Mumin. A nucleus of attendees at the conference evolved into the Tongmenghui's establishment in Hubei.

In July 1907, several members of the Tongmenghui in Tokyo advocated a revolution in the area of the Yangtze. Liu Quiyi (劉揆一), Jiao Dafeng (焦達峰), Zhang Boxiang (張伯祥) and Sun Wu (孫武) established the Gongjinhui (共進會). In January 1911, the revolutionary group Zhengwu Xueshe (振武學社) was renamed as Wenxueshe (Literary Society) (文學社). Jiang Yiwu (蔣翊武) was chosen as the leader. Both organizations would play a major role during the Wuchang Uprising.

Many young revolutionaries supported anarchism in China. In Tokyo, Liu Shipei proposed to overthrow the Manchus and return to Chinese classical values. In Paris, well-connected young intellectuals, Li Shizhen, Wu Zhihui and Zhang Renjie, agreed with Sun's revolutionary program and joined the Tongmenghui but argued that simply replacing one government with another would not be progress. They believed that fundamental cultural change and a revolution in family, gender, and social values would remove the need for government and coercion. Zhang Ji and Wang Jingwei were among the anarchists, who defended assassination and terrorism as means to awaken the people to revolution, but others insisted that education was the only justifiable strategy. Important anarchists included Cai Yuanpei. Zhang Renjie gave Sun major financial help. Many of the anarchists would later assume high positions in the Kuomintang.

=== Debates ===
==== Revolutionaries and Han-nationalists ====
Many revolutionaries promoted anti-Qing and anti-Manchu sentiments and revived memories of conflict between the minority Manchu and the majority Han Chinese from the late Ming dynasty (1368–1644). Leading intellectuals were influenced by books that had survived from the final years of the Ming dynasty, the last Han Chinese dynasty. In 1904, Sun Yat-sen announced that his organization's goal was "to expel the Tatar barbarians, to revive Zhonghua, establish a republic, and distribute land equally among the people". (驅除韃虜, 恢復中華, 創立民國, 平均地權). Many underground groups promoted the ideas of "resist Qing and restore the Ming" (反清復明), which had been around since the days of the Taiping Rebellion. Others, such as Zhang Binglin, spread calls to "slay the Manchus" (興漢滅胡) and the concept of "Anti-Manchuism" (排滿主義).

==== Qing loyalists ====
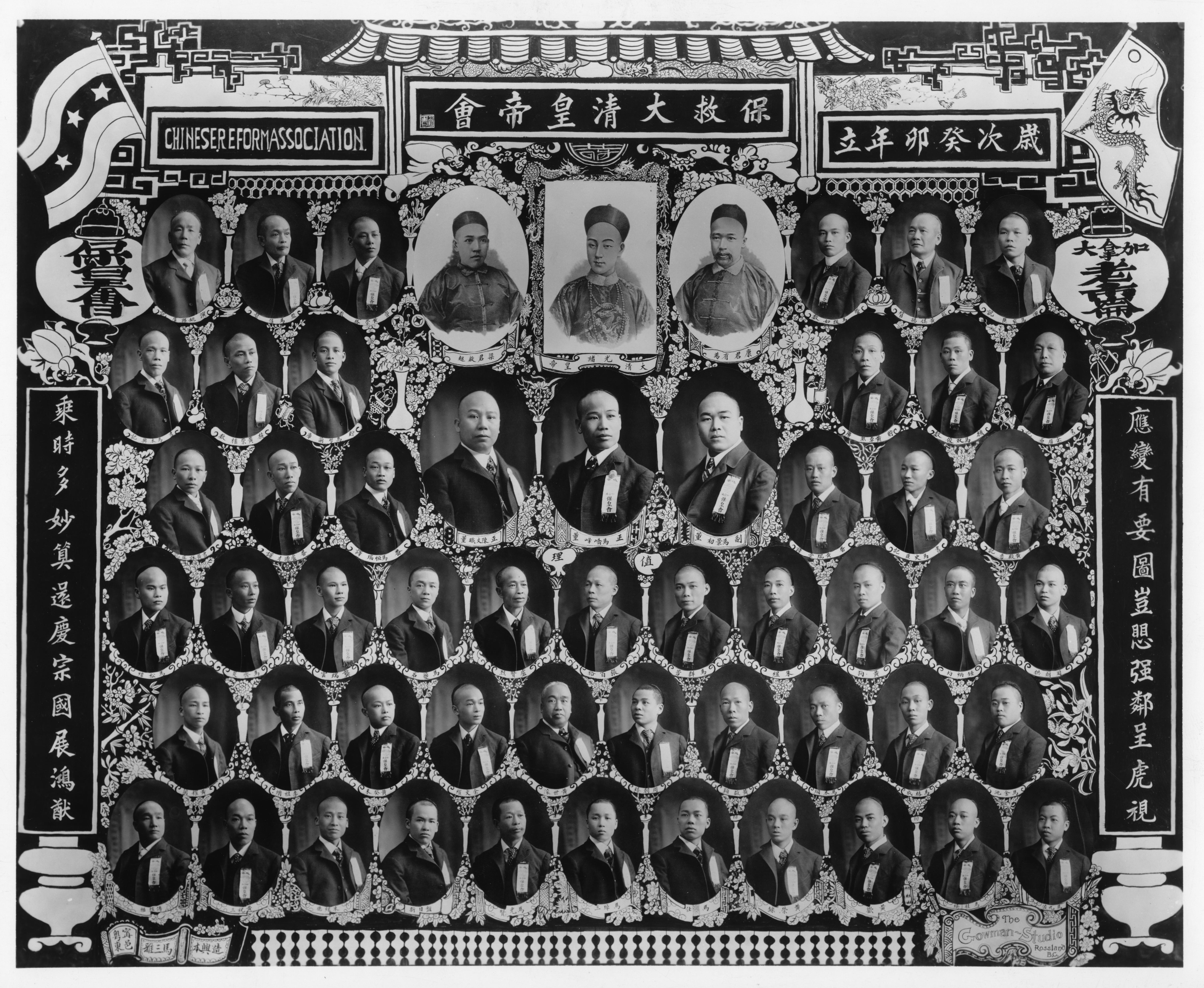
Members of loyalist Canadian Branch of Chinese Empire Reform Association, 1903

Sun Yat-sen and the Chinese Revolutionary Alliance did not find their revolutionary activities in the Malaya region smooth sailing. Because Britain maintained diplomatic relations with the Qing Empire, the consulates that the Qing established in Singapore and Penang became an obstacle to revolutionary activity. In addition, the Qing government dispatched diplomats and envoys to visit various parts of Malaya, where they were welcomed by the local Chinese. The main purpose of these officials' visits was to call upon the local Chinese to pledge loyalty to the Qing, and some even sold official titles as a means of winning over the local Chinese. Hu Hanmin, head of the Nanyang General Branch of the Tongmenghui, described the Nanyang overseas Chinese in his work Nanyang and the Chinese Revolution: "One had only to have served as some petty official under the Manchus and go boasting to Nanyang, saying: 'For three generations my family were high officials of the first rank, and I too held a distinguished post, with a grand button of rank!'—and with such boasting he could instantly stir the overseas Chinese into revering him." From this it can be seen that the Chinese in the Malaya region at that time were conservative in their thinking. This conservative mindset also caused the call for constitutional monarchy made by overseas constitutionalist leaders such as Kang Youwei, who were active in the region, to find a response among the local Chinese.

Because the overseas constitutionalists led by Kang Youwei and the revolutionaries led by Sun Yat-sen differed greatly in their conceptions of a new political system, a great debate erupted when these two factions—along with even more conservative figures—met in Nanyang. Both the constitutionalists and the revolutionaries founded their own newspapers, in which they debated fiercely over the issues of constitutional monarchy versus democratic revolution. In the debate, the upper strata of local Chinese society were supporters of the constitutionalists, upholding the constitutionalist cause in order to keep their own property unaffected and to protect the interests they had already gained. Meanwhile, some of the lower and middle classes—such as shop clerks, small merchants, cultural and educational figures, miners, rubber tappers, peddlers, and other common folk, as well as the members of the sworn brotherhoods—were supporters of the revolutionaries. The war of words first began in Singapore. The Lat Pau supported the Qing government, and newspapers supporting the constitutionalists included the Nanyang Union Times (南洋總匯新報), the Sing Po, and the Thien Nan Shin Pao (天南新報). On the revolutionary side, support came successively from the Thoe Lam Jit Poh (圖南日報), the Chong Shing Yit Pao, the Sing Chew Morning Post (星洲晨報), and the Nan Kiao Jit Pao, among others. At the time, the war of words between the Lat Pau and both the Chong Shing Yit Pao and the Nanyang Union Times became the first war of words among the Chinese-language newspapers of Nanyang. As for Malaya, in 1906 Huang Jinqing founded the Penang Sin Poe (檳城日報), the first newspaper established by the revolutionaries in Penang. On 10 December 1910, Sun Yat-sen, Chen Xinzheng (陳新政), Zhuang Yin'an (莊銀安), and others founded the Kwong Wah Yit Poh in Penang. The Kwong Wah Yit Poh was not only the most important organ of the revolutionaries in Malaya, but is also the longest-running Chinese-language daily in the history of Malaysian journalism and indeed in the history of the Chinese-language press worldwide. The two characters "Kwong Wah" (光華) mean "to bring glory to China", and were personally chosen by Sun Yat-sen.

== Society and class ==
Many groups supported the 1911 Revolution, including students and intellectuals returning from abroad, participants of revolutionary organizations, overseas Chinese, soldiers of the new army, local gentry, and farmers.

=== Overseas Chinese ===
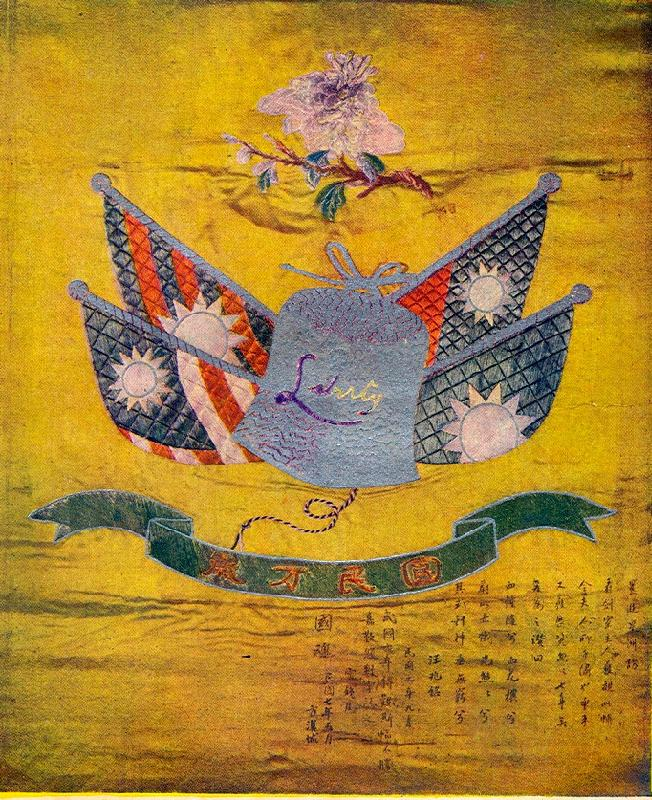
The proto-national flag designed by Sun Yat-sen in Wan Qing Yuan, Singapore, 1906. The banner reads "Long Live the People".

Assistance from the overseas Chinese was important in the 1911 Revolution. In 1894, the first year of the Revive China Society, the first meeting ever held by the group was held in the home of Ho Fon, an overseas Chinese who was the leader of the first Chinese Church of Christ. The overseas Chinese supported and actively participated in funding revolutionary activities, especially the Southeast Asian Chinese of British Malaya. Many of those groups were reorganized by Sun, who was referred to as the "father of the Chinese revolution".

=== Emerging intellectual class ===
The Qing government established new schools and encouraged students to study abroad as part of the Self-Strengthening movement. Many young people attended the new schools or went abroad to study in places like Japan. A new progressive class of intellectuals emerged from those students and contributed immensely to the 1911 Revolution. Besides Sun, key figures in the revolution, such as Huang Xing, Song Jiaoren, Hu Hanmin, Liao Zhongkai, Zhu Zhixin, and Wang Jingwei were all Chinese students in Japan. Some were young students like Zou Rong, known for writing Revolutionary Army, a book in which he supported the extermination of the Manchus and creating new revolutionary Han figures.

Before 1908, revolutionaries focused on coordinating those organizations in preparation for uprisings they would launch; the groups would provide most of the manpower needed to overthrow the Qing dynasty. After the 1911 Revolution, Sun recalled the days of recruiting support for the revolution and said, "The literati were deeply into the search for honors and profits, so they were regarded as having only secondary importance. By contrast, organizations like Sanhehui were able to sow widely the ideas of resisting the Qing and restoring the Ming."

=== Soldiers of the New Armies ===
Yuan rose to power in north China as the military leader of the Beiyang Army

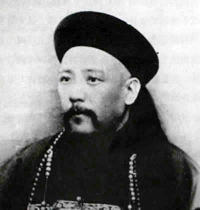
Yuan Shikai (1859–1916)

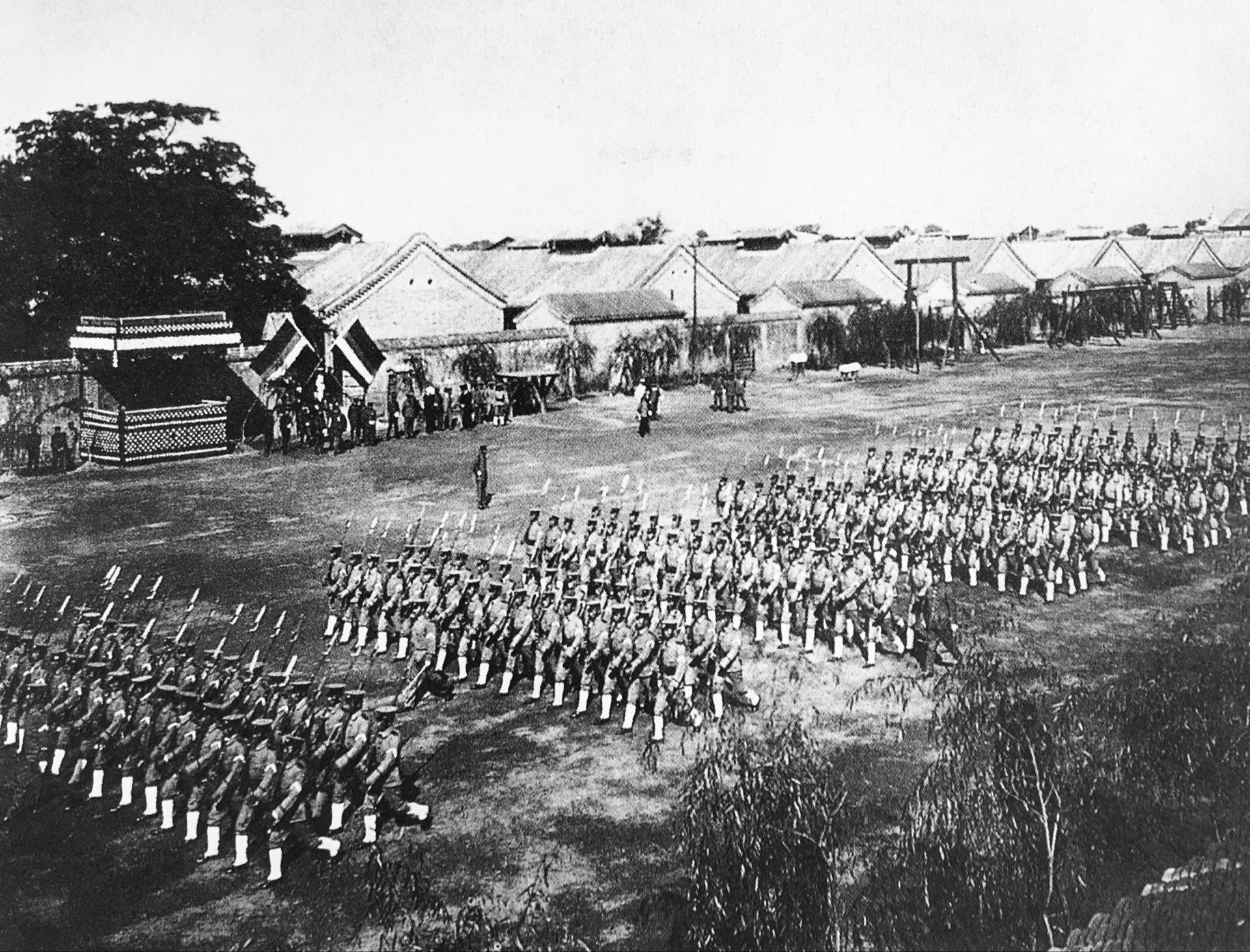
Beiyang Army being trained in Xiaozhan, Tianjin

The New Army was formed in 1901, after the Qing defeat in the First Sino-Japanese War, and was launched by a decree from eight provinces. The New Army troops were by far the best trained and equipped. Recruits were of a higher quality than the old army and received regular promotions. In 1908, the revolutionaries began to shift their call to the new armies. Sun Yat-sen and the revolutionaries infiltrated the New Army.

=== Gentry and businessmen ===
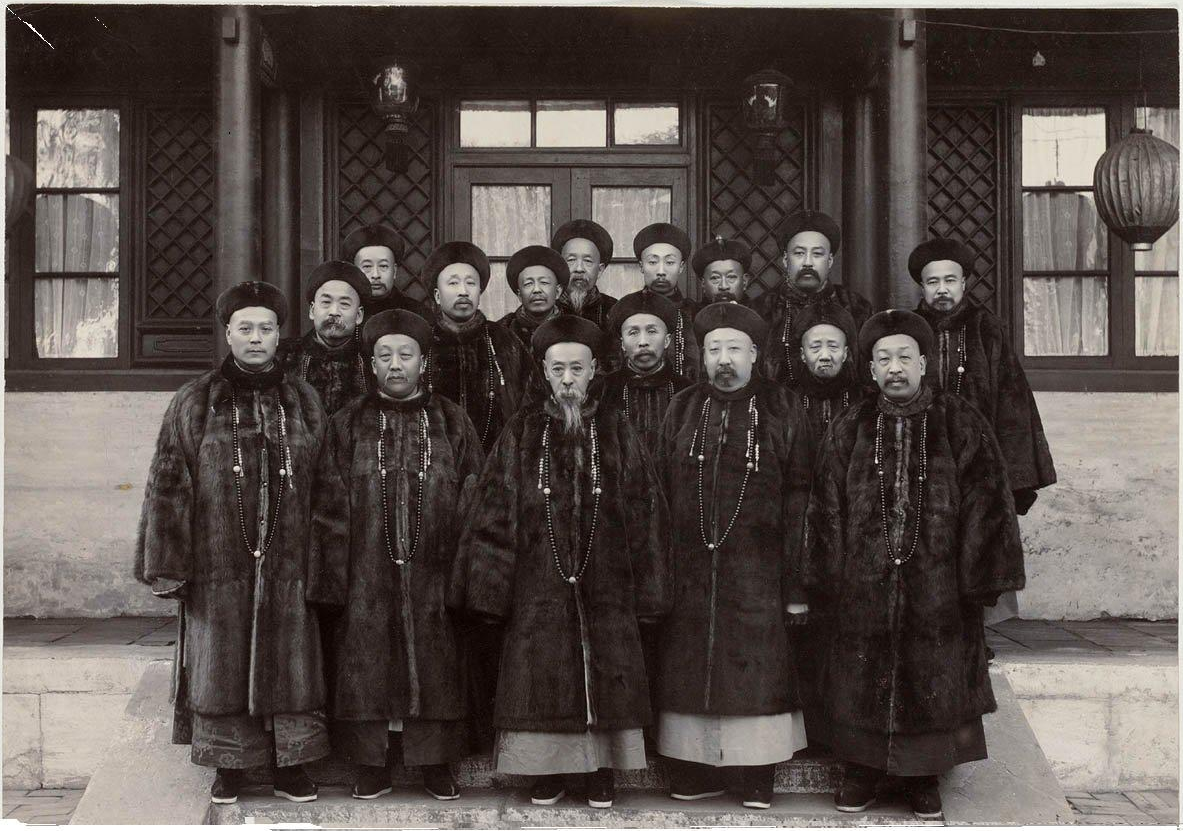
Prince Qing with royal cabinet members

The gentry's strength in local politics became apparent. From December 1908, the Qing government created some apparatus to allow the gentry and businessmen to participate in politics. Those middle-class people were originally supporters of constitutionalism. However, they became disenchanted when the Qing government created a cabinet with Prince Qing as prime minister. By early 1911, an experimental cabinet had thirteen members, nine of whom were Manchus selected from the imperial family.

=== Foreign supporters ===
Besides Chinese and overseas Chinese, some supporters and participants of the 1911 Revolution were foreigners, and the Japanese were the most active group. Some Japanese even became members of the Tongmenghui. Miyazaki Touten was the closest Japanese supporter; others included Heiyama Shu and Ryōhei Uchida. Homer Lea, an American, who became Sun Yat-sen's closest foreign advisor in 1910, supported his military ambitions. British soldier Rowland J. Mulkern also took part in the revolution. Some foreigners, such as the English explorer Arthur de Carle Sowerby, led expeditions to rescue foreign missionaries in 1911 and 1912.

The far right-wing Japanese ultra-nationalist Black Dragon Society supported Sun Yat-sen's activities against the Manchus and believed that overthrowing the Qing would help the Japanese take over the Manchu homeland and that Han Chinese would not oppose the takeover. Toyama believed that the Japanese could easily take over Manchuria and that Sun Yat-sen and other anti-Qing revolutionaries would not resist and help the Japanese take over and enlarge the opium trade in China, while the Qing was trying to destroy the opium trade. The Japanese Black Dragons supported Sun Yat-sen and anti-Manchu revolutionaries until the Qing collapsed. The far right-wing Japanese ultranationalist Gen'yōsha leader Tōyama Mitsuru supported anti-Manchu and anti-Qing revolutionary activities, including those organized by Sun and supported Japanese taking over Manchuria. The anti-Qing Tongmenghui was founded and based in exile in Japan, where many anti-Qing revolutionaries gathered.

The Japanese had been trying to unite anti-Manchu groups made out of Han people to take down the Qing. The Japanese helped Sun Yat-sen unite all anti-Qing, anti-Manchu revolutionary groups together, and there were Japanese like Tōten Miyazaki in of the anti-Manchu Tongmenghui revolutionary alliance. The Black Dragon Society hosted the Tongmenghui in its first meeting. The Black Dragon Society had very intimate, long term and influential relations with Sun Yat-sen, who sometimes passed himself off as Japanese. According to an American military historian, Japanese military officers were part of the Black Dragon Society. The Yakuza and Black Dragon Society helped arrange in Tokyo for Sun Yat-sen to hold the first Kuomintang meetings, and were hoping to flood China with opium and overthrow the Qing and deceive the Chinese into overthrowing the Qing to Japan's benefit. After the revolution was successful, the Japanese Black Dragons started infiltrating China and spreading opium. In 1932, the Black Dragons pushed for the takeover of Manchuria by Japan. Sun Yat-sen was married to a Japanese woman, Kaoru Otsuki.

== Prelude ==
Most of the central foci of the uprisings were connected with the Tongmenghui and Sun Yat-sen, including subgroups. Some uprisings involved groups that never merged with the Tongmenghui. Sun Yat-sen may have participated in 8–10 uprisings; all uprisings failed before the Wuchang Uprising.

=== 1900–1907 ===
First Guangzhou uprising

Flag of the First Guangzhou Uprising

In the spring of 1895, the Revive China Society, based in Hong Kong, planned the First Guangzhou Uprising. Lu Haodong was tasked with designing the revolutionaries' Blue Sky with a White Sun flag. On 26 October 1895, Yeung Ku-wan and Sun Yat-sen led Zheng Shiliang and Lu Haodong to Guangzhou, preparing to capture Guangzhou in one strike. However, the details of their plans were leaked to the Qing government. The government began to arrest revolutionaries, including Lu Haodong, who was later executed. The First Guangzhou Uprising was a failure. Under pressure from the Qing government, the government of Hong Kong banned the two men from the territory for five years. Sun went into exile; promoted revolution; and raised funds in Japan, the United States, Canada, and Britain. In 1901, following the Huizhou Uprising, Yeung Ku-wan was assassinated by Qing agents in Hong Kong. After his death, his family protected his identity by not putting his name on his tomb, just the number "6348".

Independence Army uprising

In 1900, after the Boxer Rebellion started, Tang Caichang (唐才常) and Tan Sitong of the previous Foot Emancipation Society organized the Independence Army. The Independence Army Uprising (自立軍起義) was planned to occur on 23 August 1900. Their goal was to overthrow Empress Dowager Cixi to establish a constitutional monarchy under the Guangxu Emperor. Their plot was discovered by the governors-general of Hunan and Hubei. About twenty conspirators were arrested and executed.

Huizhou uprising

Two prominent Qing figures representing Self-Strengthening Movement at the time

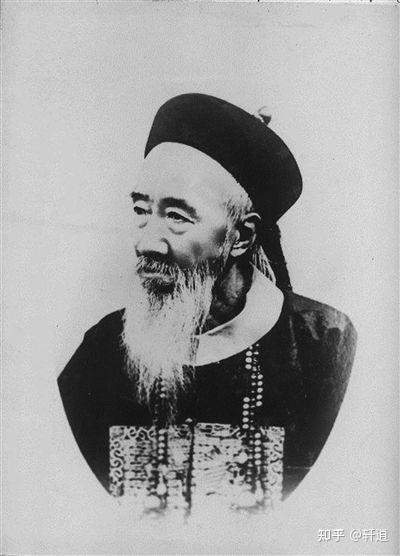
Zhang Zhidong

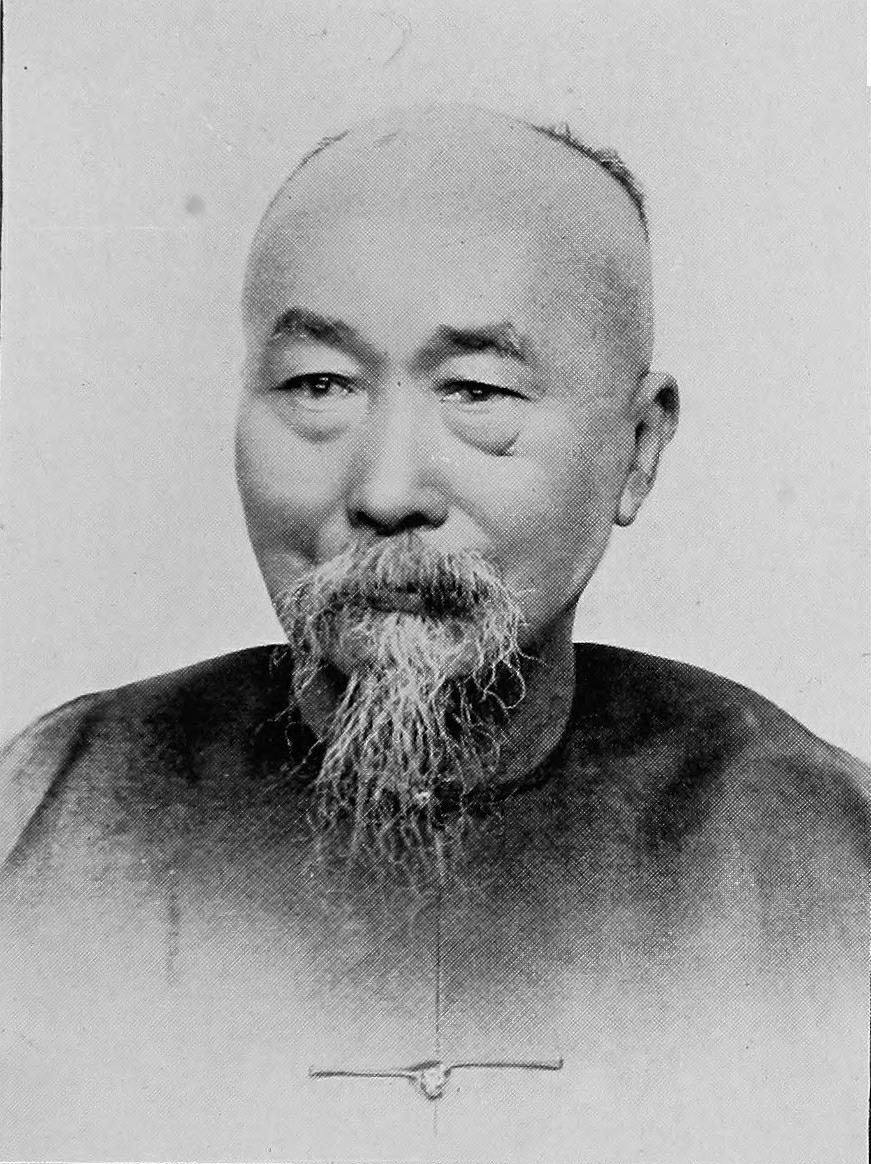
Li Hongzhang

On 8 October 1900, Sun ordered the launch of the Huizhou uprising (惠州起義). The revolutionary army was led by Zheng Shiliang and initially included 20,000 men, who fought for half a month. However, after Japanese Prime Minister Hirobumi Ito prohibited Sun Yat-sen from carrying out revolutionary activities in Taiwan, Zheng Shiliang had no choice but to order the army to disperse. Accordingly, the uprising also failed. The British soldier Rowland J. Mulkern participated in the uprising.

Great Ming uprising

A very short uprising occurred from 25 to 28 January 1903 in an attempt to establish a "Great Ming Heavenly Kingdom" (大明順天國). It involved Tse Tsan-tai, Li Jitang (李紀堂), Liang Muguang (梁慕光), and Hong Quanfu (洪全福), who had taken part in the Jintian uprising during the Taiping Heavenly Kingdom era.

Ping-Liu-Li uprising

Ma Fuyi (馬福益) and Huaxinghui was involved in an uprising in the areas of Pingxiang, Liuyang, and Liling (萍瀏醴起義) in 1905. The Ping-liu-li Uprising had recruited miners as early as 1903 to rise against the Qing ruling class. After the uprising failed, Ma Fuyi was executed.

Beijing assassination attempt

Wu Yue (吳樾) of the Guangfuhui carried out an assassination attempt at the Beijing Zhengyangmen East Railway station (正陽門車站) in an attack on five Qing officials on 24 September 1905.

=== 1907–1910 ===
Huanggang uprising

The Huanggang uprising (黃岡起義) was launched on 22 May 1907, in Chaozhou. The revolutionary party, along with Xu Xueqiu (許雪秋), Chen Yongpo (陳湧波), and Yu Tongshi (余通實), launched the uprising and captured the city of Huanggang. After the uprising began, the Qing government quickly and forcefully suppressed it. Around 200 revolutionaries were killed.

Qinühu uprising, Huizhou

In the same year, Sun sent more revolutionaries to Huizhou to launch the "Huizhou Qinühu uprising" (惠州七女湖起義). On 2 June, Deng Zhiyu (鄧子瑜) and Chen Chuan (陳純) gathered some followers, and together they seized Qing arms in the lake, 20 km (12 mi) from Huizhou. They killed several Qing soldiers and attacked Taiwei (泰尾) on 5 June. The Qing army fled in disorder, and the revolutionaries exploited the opportunity, captured several towns, and defeated the Qing army once again in Bazhiyie. Many organizations voiced their support after the uprising, and the revolutionary forces were 200 men at its height. The uprising, however, ultimately failed.

Anqing uprising

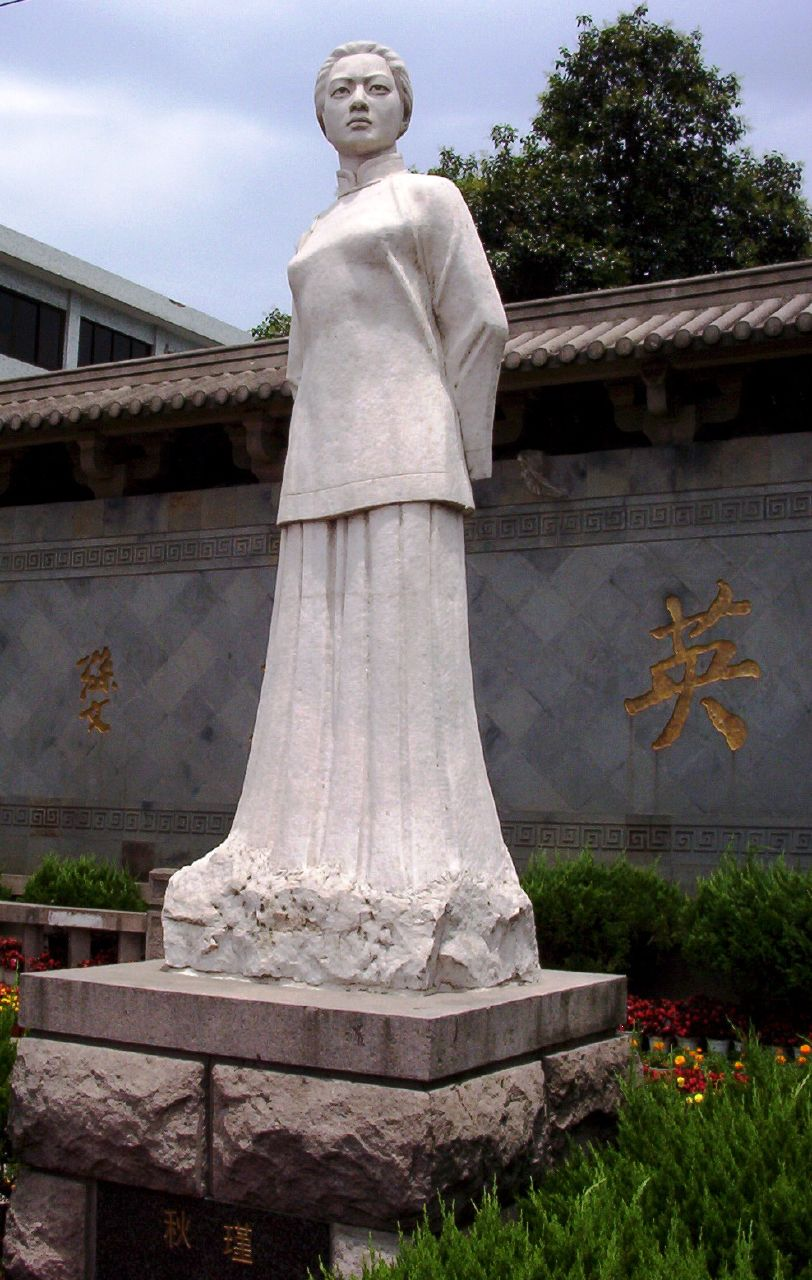
A statue to honor revolutionary Qiu Jin

On 6 July 1907, Xu Xilin of Guangfuhui led an uprising in Anqing, Anhui, which became known as the Anqing Uprising (安慶起義). Xu, the police commissioner and the supervisor of the police academy, led an uprising that aimed to assassinate the provincial governor of Anhui, En Ming (恩銘). They were defeated after four hours of fighting. Xu was captured, and En Ming's bodyguards cut out his heart and liver and ate them. His cousin Qiu Jin was executed a few days later.

Qinzhou uprising

From August to September 1907, the Qinzhou uprising occurred (欽州防城起義) against heavy taxation by the government. Sun sent Wang Heshun (王和順) there to assist the revolutionary army and captured the county in September. They attempted to besiege and capture Qinzhou but eventually had retreat to the area of Shiwandashan. Wang Heshun returned to Vietnam.

Zhennanguan uprising

On 1 December 1907, the Zhennanguan uprising (鎮南關起事) took place at Zhennanguan along the Chinese-Vietnamese border. Sun Yat-sen sent Huang Mintang (黃明堂) to monitor the pass, which was guarded by a fort. With the assistance of supporters among the fort's defenders, the revolutionaries captured the cannon tower in Zhennanguan. Sun, Huang Xing. and Hu Hanmin personally went to the tower to command the battle. The Qing government sent troops led by Long Jiguang and Lu Rongting to counterattack, and the revolutionaries were forced to retreat into the mountainous areas. After the uprising's failure, Sun was forced to move to Singapore due to anti-Sun sentiments within the revolutionary groups. He returned to the mainland only after the Wuchang Uprising.

Qin-Lian uprising

On 27 March 1908, Huang Xing launched a raid, later known as the Qin-Lian-Shangsi uprising (欽廉上思起義), from a base in Vietnam and attacked the cities of Qinzhou and Lianzhou, in Guangdong. The rebels continued for fourteen days but were forced to end after the revolutionaries ran out of supplies.

Hekou uprising

In April 1908, another uprising was launched in Hekou, Yunnan, called the Hekou uprising (雲南河口起義). Huang Mingtang (黃明堂) led two hundred men from Vietnam and attacked Hekou on 30 April. Other participating revolutionaries included Wang Heshun (王和順) and Guan Renfu (關仁甫). They were outnumbered and defeated by government troops, however, and the uprising failed.

Mapaoying Uprising

On 19 November 1908, the Mapaoying Uprising (馬炮營起義) was launched by the revolutionary group Yuewanghui (岳王會), led by Xiong Chenggei (熊成基) in Anhui. The Yuewanghui joined Tongmenghui. The uprising also failed.

=== 1910–1911 ===
Guangzhou

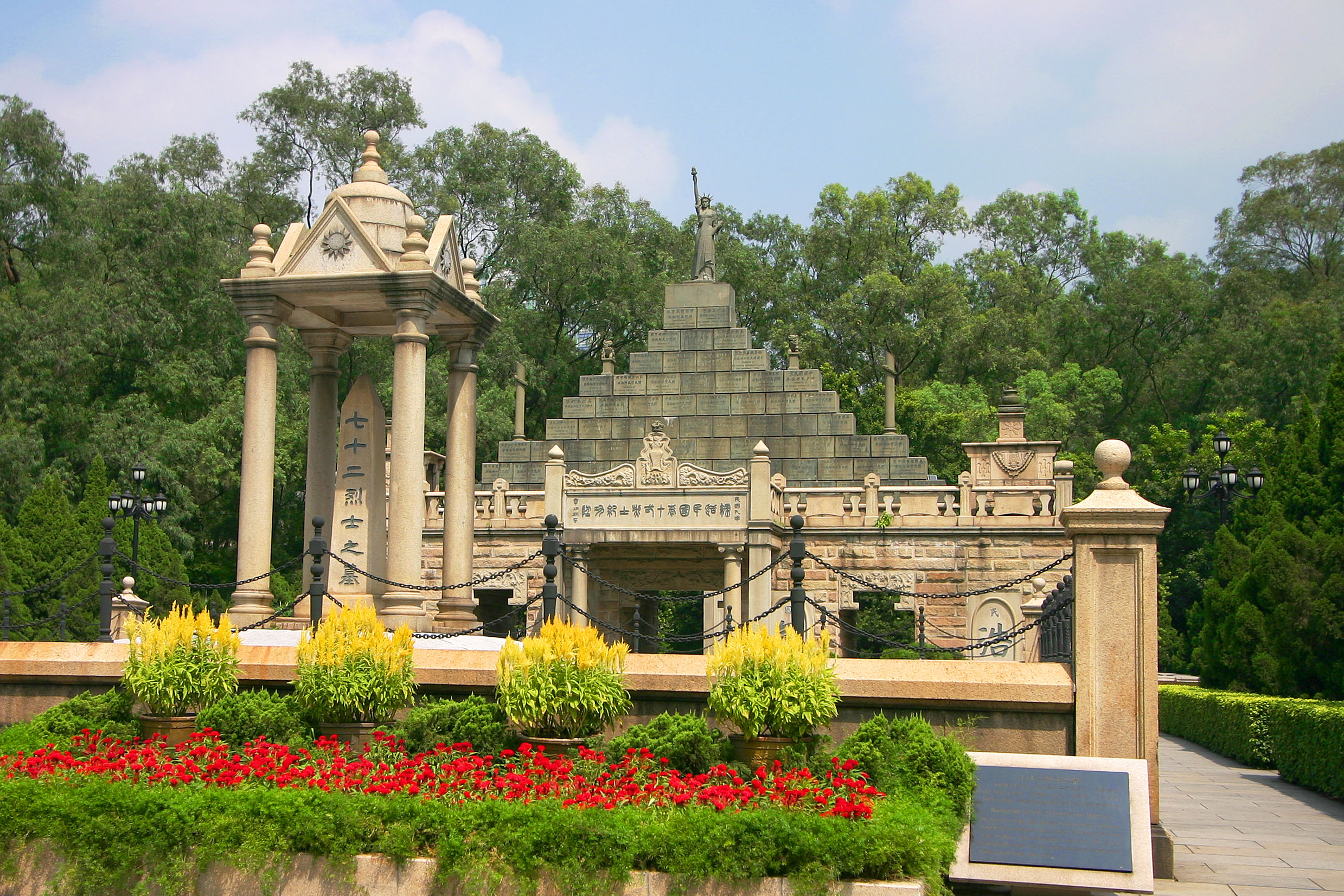
The memorial for the 72 martyrs

In February 1910, the Gengxu New Army Uprising (庚戌新軍起義), also known as the Guangzhou New Army Uprising (廣州新軍起義), took place. That involved a conflict between the citizens and local police against the New Army. After the revolutionary leader Ni Yingdian was killed by Qing forces, the remaining revolutionaries were quickly defeated, and the uprising failed.

On 27 April 1911, an uprising occurred in Guangzhou, known as the Second Guangzhou Uprising (辛亥廣州起義) or Yellow Flower Mound Revolt (黃花岡之役). It ended in disaster, as 86 bodies were found (only 72 could be identified). The 72 revolutionaries were remembered as martyrs. The revolutionary Lin Juemin was one of the 72. On the eve of battle, he wrote "A Letter to My Wife" (與妻訣別書), which later became considered a masterpiece in Chinese literature.

== Wuchang Uprising ==
The Iron Blood 18-star flag, used during the Wuchang Uprising

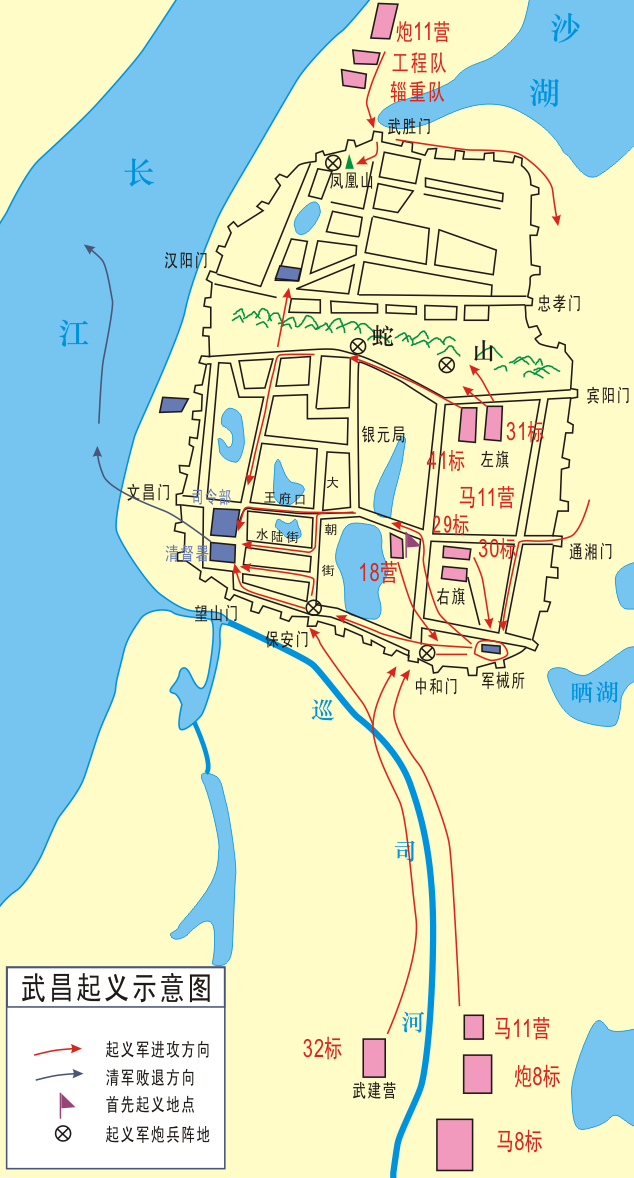
Paths of the uprising

The Literary Society (文學社) and the Progressive Association (共進會) were revolutionary organizations that involved in the uprising that began mainly by a Railway Protection Movement. In the late summer, some Hubei New Army units were ordered to neighboring Sichuan to quell the Railway Protection Movement, a mass protest against the Qing government's seizure and handover of local railway development ventures to foreign powers. Banner officers like Duanfang, the railway superintendent, and Zhao Erfeng led the New Army against the Railway Protection Movement.

The New Army units of Hubei had originally been the Hubei Army, which had been trained by Qing official Zhang Zhidong. On 24 September, the Literary Society and Progressive Association convened a conference in Wuchang, along with sixty representatives from local New Army units. During the conference, they established a headquarters for the uprising. The leaders of the two organizations, Jiang Yiwu (蔣翊武) and Sun Wu (孫武), were elected as commander and chief of staff. Initially, the date of the uprising was to be 6 October 1911. It was postponed because of insufficient preparations.

Revolutionaries intent on overthrowing the Qing dynasty had built bombs, and on 9 October, one of them accidentally exploded. Sun had no direct part in the uprising and was traveling in the United States to recruit more support from overseas Chinese. The Qing Viceroy of Huguang, Rui Cheng (瑞澂), tried to track down and arrest the revolutionaries. The squad leader Xiong Bingkun (熊秉坤) and others decided not to delay the uprising any longer and launched the revolt on 10 October 1911, at 7:00 p.m. The revolt was a success; the entire city of Wuchang had been captured by the revolutionaries on the morning of 11 October. That evening, they established a tactical headquarters and announced the establishment of the "Military Government of Hubei of Republic of China". The conference chose Li Yuanhong as the governor of the temporary government. Qing officers like the bannermen Duanfang and Zhao Erfeng were killed by the revolutionary forces.

Revolutionaries killed a German arms dealer in Hankou as he was delivering arms to the Qing. Revolutionaries killed 2 Germans and wounded 2 other Germans at the battle of Hanyang, including a former colonel.

== Nationwide uprisings after Wuchang ==
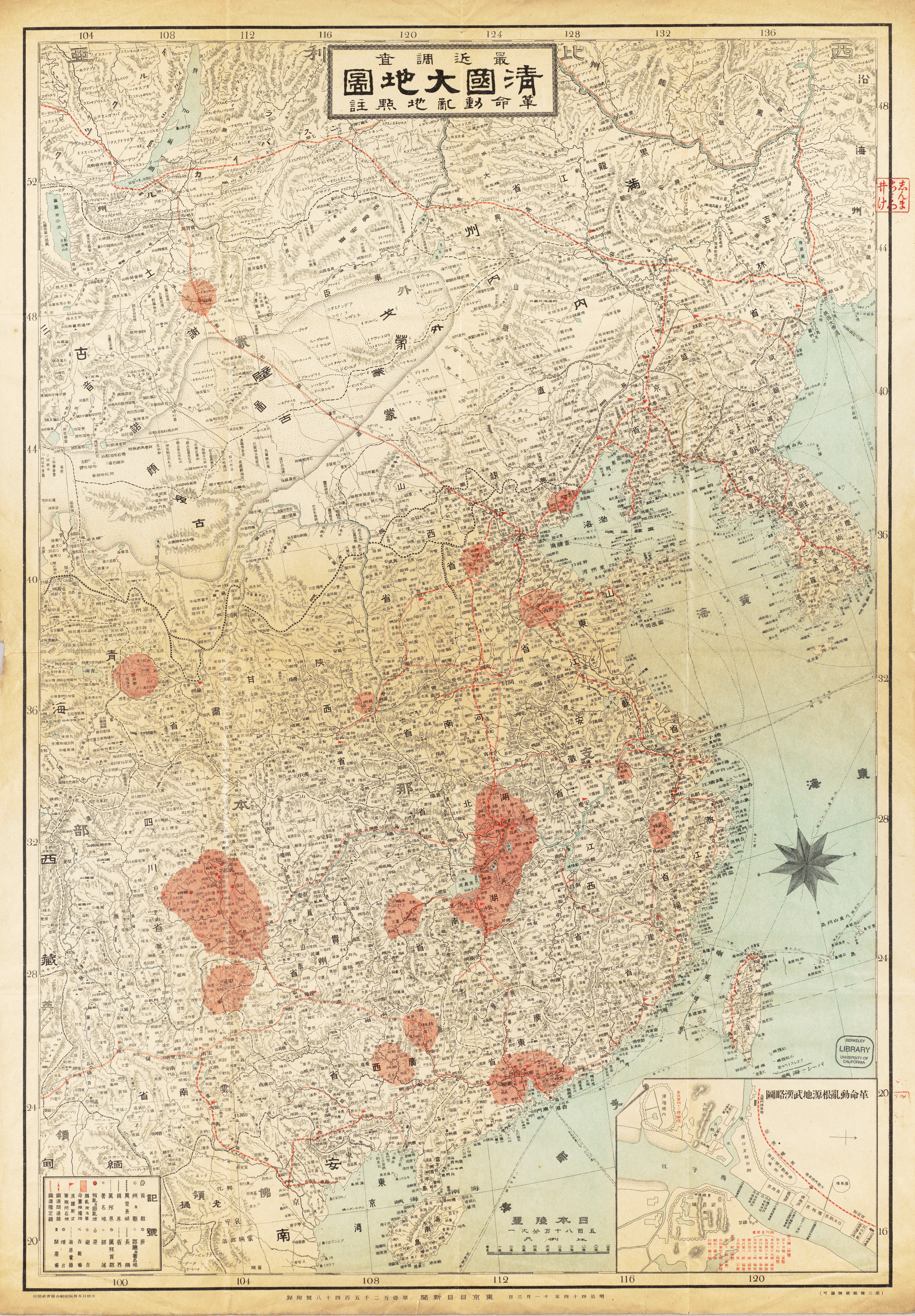
Map of uprisings during the 1911 Revolution

After the success of the Wuchang Uprising, many other protests occurred throughout the country for various reasons. Some uprisings declared restoration (光復) of Han Chinese rule. Other uprisings were a step toward independence, and some were protests or rebellions against the local authorities. Regardless of the reason for the uprising, the outcome was that all of the provinces renounced the Qing dynasty and joined the republicans.

=== Hunan ===
On 22 October 1911, the Hunan Tongmenghui were led by Jiao Dafeng (焦達嶧) and Chen Zuoxin (陳作新). They headed an armed group, consisting partly of revolutionaries from Hongjiang and defecting New Army units, in a campaign to extend the uprising into Changsha. They captured the city and killed the local Imperial general. They announced the establishment of the Hunan Military Government of the Republic of China and announced their opposition to the Qing Empire.

=== Shaanxi ===
On the same day, the Shaanxi Tongmenghui, led by Jing Dingcheng (景定成), Qian Ding (錢鼎), and Jing Wumu (井勿幕), and others including the Gelaohui, launched an uprising and captured Xi'an after two days of fighting. The Hui Muslim community was divided in its support for the revolution. The Hui Muslims of Shaanxi supported the revolutionaries, and the Hui Muslims of Gansu supported the Qing. The native Hui of Xi'an joined the Han Chinese revolutionaries in slaughtering the Manchus. The native Hui Muslims of Gansu province led by general Ma Anliang led more than twenty battalions of Hui troops to defend the Qing imperials and attacked Shaanxi, held by revolutionary Zhang Fenghui (張鳳翽). The attack was successful, and after news arrived that Puyi was about to abdicate, Ma agreed to join the new Republic. The revolutionaries established the "Qinlong Fuhan Military Government" and elected Zhang Fenghui, a member of the Yuanrizhi Society (原日知會), as new governor. After the Xi'an Manchu quarter fell on 24 October, Xinhai forces killed all the Manchus in the city, about 20,000. Many of its Manchu defenders committed suicide, including Qing General Wenrui (文瑞), who threw himself down a well. Only some wealthy Manchus who were ransomed and Manchu females survived. Wealthy Han Chinese seized Manchu girls to become their slaves, and poor Han Chinese troops seized young Manchu women to be their wives. Young Manchu girls were also seized by Hui Muslims of Xi'an during the massacre and brought up as Muslims.

The Hui General Ma Anliang abandoned the Qing cause upon the Qing abdication in the Xinhai Revolution, and the Manchu governor general Shengyun was enraged at the revolution.

Pro-revolution Hui Muslims like Shaanxi Governor Ma Yugui and Beijing Imam Wang Kuan persuaded Qing Hui General Ma Anliang to stop fighting by telling him that Muslims should not kill one another for the sake of the Qing monarchists but side with the republican revolutionaries. Ma Anliang then agreed to abandon the Qing under the combination of Yuan Shikai's actions and those messages from other Hui.

A year before the massacre of Manchus in October 1911, an oath against them had been sworn at the Great Goose Pagoda in Xi'an by the Gelaohui in 1911. Manchu banner garrisons were slaughtered in Nanjing, Zhenjiang, Taiyuan, Xi'an, Fuzhou and Wuchang The Manchu quarter was located in the northeastern part of Xi'an and walled off, and the Hui Muslim quarter was located in the northwestern part of Xi'an but did not have walls separating it from the Han parts. The southern part of Xi'an was entirely Han. Xi'an had the biggest Manchu banner garrison quarter by area before its destruction.

On 22 October 1911, the revolutionaries were led by students of the military academy who overcame the guards at the gates of Xi'an and shut them. They secured the arsenal, slaughtered all Manchus at their temple, and then stormed and slaughtered the Manchus in the Manchu banner quarter of the city. The Manchu quarter was set on fire, burning many Manchus alive. Many Manchus had stored gunpowder in their houses, which exploded from the fire and caused even more deaths. For three days, Manchu men, women and children alike were slaughtered. Only after that were Manchu women and girls spared, while Manchu men and boys continued to be slaughtered. Many Manchus committed suicide by overdosing on opium and throwing themselves into wells. It was estimated that between 10,000 and 20,000 Manchus were slaughtered.

Ma Anliang was ordered to attack the revolutionaries in Shaanxi by the baoyi bondservant Chang Geng and Manchu Shengyun.

Eastern soldiers of the new republic were mobilized by Yuan Shikai when the attack against Shaanxi began by Ma Anliang, but news of the abdication of the Qing Emperor reached Ma Anliang before he attacked Xi'an. That made Ma end all military operations and change his allegiance to the Republic of China. All pro-Qing military activity in the northwest was then put to an end.

Yuan Shikai managed to induce Ma not to attack Shaanxi after the Gelaohui took over the province and to accept the Republic of China under his presidency in 1912. During the National Protection War in 1916 between republicans and Yuan's monarchy, Ma readied his soldiers and informed the republicans that he and the Muslims would stick to Yuan until the end. Yuan Shikai ordered Ma Anliang to block Bai Lang (White Wolf) from going into Sichuan and Gansu by blocking Hanzhong and Fengxiangfu.

The Protestant Shensi mission operated a hospital in Xian. Some American missionaries were reported killed in Xi'an. A report claimed Manchus massacred missionaries in the suburbs of Xi'an. Missionaries were reported killed in Xi'an and Taiyuan. Shaanxi joined the revolution on October 24. Sheng Yun was governor of Shaanxi in 1905.

Some Gansu Hui, led by Ma Fuxiang, joined the republicans. General Ma Fuxiang did not participate with Ma Anliang in the battles with Shaanxi revolutionaries and refused to join the Qing Manchu Shengyun and Changgeng in their attempts to defend the Qing before their abdication, but the independence of Gansu from Qing control was jointly declared by non-Muslim gentry with Hui Muslim Ma Fuxiang.

=== Jiangxi ===
Flag used by naval fleet during the Jiujiang Uprising

On 23 October, Lin Sen, Jiang Qun (蔣群), Cai Hui (蔡蕙), and other members of the Tongmenghui in the province of Jiangxi plotted a revolt of New Army units. A Qing naval fleet also revolted against the state, which solidified victory in the Wuchang Uprising. After they achieved victory, they announced their independence. The Jiujiang Military Government was then established.

Late at night on October 30, the 54th Regiment of the New Army stationed in Nanchang rose in revolt. Students of the city's Army Primary School and Surveying School coordinated with them, opening the city gates to let the New Army in. The garrison troops, patrol forces, and naval units within Nanchang all raised white flags in response, and the revolutionaries thereupon took control of the city. On November 1, the Tongmenghui convened a meeting of representatives from all sectors at the provincial chamber of commerce in the Wanshou Palace on Hetong Lane, issued a telegraphic declaration of Jiangxi's independence, and elected Wu Jiezhang, commander of the New Army's 27th Mixed Brigade, as military governor (dudu). On the 2nd, Wu took office as military governor, establishing the military government at the Higher School. Beyond the provincial capital, Yuanzhou, Ruizhou, Linjiang, Poyang, and other localities went over to the revolution one after another, each installing its own military governor. Subsequently, the seal of the Jiangxi military governor changed hands three times (Wu Jiezhang, Peng Chengwan, Ma Yubao); order was only restored later when the Nanjing Provisional Government dispatched Tongmenghui member Li Liejun to take over the post.

To address the panic among the local Banner population, the Jiangxi military government, in answering a Banner resident named Zhang who had inquired about the aims of the revolution, had Zhang Zongjie, the head of its law-enforcement section, explain that this was a political revolution, not a racial one; that if the Banner people submitted in good faith they could still reside where they were, and that Han Bannermen could each return to their native places, all to be treated equally and afforded protection. He also issued Zhang a permit, instructing him to survey the Banner population's households so that a new register could be compiled.

=== Shanxi ===
On 29 October, Yan Xishan of the New Army led an uprising in Taiyuan, the capital city of the province of Shanxi. The rebels in Taiyuan bombarded the streets where Banner people resided and killed all the Manchu. They managed to kill the Qing Governor of Shanxi, Lu Zhongqi (陸鍾琦). They then announced the establishment of Shanxi Military Government with Yan Xishan as the military governor.

=== Yunnan ===
On 30 October, Li Genyuan (李根源) of the Tongmenghui in Yunnan joined with Cai E, Luo Peijin (羅佩金), Tang Jiyao, and other officers of the New Army to launch the Double Ninth Uprising (重九起義). They captured Kunming the next day, established the Yunnan Military Government, and chose Cai E as the military governor.

=== Shanghai ===
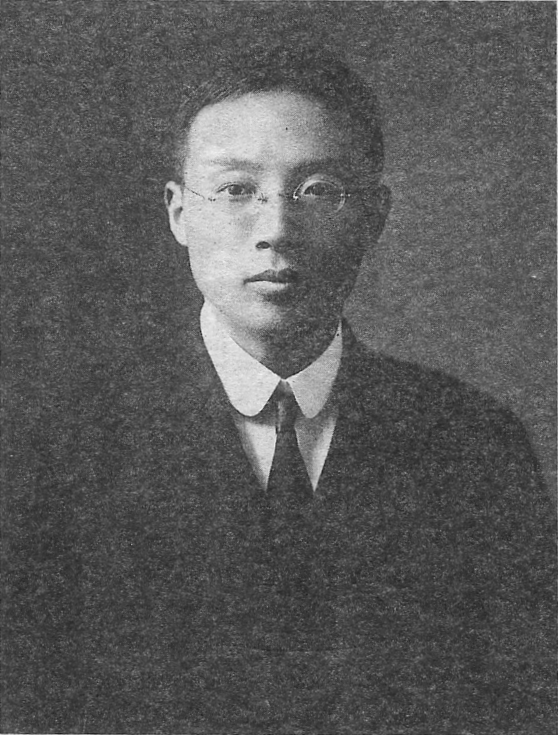
Chen Qimei, military governor of Shanghai

On 3 November, the Shanghai Tongmenghui and Guangfuhui and merchants led by Chen Qimei, Li Pingsu (李平書), Zhang Chengyou (張承槱), Li Yingshi (李英石), Li Xiehe (李燮和), and Song Jiaoren organized an armed rebellion in Shanghai. They received support from local police officers. The rebels captured the Jiangnan Workshop on the 4th and captured Shanghai soon afterward. On 8 November, they established the Shanghai Military Government and elected Chen Qimei as the military governor. He would eventually become one of the founders of the four big families of the Republic of China, along with some of the most well-known families of the era.

=== Guizhou ===
On 4 November, Zhang Bailin (張百麟) of the revolutionary party in Guizhou led an uprising, along with New Army units and students from the military academy. They immediately captured Guiyang, established the Great Han Guizhou Military Government, and chose Yang Jincheng (楊藎誠) and Zhao Dequan (趙德全) as respectively the chief and vice governor.

=== Zhejiang ===
Also on 4 November, revolutionaries in Zhejiang urged the New Army units in Hangzhou to launch an uprising. Zhu Rui (朱瑞), Wu Siyu (吳思豫), Lu Gongwang (吕公望) and others of the New Army captured the military supplies workshop. Other units, led by Chiang Kai-shek and Yin Zhirei (尹銳志), captured most of the government offices. Eventually, Hangzhou was under the control of the revolutionaries, and the constitutionalist Tang Shouqian (湯壽潛) was chosen as the military governor.

=== Jiangsu ===
On 5 November, the Jiangsu constitutionalists and gentry urged Qing Governor Cheng Dequan (程德全) to declare independence and established the Jiangsu Revolutionary Military Government with Cheng himself as the governor. Unlike some other cities, anti-Manchu violence began after the restoration on 7 November in Zhenjiang. Qing General Zaimu (載穆) agreed to surrender, but because of a misunderstanding, the revolutionaries were unaware that their safety was guaranteed. The Manchu quarters were ransacked, and an unknown number of Manchus were killed. Zaimu, feeling betrayed, committed suicide. This is regarded as the Zhenjiang Uprising (鎮江起義).

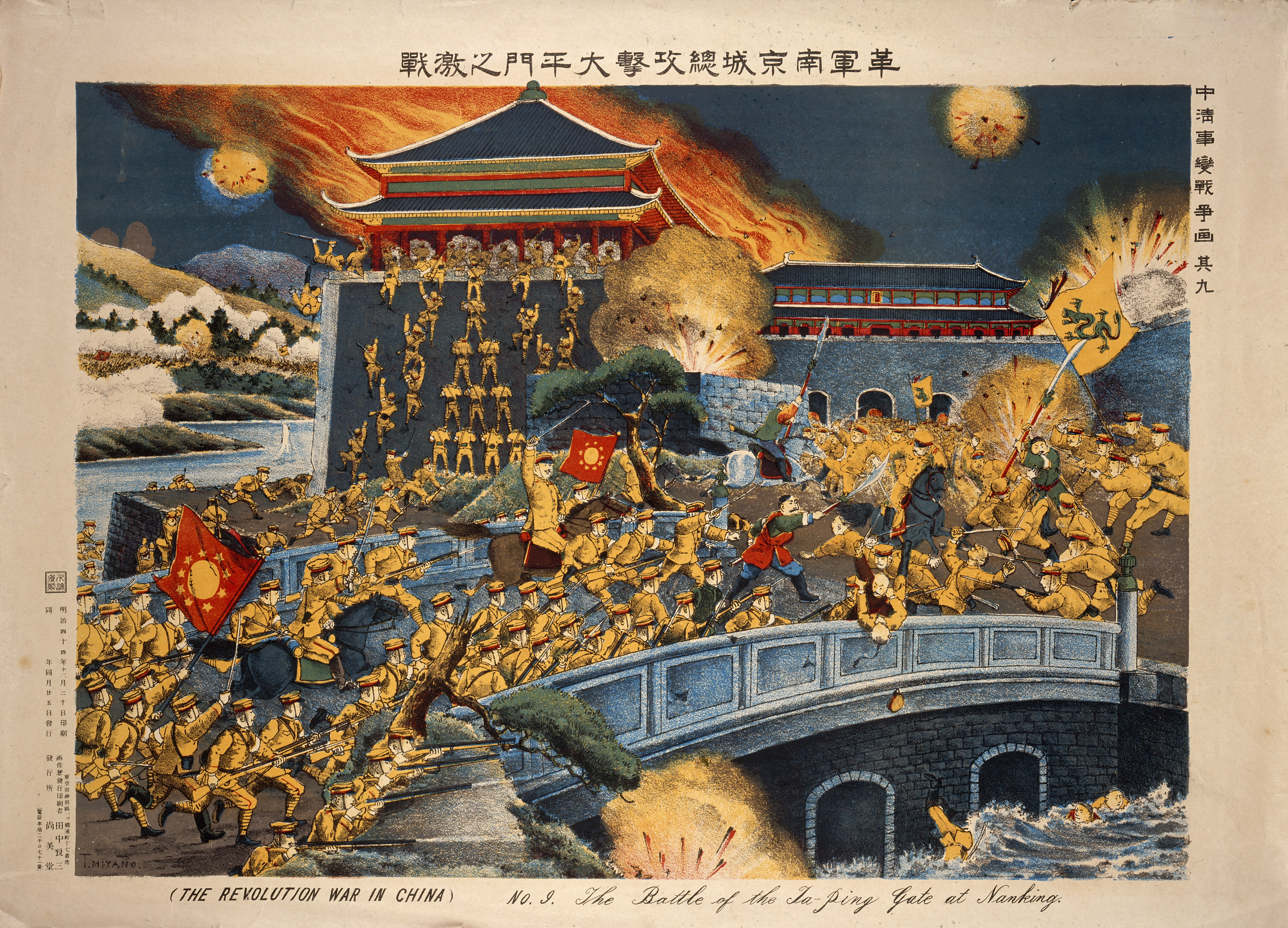
1911 battle at Ta-ping gate, Nanjing. Painting by Tanaka Ryōzō (田中良三)

On 8 November, supported by the Tongmenghui, Xu Shaozhen (徐紹楨) of the New Army announced an uprising in Molin Pass (秣陵關), 30 km (19 mi) away from Nanjing. Xu Shaozhen, Chen Qimei and other generals decided to form a united army under Xu to strike Nanjing together. On 11 November, the united army headquarters was established in Zhenjiang.

Between 24 November and 1 December, under the command of Xu Shaozhen, the united army captured Wulongshan (烏龍山), Mufushan (幕府山)), Yuhuatai (雨花臺)), Tianbao (天保城)) among other Qing army strongholds. On 2 December, Nanjing was captured by the revolutionaries after the Battle of Nanjing. On 3 December, revolutionary Su Liangbi led troops in a massacre of a large number of Manchus. Shortly afterward, he was arrested, and his troops were disbanded.

=== Anhui ===
Members of the Anhui Tongmenghui also launched an uprising on that day and laid siege to the provincial capital. The constitutionalists persuaded Zhu Jiabao, the Qing governor of Anhui, to declare independence.

=== Guangxi ===
On 7 November, the Guangxi political department decided to secede from the Qing government and declared Guangxi's independence. Qing Governor Shen Bingkun (沈秉堃) was allowed to remain, but Lu Rongting soon became the new governor. Lu Rongting would later rise to prominence during the Warlord Era, and his bandits controlled Guangxi for more than a decade. Under leadership of Huang Shaohong, the Muslim law student Bai Chongxi was enlisted into a Dare to Die unit to fight as a revolutionary.

=== Fujian ===
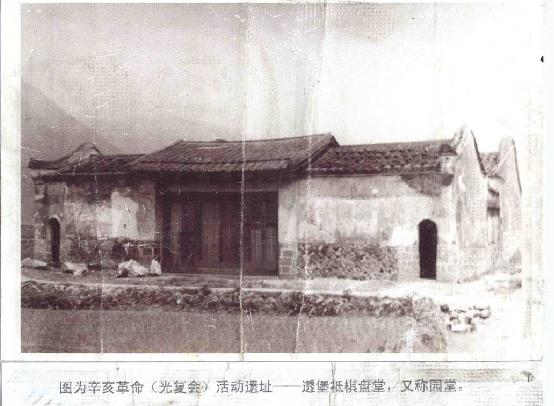
One of the old buildings occupied by the Guangfuhui in Lianjiang County, Fujian

In November, members of Fujian's branch of the Tongmenghui, along with Sun Daoren (孫道仁) of the New Army, launched an uprising against the Qing army. The Qing viceroy, Song Shou (松壽), committed suicide. On 11 November, the entire Fujian province declared independence. The Fujian Military Government was established, and Sun Daoren was chosen as the military governor.

=== Guangdong ===
Near the end of October, Chen Jiongming, Deng Keng (鄧鏗), Peng Reihai (彭瑞海), and other members of Guangdong's Tongmenghui organized local militias to launch the uprising in Huazhou, Nanhai, Sunde and Sanshui in Guangdong Province. On 8 November, after being persuaded by Hu Hanmin, General Li Zhun (李準) and Long Jiguang (龍濟光) of the Guangdong Navy agreed to support the revolution. The Qing viceroy of Liangguang, Zhang Mingqi (張鳴岐), was forced to discuss with local representatives a proposal for Guangdong's independence. They decided to declare it the next day. Chen Jiongming then captured Huizhou. On 9 November, Guangdong declared its independence and established a military government. They elected Hu Hanmin and Chen Jiongming as Chief and Vice-Governor. Qiu Fengjia is known to have helped make the declaration of independence more peaceful. It was unknown at the time if representatives from the European colonies of Hong Kong and Macau would be ceded to the new government.

=== Shandong ===
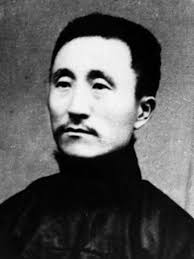
Xu Jingxin (1874–1914), a native from Huang County and the provincial head of Tongmenghui, played a vital role in the revolution in Shandong. After Yuan Shikai seized power, Xu was captured and murdered in Beijing

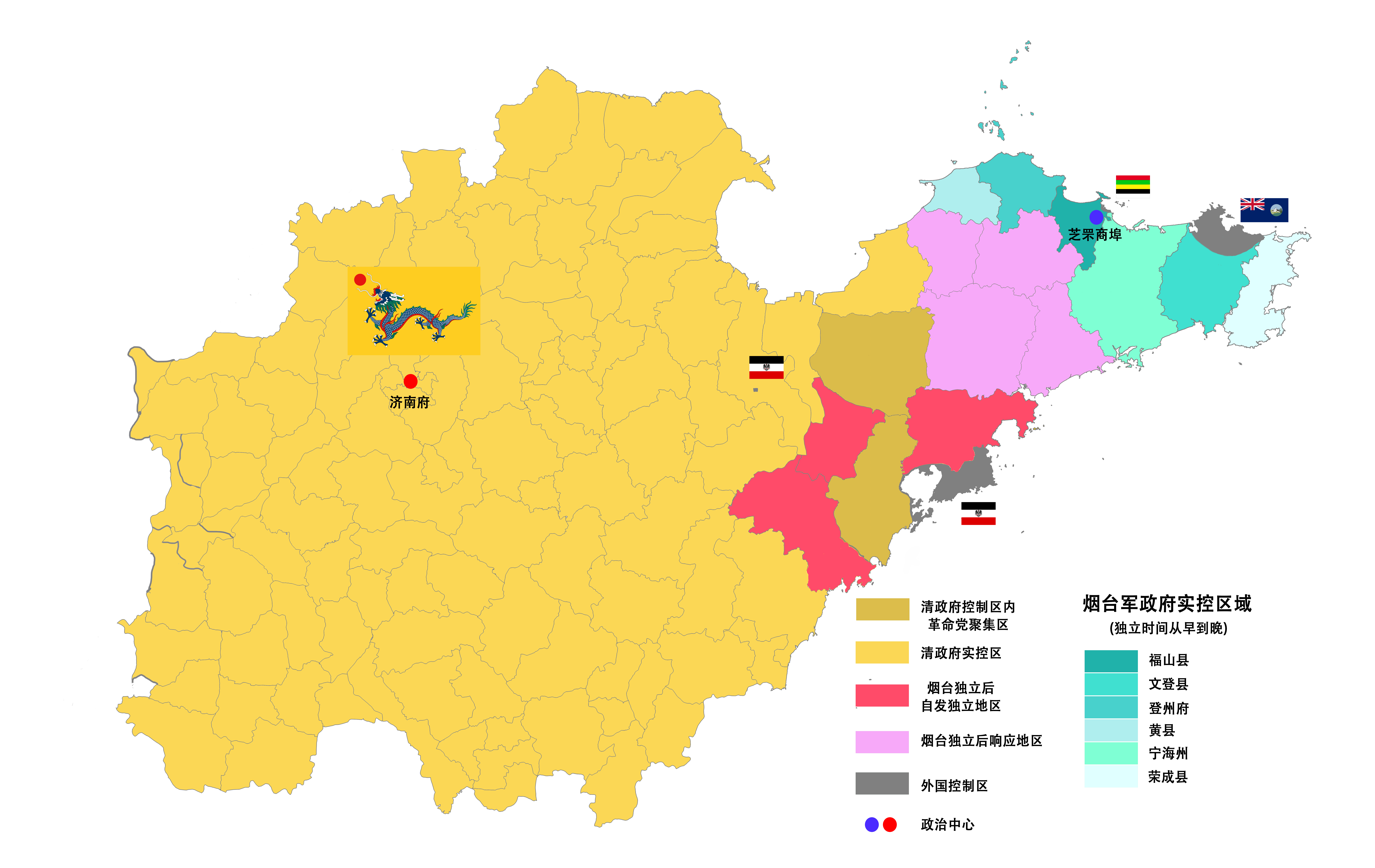
Situation in Shandong in the late 1911: Qing government–controlled areas Revolutionary party concentration areas within Qing government–control Self-declared independent areas after Yantai's independence Areas responding to Yantai's declaration of independence Foreign colonies (Weihaiwei and Kiautschou) Fushan County Wendeng County Dengzhou Prefecture Huang County Ninghai Subprefecture Rongcheng County

On November 12, 1911, members of the Tongmenghui in Yantai, Shandong, including Luan Zhongyao (欒鍾堯) and Gong Xide (宮錫德)—collectively known as the "Eighteen Heroes"—launched an uprising and seized the Yantai Coastal Defense Battalion. Upon learning of the revolt, the Yantai Circuit Intendant Xu Shiguang fled with his family to seek protection at the residence of the British official, head of the Donghai Customs (東海關稅務司). On November 13, the "Eighteen Heroes" sent a telegram to the Shanghai Military Governor Chen Qimei, declaring Yantai's independence and announcing the establishment of the Shandong Military Government. The following day, it was renamed the Shandong–Yantai Military and Political Sub-Administration, and Wang Chuanjiong, captain of the Qing Navy warship Wufeng, was elected commander-in-chief of the Yantai Military and Political Sub-Administration.

On November 13, under the persuasion of the Shandong revolutionary Ding Weifen (丁惟汾) and coercion from some officers, including acting commander Jia Binqing of the Fifth New Army Division, the Governor of Shandong Sun Baoqi agreed to declare Shandong's independence and was elected military governor. On November 24, however, Sun Baoqi again rescinded the declaration of independence under pressure from the Fifth New Army Division. Yuan Shikai ordered Zhang Guangjian to be promoted from sub-prefectural magistrate to provincial administration commissioner, and Wu Bingxiang to be promoted from reserve assistant magistrate to commissioner of police affairs. They launched a crackdown on revolutionaries, ordering police to erase all street posters bearing the slogan "Over four thousand years since the Yellow Emperor" and replace them with notices bearing the reign year of Xuantong.

On the morning of December 10, Wu Bingxiang dispatched military police to conduct a sudden raid on the "Yichun Studio", a photography studio and clock-repair shop on the south side of the western end of Jing’er Road, in the Jinan commercial district, as well as the "Wanshunheng" foreign-goods shop on Wanzi Alley. Fourteen revolutionaries, including Liu Pulin and Du Jin, were arrested. Lan Shengjiu was beaten to death on the spot with rifle butts, and property from both shops was looted. This incident is historically known as the Yichun Studio Massacre.

=== Ningxia ===
On 17 November, the Ningxia Tongmenghui launched the Ningxia uprising (寧夏會黨起義). The revolutionaries sent Yu Youren to Zhangjiachuan to meet the Dungan Sufi master Ma Yuanzhang to persuade him not to support the Qing. However, Ma did not want to endanger his relationship with the Qings. He sent the eastern Gansu Muslim militia under the command of one of his sons to help Ma Qi fight the Ningxia Gelaohui.

Ma Anliang, Changgeng, and Shengyun failed to capture Shaanxi from the revolutionaries. In Ningxia, Qing forces were attacked by both Hui Muslim Gelaohui and Han Gelaohui members, and Hui General Ma Qi and Ma Yuanzhang were in the Qing forces fighting against them, Hoverver, Ma Yuanzhang defected to the republicans after Ma Anliang had given up on the Qing. However, the Ningxia Revolutionary Military Government was established on 23 November. Some revolutionaries involved included Huang Yue (黃鉞) and Xiang Shen (向燊), who gathered New Army forces at Qinzhou (秦州).

=== Liaoning ===
On November 6, 1911, revolutionaries including Lan Tianwei held a meeting at the North Barracks to work out how to expel Zhao Erxun, the Viceroy of the Three Northeastern Provinces. Owing to a lapse in vigilance, they were betrayed by Li Hexiang, a battalion commander under Lan Tianwei. Zhao Erxun, who was on an inspection tour in Heilongjiang, learned of this and immediately hurried back to Shenyang, ordering martial law throughout the city. On the afternoon of November 12, Zhao Erxun convened the inaugural meeting of the "Fengtian Citizens' Public Security Association" at the provincial advisory council. Zhang Zuolin took control of the venue by force, and Zhao Erxun was elected president, Wu Xiangzhen, commander of the Qing army's 39th Brigade, vice-president, and Zhang Zuolin deputy head of the military affairs department. Branch associations were set up in localities across the province as prescribed, in order to keep the situation under control. The 2,500 men of Zhang Zuolin's patrol battalions moved into the provincial capital in succession. To counter this, on November 17 Zhang Rong, Zhang Genren, and others made contact with various sectors of Liaoning society and founded the "Fengtian United Radical Advance Society".

On November 20, Gu Renyi led the people's army in an attack on the Qing patrol force stationed at Lijia Wolong, winning the first engagement. On November 27, the insurgent army proclaimed the establishment of the "Republic of China Military Government Sub-Bureau". On November 29, Gu Renyi's forces attacked the patrol force stationed at Shuimenzi, winning again. At this point, since the situation nationwide was still unclear, Zhao Erxun employed suppression and conciliation together: on the one hand he applied pressure with cavalry, infantry, and artillery units, and on the other he entered into negotiations with the insurgent army. Gu Renyi accepted ten thousand taels of silver in military funds and, on the condition that he not surrender military command, reorganized the people's army into a local patrol force. But after Feng Guozhang captured Hanyang on November 27, Zhao Erxun felt free to suppress the revolution in earnest, and on January 23, 1912, he sent Yuan Jinkai to assassinate Zhang Rong, leader of the Radical Advance Society; more than a hundred others were subsequently killed as well.

At the end of January 1912, Lan Tianwei, acting on orders from the Republican government, deployed three troop transport ships to set out for Huayuankou. From the night of February 1 into the morning of the 2nd, the main Northern Expedition force landed in the area of Pizihu, Huayuankou, and Dagushan, with Lan Tianwei going to Dalian to direct operations. On February 3, the Northern Expedition army fought a fierce battle against the Qing patrol force north of Huayuankou and won. On February 4, they fought the Qing army at Shuimenzi and captured Li Zirui, deputy commander of the patrol force, and battalion commander Chen Baoshan. On the 6th, the Northern Expedition army occupied Wafangdian. On February 10, they took Zhuanghe, and the Qing army fled in defeat. Just as the Northern Expedition army and the people's army were preparing to take Shenyang, the Qing emperor issued an edict of abdication on February 12.

=== Sichuan ===
On 21 November, Guang'an organized the Great Han Shu Northern Military Government.

On 22 November, Chengdu and Sichuan declared independence. By the 27th, the Great Han Sichuan Military Government had been established, headed by revolutionary Pu Dianzun (蒲殿俊). The Qing official Duanfang would also be killed.

=== Xinjiang ===
In Xinjiang on 28 December, Liu Xianzun (劉先俊) and revolutionaries started the Dihua Uprising (迪化起義). This was led by more than 100 members of Gelaohui. This uprising failed. On 7 January 1912, the Yili Uprising (伊犁起義) with Feng Temin began. Qing governor Yuan Dahua (袁大化) fled and submitted his resignation to Yang Zengxin because he could not handle fighting the revolutionaries.

On 8 January, a new Yili government was established for the revolutionaries. Some Chinese historians now believe that contributed to the Qing dynasty's fall because it prevented the Qing's plan to flee to the west. The revolutionaries would be defeated at Jinghe in January and February; Eventually, the abdication to come would make Yuan Shikai recognize Yang Zengxin's rule and appoint him Governor of Xinjiang, and the province join the republicans. Eleven more former Qing officials would be assassinated in Zhenxi, Karashahr, Aksu, Kucha, Luntai, and Kashgar in April and May 1912.

The revolutionaries printed new multilingual media.

== Reactions outside China proper ==
Map of Qing China in 1820, before the cession of Outer Manchuria and Taiwan. Traditional China proper (also known as the Eighteen Provinces) is labelled in a deeper tone, whereas the exterior territories administered through the Lifan Yuan lie outside it. Owing to the wave of immigration in the late 19th century, Northeastern China became overwhelmingly Han-populated and was incorporated into provinces, thereby following the same political current as China proper during the 1911 Revolution.

Under the Qing, the emperor's authority over Tibet and Mongolia rested on relationships distinct from his rule over China proper. The Manchu monarch ruled the Mongols as a successor to the Great Khans (Bogda Khan), and was tied to Tibet through the priest-patron (mchod-yon) relationship between the imperial house and the Dalai and Panchen Lamas, being regarded in Tibetan Buddhist tradition as an emanation of the bodhisattva Manjushri. Because these bonds were often understood as personal to the dynasty rather than to the Chinese state, the fall of the Qing in 1911–1912 was interpreted by leaders in Lhasa and Urga as dissolving their allegiance, and both Tibet and Outer Mongolia moved to assert independence from the new republic.

=== Tibet ===
The Qing sent Zhao Erfeng to Tibet to fight the 1905 Tibetan Rebellion. By 1908, Zhao was appointed imperial resident in Lhasa. Zhao was beheaded in December 1911 by pro-Republican forces. The bulk of the area historically known as Kham was now claimed to be the Xikang Administrative District, created by the republican revolutionaries.

By the end of 1912, the last Qing troops had been forced out of Tibet through India. Thubten Gyatso, the 13th Dalai Lama, returned to Tibet in January 1913 from Sikkim, where he had been residing. When the new Chinese government apologized for the actions of the Qing and offered to restore the Dalai Lama to his former position, he replied that he was not interested in Chinese ranks, Tibet had never been subordinated to China, Tibet was an independent country, and he was assuming the spiritual and political leadership of Tibet. That has many read the reply as a formal declaration of independence. The Chinese side ignored the response, and Tibet was free of interference from China until 1951. Tibet is still ruled by China.

=== Xinjiang ===
In Xinjiang on 28 December, Liu Xianzun (劉先俊) and revolutionaries started the Dihua Uprising (迪化起義). This was led by more than 100 members of Gelaohui. This uprising failed. On 7 January 1912, the Yili Uprising (伊犁起義) with Feng Temin began. Qing governor Yuan Dahua (袁大化) fled and submitted his resignation to Yang Zengxin because he could not handle fighting the revolutionaries.

On 8 January, a new Yili government was established for the revolutionaries. Some Chinese historians now believe that contributed to the Qing dynasty's fall because it prevented the Qing's plan to flee to the west. The revolutionaries would be defeated at Jinghe in January and February; Eventually, the abdication to come would make Yuan Shikai recognize Yang Zengxin's rule and appoint him Governor of Xinjiang, and the province join the republicans. Eleven more former Qing officials would be assassinated in Zhenxi, Karashahr, Aksu, Kucha, Luntai, and Kashgar in April and May 1912.

The revolutionaries printed new multilingual media.

=== Outer Mongolia ===
At the end of 1911, Outer Mongolia took action with an armed revolt against Qing authorities but was unsuccessful. The independence movement that took place was not limited to Outer Mongolia but was a pan-Mongolian phenomenon. On 29 December 1911, Bogd Khan became the ruler of the Bogd Khanate. Inner Mongolia became a contested terrain between the Bogd Khanate and China. In general, Russia supported the independence of Outer Mongolia (including Tannu Uriankhai) during the 1911 Revolution.

Tibet and Outer Mongolia then recognized each other in a treaty. In 1919, the Republic of China regained Outer Mongolia but lost it again in 1921. China, a member of the United Nations, has officially recognized the independence of Outer Mongolia since 1949. Taiwan opened a cultural representative office and economy as part of its recognition of Mongolia in 2002.

=== Tannu Uriankhai ===
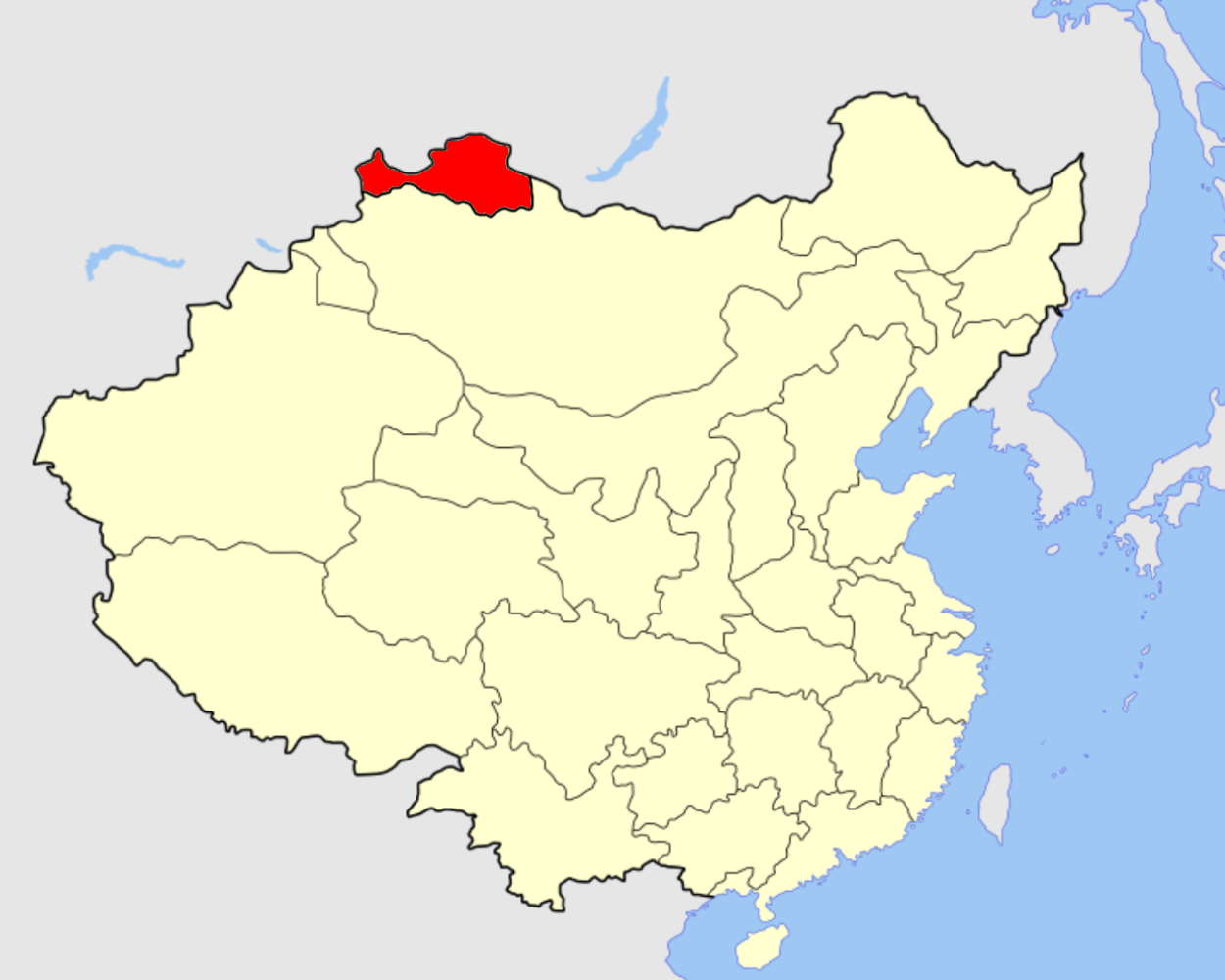
Map of Uryankhay Republic in 1911

In February 1912, Gombo-Dorzhu (Комбу-Доржу), the banner governor (總管) holding the rank of deputy lieutenant-general of Tannu Banner, declared the independence of the three banners under his authority and established the Uryankhay Republic. Claiming to have been chosen as the leader of an independent Uriankhai, he—together with Buyan-Badyrgy (Буян-Бадыргы), the governor of Khemchik Banner (Хемчик кожууну)-submitted a petition to Russia, requesting that Russia send troops to protect the region and prevent it from once again falling under Chinese control. The noyans of the other two banners, however, preferred to join the Mongolian Bogd Khanate. The policy of the Russian cabinet was to expand its influence and gradually absorb the region, and—fearing that hasty action would provoke China—it did not respond to Gombo-Dorzhu's request. In 1912, Nicholas II, Emperor of Russia, used attacks on Russian settlers as a pretext to send troops into Tannu Uriankhai, and the twenty-seven sumu of the central region were all occupied by Russian forces. In the Uriankhai territory belonging to the Erut Beise Banner of the Sain Noyon Khan Aimag, "after the Xinhai Revolution the Russians expelled the beise and arbitrarily appointed a lama named Chymba (Чымба) as governor, placing seventeen sumu under his administration", which was also known as the "Beise Banner" (Бээзи кожууну). In the autumn of 1913, the noyans of the other two banners changed their stance and likewise submitted a petition to Russia, seeking incorporation into Russia. In April 1914, the Uryankhay Republic formally accepted the protection of the Russian Empire, becoming the Uriankhai Krai. The government of the Russian Empire appointed a commissioner of affairs to administer the region; in 1915, it further declared that Russia's civil code, criminal code, and various other legal codes would all apply to Uriankhai Krai.

== Change of government ==
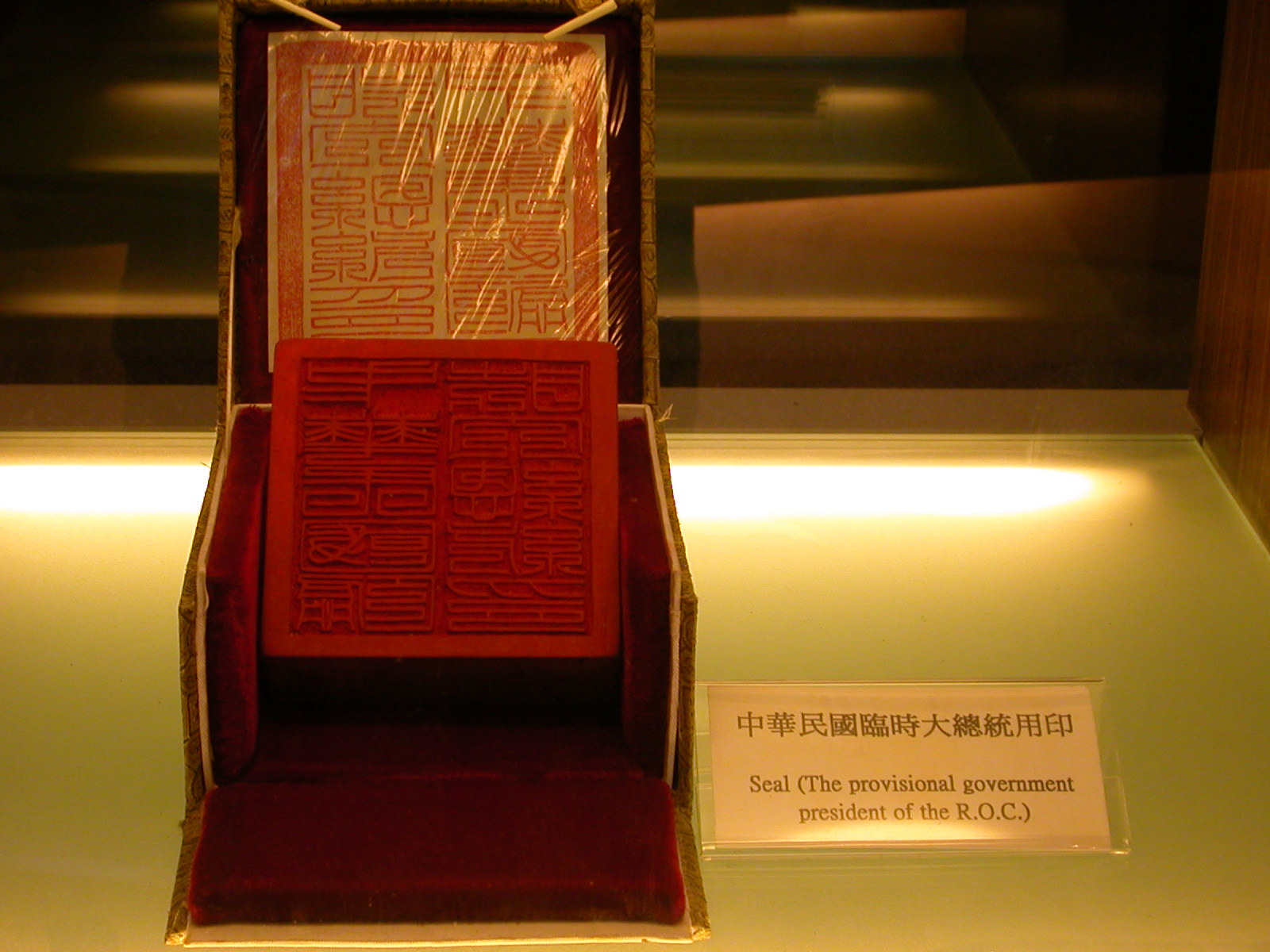
Presidential seal of the provisional government of the Republic of China

=== North: Qing Court final reform attempt ===
On 1 November 1911, the Qing government appointed Yuan Shikai as Prime Minister of the imperial cabinet, replacing Prince Qing. On 3 November, after a proposition by Cen Chunxuan from the Constitutional Monarchy Movement, the Qing court passed the Nineteen Articles, which turned the Qing from an absolute monarchy to a constitutional monarchy. On 9 November, Huang Xing even cabled Yuan Shikai and invited him to join the Republic. The changes were too late, and the Emperor was about to be forced to abdicate.

=== South: Provisional Government in Nanking ===
On 28 November 1911, Wuchang and Hanyang had fallen back to the Qing army. For their safety, the revolutionaries convened their first conference at the British Concession in Hankou on 30 November. By 2 December, the revolutionary forces were able to capture Nanking in the uprising; and the revolutionaries decided to make it the site of the new provisional government. At the time, Beijing was still the Qing capital.

=== North–South Conference ===
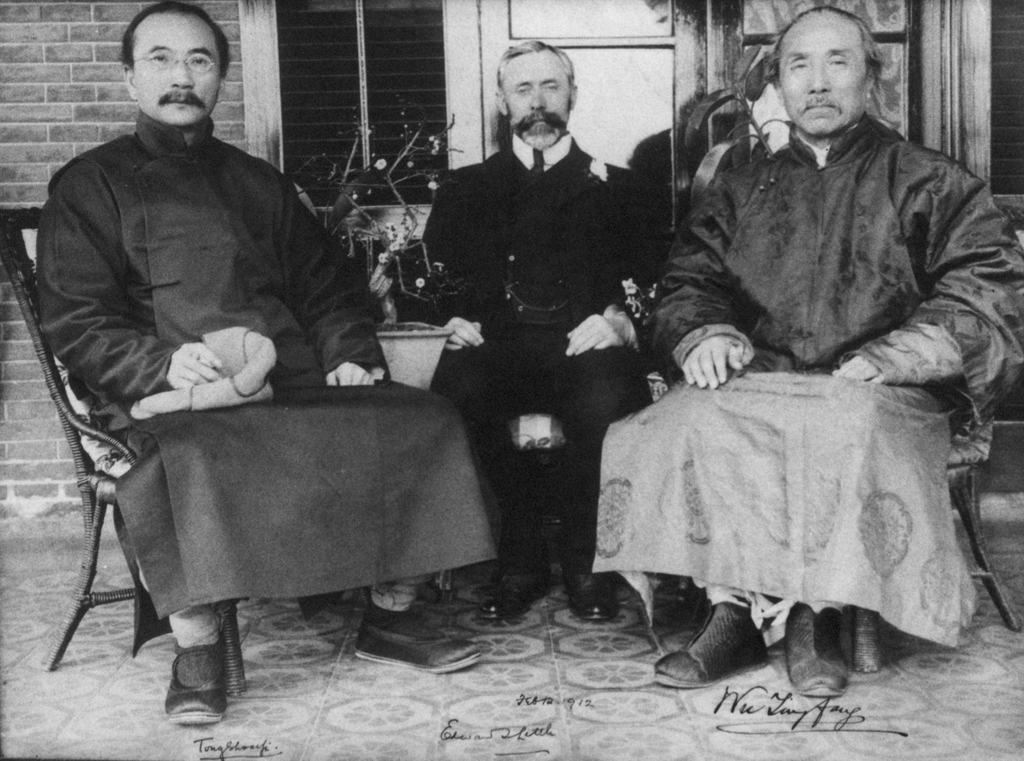
Tang Shaoyi (left), Edward Selby Little (middle), and Wu Tingfang (right)

On 18 December, the North–South Conference was held in Shanghai to discuss issues in the north and the south. The reluctance of foreign financiers to give financial support to the Qing government or the revolutionaries contributed to both sides agreeing to start negotiations. Yuan Shikai selected Tang Shaoyi as his representative. Tang left Beijing for Wuhan to negotiate with the revolutionaries. The revolutionaries chose Wu Tingfang. With the intervention of six foreign powers (the United Kingdom, the United States, Germany, Russia, Japan, and France), Tang Shaoyi and Wu Tingfang began to negotiate a settlement at the British concession.

The foreign businessman Edward Selby Little (李德立) acted as the negotiator and facilitated the peace agreement. They agreed that Yuan Shikai would force the Qing emperor to abdicate in exchange for the southern provinces' support of him as President of the Republic. After considering the possibility that the new republic might be defeated in a civil war or by foreign invasion, Sun agreed to Yuan's proposal to unify China under Yuan Shikai's Beijing government. Further decisions were made to let the Emperor rule over his small court in the New Summer Palace. He would be treated as a ruler of a separate country and have expenses of several million taels in silver.

== Establishment of the Republic of China ==
=== Proclamation of the ROC ===
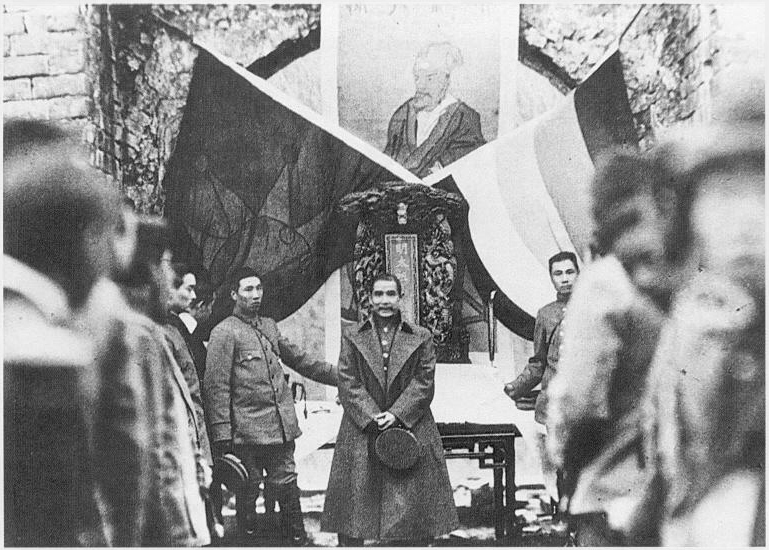
Sun Yat-sen and other members of the Government of the Republic of China visited the mausoleum of the Hongwu Emperor of the Ming dynasty, 15 February 1912

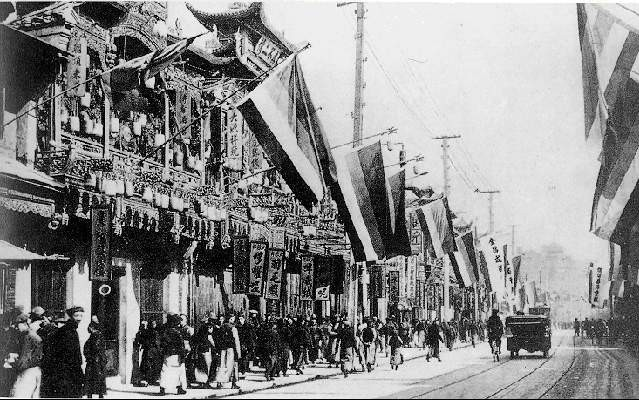
Five Races Under One Union flags flying over Nanjing Road in Shanghai

On 29 December 1911, Sun Yat-sen was elected as the first provisional president, and 1 January 1912 was set as the first day of the First Year of the Republic of China. On 3 January, the representatives recommended Li Yuanhong as the Provisional Vice-president.

During and after the 1911 Revolution, many groups that participated wanted their own pennant as the national flag. During the Wuchang Uprising, the military units of Wuchang wanted the nine-star flag with a taijitu. Others in competition included Lu Haodong's Blue Sky with a White Sun flag. Huang Xing preferred a flag bearing the mythical "well-field" system of village agriculture. In the end, the assembly compromised: the national flag would be the banner of Five Races Under One Union. The Five Races Under One Union flag with horizontal stripes represented the five major nationalities of the republic. The red represented Han, the yellow represented Manchus, the blue for Mongols, the white for Muslims, and the black for Tibetans. Although the general targets of the uprisings were the Manchus, Sun Yat-sen, Song Jiaoren and Huang Xing advocated racial integration to be carried out from the mainland to the frontiers.

=== Donghuamen Incident ===
On 16 January, while returning to his residence, Yuan was ambushed in a bomb attack that was organized by the Tongmenghui in Donghuamen, Beijing. Eighteen revolutionaries were involved. About ten guards died, but Yuan himself was not seriously injured. He sent a message to the revolutionaries the next day that pledged his loyalty and asked them to organize no more assassination attempts against him.

=== Abdication of the Emperor ===
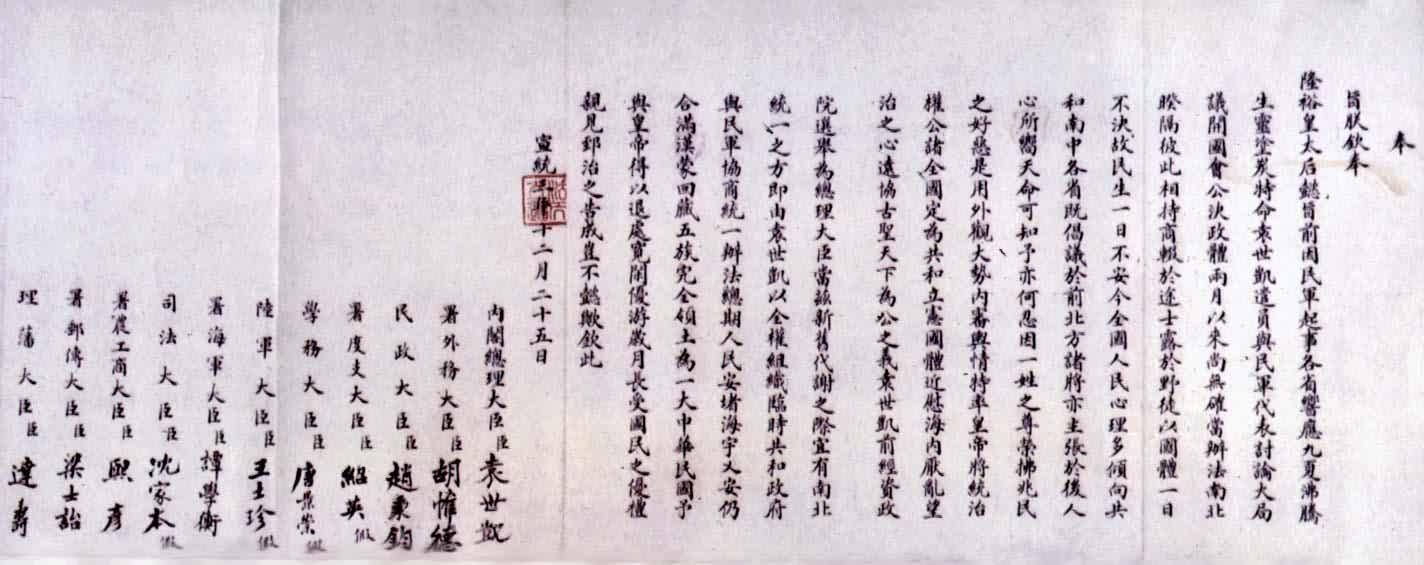
Imperial edict for the abdication

Zhang Jian drafted an abdication proposal, which was approved by the Provisional Senate. On 20 January, Wu Tingfang of the Nanking Provisional Government officially delivered the Imperial Edict of Abdication to Yuan Shikai for the abdication of Puyi. On 22 January, Sun Yat-sen announced that he would resign the presidency in favor of Yuan Shikai if the latter supported the Emperor's abdication. Yuan then pressured Empress Dowager Longyu and threatened that the imperial family would be killed if the abdication did not come before the revolutionaries reached Beijing, but he stated that if the Emperor agreed to abdicate, the provisional government would honor the terms proposed by the imperial family.

On 3 February, Longyu gave Yuan full permission to negotiate the abdication terms of the Qing emperor. Yuan then drew up his own version and forwarded it to the revolutionaries on 3 February. His version had three, instead of two, sections. On 12 February, after they were pressured by Yuan and other ministers, the six-year-old Puyi and Empress Dowager Longyu accepted Yuan's terms of abdication.

=== Capital location debate ===
As a condition for ceding leadership to Yuan, Sun insisted that the provisional government remain in Nanjing. On 14 February, the Provisional Senate initially voted 20–5 for making Beijing the capital over Nanjing, with two votes going for Wuhan and one for Tianjin. The Senate majority wanted to secure the peace agreement by taking power in Beijing. Zhang Jian and others reasoned that having the capital in Beijing would prevent restoration of the Manchus and the secession of the Mongols. However, Sun and Huang Xing argued for Nanjing to balance against Yuan's power base in the north. Li Yuanhong presented Wuhan as a compromise. The next day, the Provisional Senate voted again, this time 19–6, for Nanjing, with two votes for Wuhan.

Sun sent a delegation led by Cai Yuanpei and Wang Jingwei to persuade Yuan to move to Nanjing. Yuan welcomed the delegation and agreed to accompany the delegates back to the south. Then on the evening of 29 February, riots and fires broke out all over the city. They were allegedly started by disobedient troops of Cao Kun, an officer loyal to Yuan. The disorder gave Yuan a pretext to stay in the north to guard against unrest. On 10 March, Yuan was inaugurated in Beijing as the Provisional President of the Republic of China. On 5 April, the Provisional Senate in Nanjing voted to make Beijing the capital of the Republic and convened in Beijing at the end of the month.

== Government established in Beijing ==
=== Yuan took the power ===
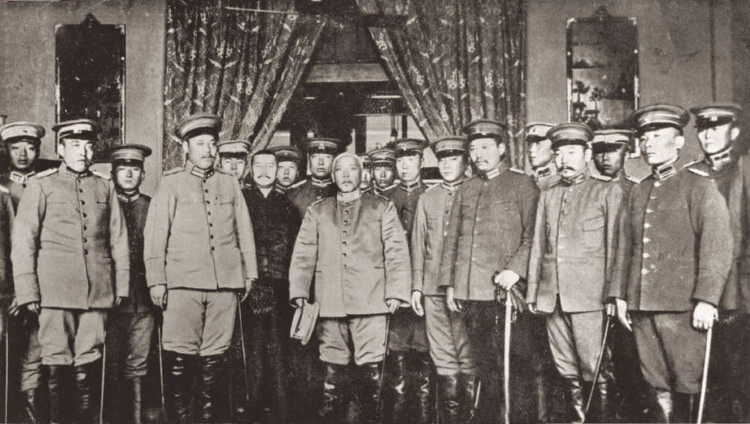
Yuan Shikai swearing in as the Provisional President in Beijing

On 10 March 1912, Yuan Shikai was sworn as the second Provisional President of the Republic of China in Beijing. The first National Assembly election took place according to the Provisional Constitution. While in Beijing, the Kuomintang was formed on 25 August 1912. The Nationalists held the majority of seats after the election. Song Jiaoren was elected as premier. However, Song was assassinated in Shanghai on 20 March 1913 under a secret order by Yuan.

On April 1, Sun Yat-sen was relieved of office in Nanjing. On April 2, the Provisional Senate resolved to move the Provisional Government to Beijing. On April 4, the Provisional Senate resolved to relocate itself to Beijing, and it adjourned on April 8. On April 29, the Beijing Provisional Senate held its opening ceremony. On May 1, the Senate held a new election for its speakership, electing Wu Jinglian as Speaker and Tang Hualong as Deputy Speaker.

In May, the Beijing Provisional Senate deliberated on the case for unifying the national flag. On May 14, the Provisional Senate resolved that the Five-Colored Flag would be the national flag; that the Eighteen-Star Flag placed in the upper-left corner occupying one quarter of the Five-Colored Flag would be the army flag; and that the Blue Sky with a White Sun flag placed in the upper-left corner occupying one quarter of the Five-Colored Flag would be the navy flag, with the merchant flag following the national, army, and navy flags. When this case was submitted to Yuan Shikai, Yuan proposed that the Eighteen-Star Flag still serve as the army flag and the Blue Sky with a White Sun flag as the navy flag; this was passed by the Provisional Senate on June 5. On June 11, the case was promulgated and put into effect by Yuan Shikai through a Provisional Presidential Decree.

=== Recognition from foreign countries ===
After the Wuchang Uprising, the foreign powers with major interests in China adopted a wait-and-see attitude, seeking to identify which faction—within either the Beijing government or the Wuchang government—would best serve their respective interests and thus merit their support. On April 8, 1913, the first popularly elected National Assembly of the Republic of China was formally inaugurated, and Brazil became the first to officially recognize the Republic of China on that very day, with other countries following suit. On April 9, 1913, Peru; on May 2, Mexico; and on May 4, Cuba recognized the Republic of China. On May 2, 1913, the United States was the first among the great powers to recognize the Republic of China. On October 7, 1913, thirteen countries—United Kingdom, France, Russia, Germany, Japan, Italy, Austria-Hungary, Netherlands, Belgium, Portugal, Spain, Denmark, and Sweden—simultaneously announced their recognition of the Republic of China.

=== Proposed Han monarchy ===
Some advocated that an ethnic Han be installed as Emperor of China, either a descendant of Confucius who held the noble title of the Duke of Yansheng or a descendant of the Ming imperial family who had the title of the Marquis of Extended Grace. The Duke of Yansheng was proposed as a candidate for emperorship by Liang Qichao.

The Han hereditary aristocratic nobility, like the Duke of Yansheng, was retained by the new Republic of China, and the title's holders continued to receive their pensions. A plan backed by foreign bankers was reportedly in place to declare the Duke of Yansheng as Emperor of China if the revolutionaries' republican cause had failed.

=== Yuan proclaimed as the Chinese emperor ===
On October 6, 1913, Yuan Shikai was formally elected President of the Republic of China through a vote by the National Assembly. After taking office, Yuan insisted on a strong central government and cut off attempts by some revolutionaries to have their provinces declare independence. At the same time, Yuan actively negotiated with the foreign powers to preserve China's sovereignty over Mongolia and Tibet.

However, in 1915 Yuan Shikai abolished the republic and proclaimed himself emperor, which met with opposition and triggered the National Protection War; Yuan soon announced the cancellation of the monarchy. On June 6, 1916, Yuan died of illness, and Li Yuanhong succeeded him as President, with China entering a period of warlord fragmentation among the provinces and regions.

== Legacy ==
=== Social influence ===
After the revolution, there was a huge outpouring of anti-Manchu sentiment through China, particularly in Beijing, where thousands died in anti-Manchu violence. Imperial restrictions on Han residency and behavior within the city crumbled with the Manchu's imperial power. Anti-Manchu sentiment is recorded in books like A Short History of Slaves (奴才小史) and The Biographies of Avaricious Officials and Corrupt Personnel (貪官污吏傳) by Laoli (老吏).

During the abdication of the last Emperor, Yuan Shikai and Sun Yat-sen tried to adopt the concept of "Manchu and Han as one family" (滿漢一家). People started exploring and debating with themselves on the root cause of their national weakness. The new search of identity was the New Culture Movement. Manchu culture and language, on the contrary, became virtually extinct by 2007.

Unlike revolutions in the West, the 1911 Revolution did not restructure society. Most participants in the 1911 Revolution were military personnel, traditional bureaucrats, and local gentries and kept their regional power afterward. Some became warlords. There were no major improvements in the standard of living. The writer Lu Xun commented in 1921 during the publishing of The True Story of Ah Q, ten years after the 1911 Revolution, that basically nothing had changed except "the Manchus have left the kitchen." Economic problems were not addressed until the governance of Chiang Ching-kuo in Taiwan and Mao Zedong in mainland China.

The 1911 Revolution mainly got rid of feudalism (fengjian) from the late imperial period. The usual view of historians has two restorations of feudal power after the revolution: Yuan Shikai, followed by Zhang Xun. The effects of anti-Manchu sentiment after the revolution caused the Manchus of the Metropolitan Banners to be driven into deep poverty. Manchu men were too impoverished to marry, Han men married Manchu women, and the Manchus stopped dressing in Manchu clothing and practicing Manchu traditions.

=== Historical significance ===
The 1911 Revolution overthrew the Qing government and four thousand years of monarchy. Throughout Chinese history, old dynasties had always been replaced by new dynasties. The 1911 Revolution, however, was the first to overthrow a monarchy completely and attempt to establish a republic to spread democratic ideas throughout China. In 1911 at the provisional government proclamation ceremony, Sun Yat-sen said, "The revolution is not yet successful, the comrades still need to strive for the future." (革命尚未成功，同志仍需努力).

Since the 1950s, both Chinas have seen the 1911 Revolution quite differently. Both recognize Sun Yat-sen as the Father of the Nation, but in Taiwan, "Father of the Republic of China" is meant.

In Mainland China, Sun Yat-sen was seen as the man who helped bring down the Qing, a precondition for the communist state that was founded in 1949. It views Sun's work as the first step toward the real revolution in 1949, when the communists set up a truly-independent state, which expelled foreigners and built a military and industrial power. The father of Communist China is seen as Mao Zedong. In 1954, Liu Shaoqi was quoted as saying that the "1911 Revolution inserted the concept of a republic into common people". Zhou Enlai pointed out that the "1911 Revolution overthrew the Qing rule, ended 4,000 years of monarchy, and liberated the mind of people to a great extent, and opened up the path for the development of future revolution. This is a great victory."

=== Modern evaluation ===
A change in the belief that the revolution had been a generally positive began in the late 1980s and 1990s, but Zhang Shizhao was quoted as arguing, "When talking about the 1911 Revolution, the theorist these days tends to overemphasize. The word 'success' was way overused."

The degree of success of democracy gained by the revolution can vary depending on one's view. Even after Sun Yat-sen died in 1925, the Nationalists controlled for sixty years all five branches of the government in Taiwan, and none was independent. Yan Jiaqi, the founder of the Federation for a Democratic China, has said that Sun Yat-sen is to be credited as founding China's first republic in 1912, and the second republic is the people of Taiwan and the political parties, which now democratize the region.

Meanwhile, the ideals of democracy are far from realised in mainland China. For example, the former Chinese Premier Wen Jiabao once said in a speech that without real democracy, there is no guarantee of economic and political rights, but he led a 2011 crackdown against the Chinese jasmine protests. Others, such as Qin Yongmin of the Democracy Party of China, who was imprisoned for twelve years, do not praise the 1911 Revolution. Qin said that the revolution only replaced one dictator with another and that Mao is not an emperor but worse than the emperor.

=== Media ===
One of Japan's earliest film companies (M. Pathe, owned by Sun supporter Shōkichi Umeya) documented the success of the revolution from the Wuchang uprising and to Sun's inauguration and produced three documentary films that covered the revolution.

== See also ==
- 1911 (film)
- The Battle for the Republic of China
- Republic of China Armed Forces
- Republic of China calendar
- National Revolutionary Army
- Timeline of late anti-Qing rebellions
- Qiu Jin
- Monarchy of China

== Sources ==
- Fenby, Jonathan (2008). The Penguin History of Modern China. London: A. Lane. ISBN 978-0-7139-9832-0.
- Gao, James Zheng (2009). Historical dictionary of modern China (1800–1949). Scarecrow. ISBN 978-0-8108-4930-3.
- Rhoads, Edward J. M. (2017). Manchus and Han: Ethnic Relations and Political Power in Late Qing and Early Republican China, 1861–1928. Studies on Ethnic Groups in China. University of Washington Press. ISBN 978-0-2959-9748-3.
- Wang, Ke-wen (1998). Modern China: An Encyclopedia of History, Culture, and Nationalism. Taylor & Francis. ISBN 978-0-8153-0720-4.
