= The Southeast Daily =

Defunct newspaper in China

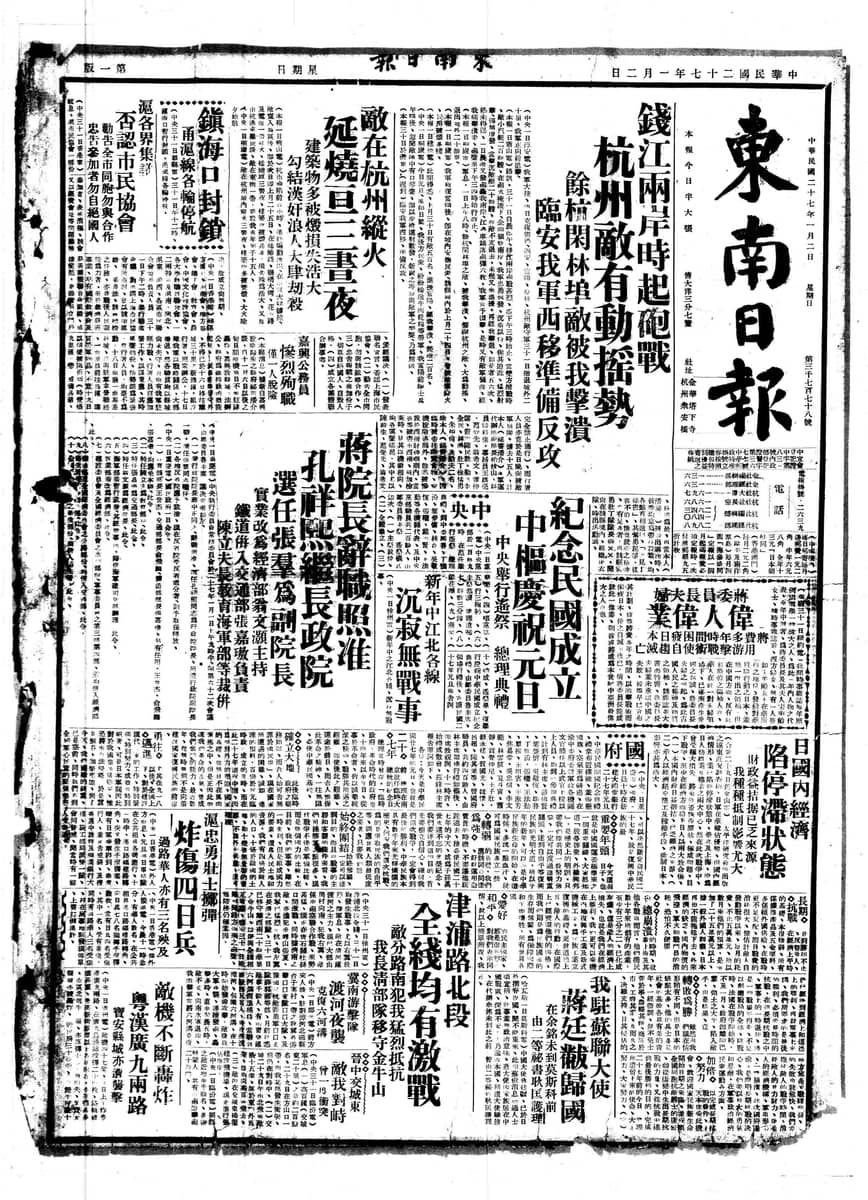
- Southeast Daily, Jinhua Edition (January 2, 1938)
- Type: Daily newspaper, official newspaper
- Owner(s): Southeast News Co., Ltd.
- Founder(s): Kuomintang; Zhejiang Provincial Party Committee
- President: Hu Jianzhong
- Launched: March 12, 1927 (Hangzhou Republic Daily was founded)
- Ceased publication: May 3, 1949 (Hangzhou edition of the Southeast Daily ceased publication)
- Political alignment: Pro-Kuomintang, Pro-nationalist government
- Language: Standard Chinese
- Headquarters: No. 377 Nanjing West Road, Shanghai
- City: Hangzhou, Shanghai
- Country: China

The Southeast Daily was a newspaper in Zhejiang during the Republic of China period. It was reorganized from the official newspaper of the Zhejiang Provincial Party Committee of the Kuomintang, the Hangzhou Republic of China Daily. It was run between the party and party members and was affiliated to the Southeast News Enterprise Co., Ltd. On March 12, 1927, the Hangzhou Republic of China Daily was founded, and then it was suspended and reorganized due to the Kuomintang's purge. From 1928, Hu Jianzhong served as editor-in-chief, and later became president. He reformed the newspaper and expanded its influence, with "party stance and liberal color" as the editorial policy. In June 1934, the Hangzhou Republic of China Daily was renamed the Southeast Daily, and a joint-stock company was established to implement public-private partnership.

During the Second Sino-Japanese War, the Southeast Daily moved south and established the Jinhua edition, which was then divided into the Lishui edition and the Jiangshan edition. The Lishui edition was changed to the Yunhe County edition, and the Jiangshan edition was changed to the Nanping edition. After the Second Sino-Japanese War, the Yunhe edition was changed to the Hangzhou edition, and the Nanping edition was changed to the Shanghai edition. In May 1949, the Southeast Daily ceased publication. After the Chinese Communist Party (CCP) captured Hangzhou in 1949, the Southeast Daily was taken over by the Zhejiang Daily.

== History ==
=== Early history ===
In February 1927, the National Revolutionary Army occupied Hangzhou. On March 12, 1927, the Zhejiang Provincial Party Committee founded the Hangzhou Republic Daily at the Youji Guild Hall on the west side of Yangxuenong, Xingwu Road (now Kaiyuan Road) in Hangzhou County. As the newspaper sponsored by the Zhejiang Provincial Party Committee of the Kuomintang after the First United Front, it was directly under the Propaganda Department of the Provincial Party Committee and was led by the Party Newspaper Management Committee. Xuan Zhonghua, a member of the Chinese Communist Party, concurrently served as the director of the Social Affairs Committee of the Hangzhou Republic Daily, and Zhang Liusheng served as the general manager. Yang Xianjiang, Dai Bangding and Tang Gongxian successively served as chief editors. At that time, it mainly promoted Sun Yat-sen's Three Principles of the People and the policies of the First United Front, and support for farmers and workers, while supporting the rights of workers and farmers and developing and strengthening the left-wing team of the Kuomintang. Therefore, although the newspaper was established in the name of the Kuomintang party newspaper, most of the main responsible persons actually leaned towards the CCP and competed with the Hangzhou National News sponsored by the Kuomintang military system in Hangzhou on the same day.

In April 1927, the Kuomintang carried out a purge in Hangzhou, which led to the suspension and forced reorganization of the Hangzhou Republic Daily. On April 11, many members of the CCP, including Xuan Zhonghua, Tang Gongxian, and Chen Shiding, were arrested and killed. Afterwards, the Hangzhou Republic Daily resumed publication on April 14 under the control of the right-wing Kuomintang. Within a year after the Hangzhou Republic Daily was reorganized by the right-wing Kuomintang, the newspaper experienced a change of 7 presidents. Before the 1930s, the Hangzhou Republic Daily had a relatively limited influence, with a daily circulation of about 2,000 to 3,000 or 3,000 to 4,000 copies. In April 1928, the Zhejiang Provincial Department of the Kuomintang was reorganized, and Xu Shaodi served as the Minister of Propaganda and concurrently served as the president of the Hangzhou Republic Daily. He invited his Fudan University classmate Hu Jianzhong to serve as the editor-in-chief.

In May 1929, the Zhejiang Provincial Government decided to temporarily cancel the "25% rent reduction" policy, which triggered strong opposition from the Hangzhou Republic Daily. The policy was originally formulated by the Kuomintang according to Sun Yat-sen's legacy and aimed to improve the living conditions of farmers. The Hangzhou Republic Daily stood on the position of the Zhejiang Provincial Party Committee of the Kuomintang and published articles in succession to support the "25% rent reduction", which led to opposition to Zhang Jingjiang's provincial government. In particular, on April 29, Hu Jianzhong's editorial on the robbery of the Bank of China in Jiaxing attributed the cause of the case to the inequality between the rich and the poor, indirectly criticizing the provincial government's policy, which aroused strong dissatisfaction from the provincial government. On April 30, the provincial government ordered the Hangzhou Republic Daily to stop publishing from May 1 on the grounds that the article was "far-fetched, criticized the government, deliberately instigated a trend, and was harmful to local public security." At that time, Hu Jianzhong was escorted to the Kuomintang Central Party Committee in Nanjing for processing. At the Kuomintang Central Party Committee, Ye Chucang and Chen Guofu expressed their comfort to Hu Jianzhong and sent Tao Xisheng to Hangzhou for mediation. Subsequently, the Hangzhou Republic Daily also resumed publication on the 28th of the same month.

=== Growth ===
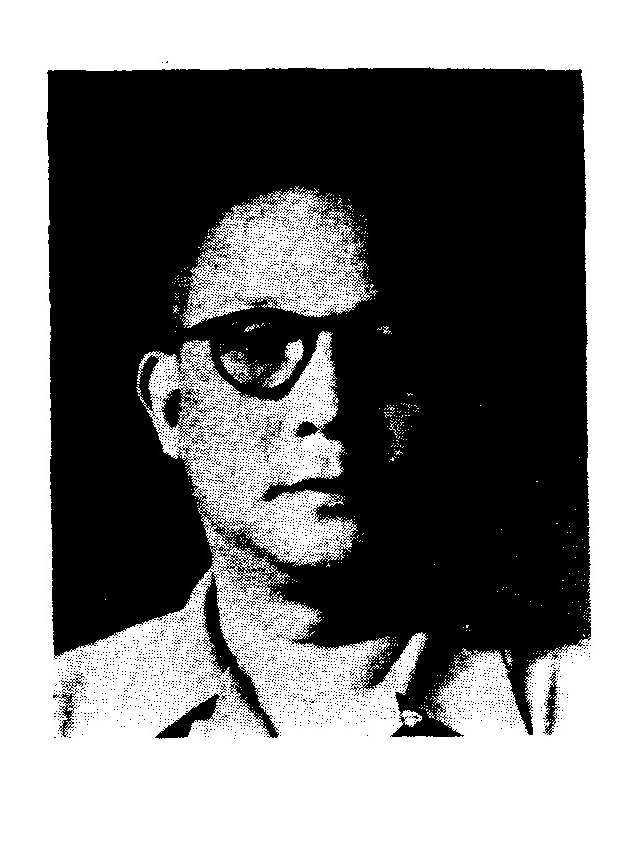
Hu Jianzhong

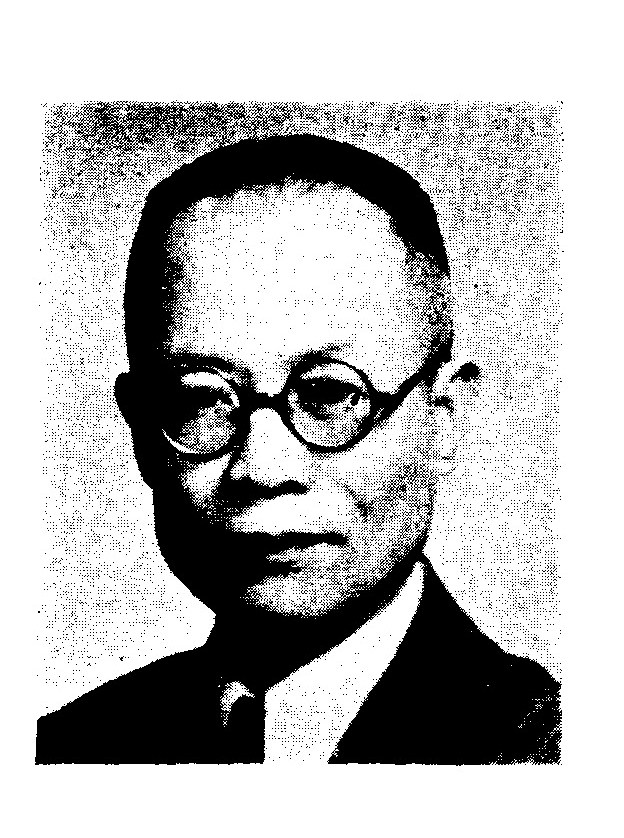
Xu Shaodi

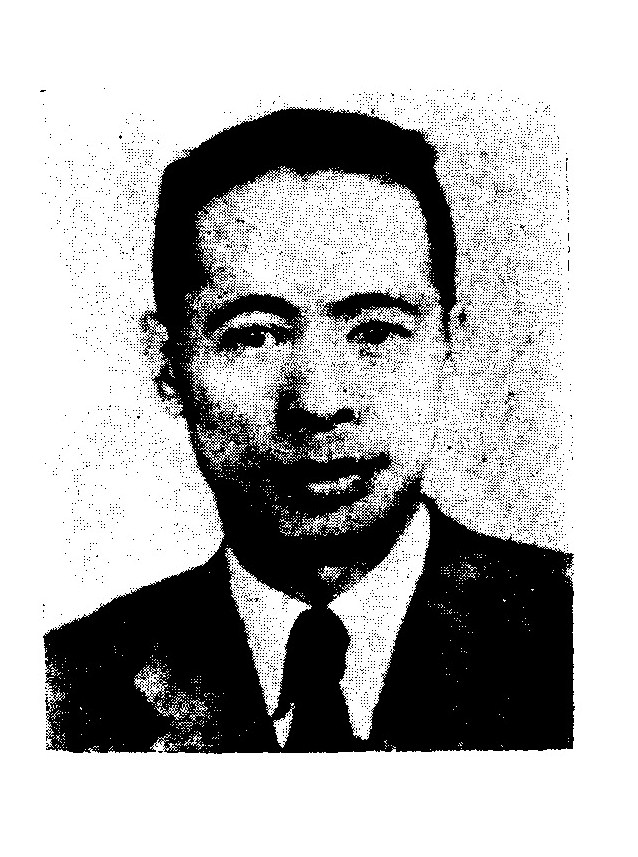
Liu Xiangnu

The core figures of Southeast Daily

From 1930, Hu Jianzhong served as the president and concurrently served as the editor-in-chief; from the winter of 1931 to the second half of 1933, the position of editor-in-chief was successively taken over by Xu Shiheng and Liu Xiangnv. When Hu Jianzhong became the president, he began to actively reform the newspaper, including recruiting more field reporters, improving printing equipment and conditions, and at the same time changing the advertising business from outsourcing to self-operation by the newspaper to increase revenue. On the basis of these reforms, the content of the newspaper was enriched, such as adding the "Exclusive Interview with Our Newspaper" section, and attracting exclusive news reports with higher remuneration. The layout of the page and the content of the supplement were also adjusted accordingly.

The Kuomintang took the lead in Hangzhou Republic Daily, and with the party and government newspapers in various regions as the backbone, it basically formed a network of Kuomintang newspapers throughout the province. At the beginning of 1933, the daily sales of Hangzhou Republic Daily were close to 10,000 copies, and the original lithographic printing press could no longer meet the demand. Therefore, the newspaper decided to invest in a new rotary press and paper press, and began to use it in September of the same year. This was not only the first time that a rotary press was used for printing in Hangzhou and even in the entire Zhejiang Province, but also realized color printing. With the improvement of newspaper content and format, as well as the improvement of printing speed and quality, coupled with the westward extension of the Zhejiang-Jiangxi Railway, Hangzhou Republic Daily provided new development opportunities. With its geographical advantage, the newspaper was able to compete with major newspapers in Shanghai in terms of distribution, and its distribution in western Zhejiang and Jiangxi and Fujian regions often reached readers one day earlier than newspapers in Shanghai.

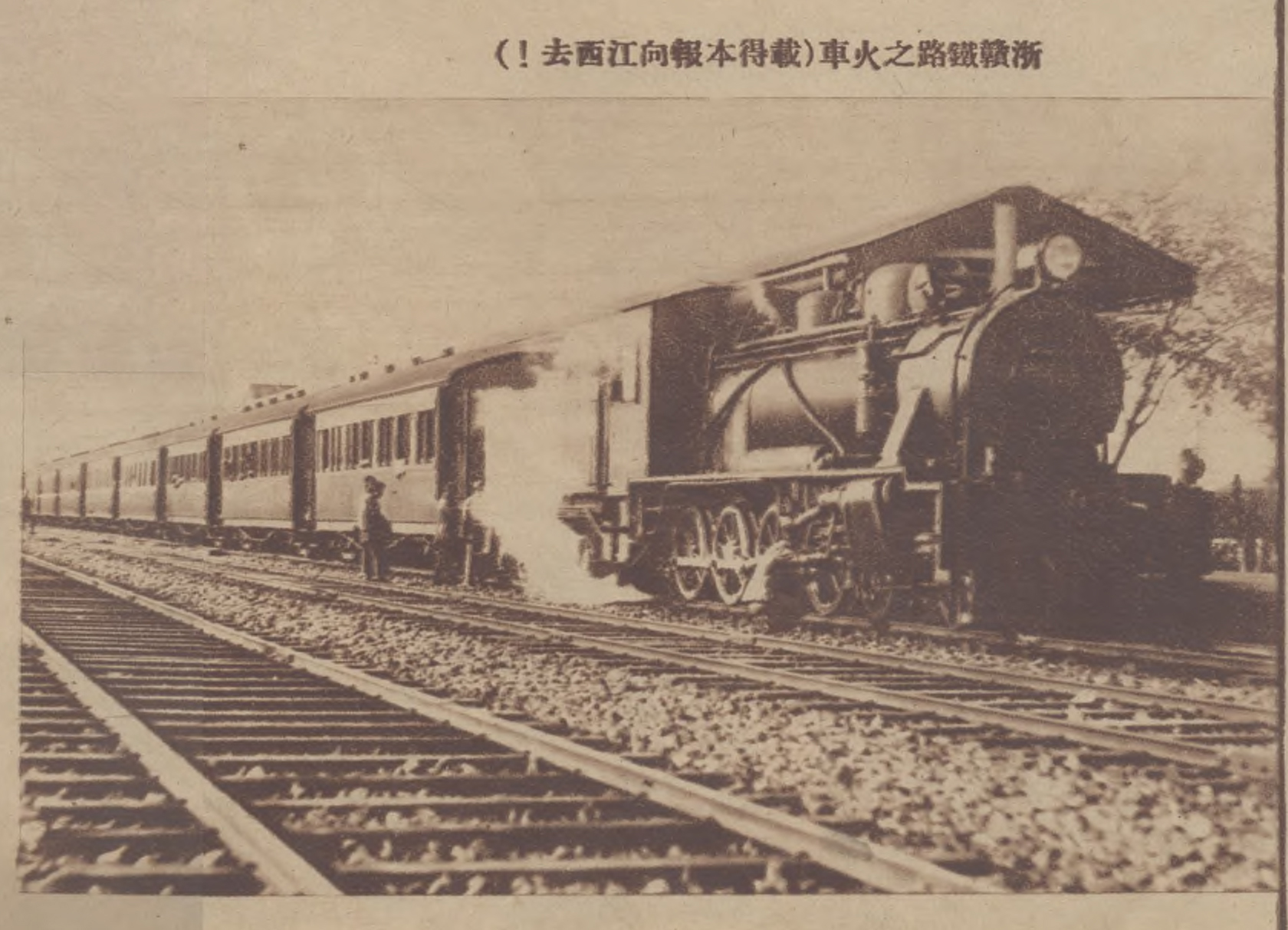
The train of the Zhejiang-Jiangxi Railway (carrying the Southeast Daily to Jiangxi!)

In order to break through the original geographical limitations of the Hangzhou Republic Daily and expand to the southeastern region of China, on June 16, 1934, the Hangzhou Republic Daily was renamed the Southeast Daily. At the same time, the Southeast Daily Co., Ltd. was established. During this period, the Southeast Daily Co., Ltd. performed well in operations, allowing the newspaper's highest daily circulation to reach 35,000 copies. It is widely circulated in Zhejiang, southern Jiangsu, northern Fujian, southern Anhui, eastern Jiangxi and other regions. Its influence and circulation are far ahead of its peers in the Hangzhou area, and it even caught up with the veteran Ta Kung Pao (1902–1949). Hu Jianzhong, the then president of the Southeast Daily, was as famous as Hu Zhengzhi, the president of the Ta Kung Pao, and was hailed as "the two hus of the north and the south, rivals of the time."

=== Wartime migration ===
After the July 7 Incident, the Southeast Daily sent war correspondents to get the latest news while preparing to evacuate Hangzhou and move its personnel and equipment south. On November 19, it changed its publishing location to Jinhua, and the newspaper office was located in the Jiang Clan Ancestral Hall of Taxia Temple in Jinhua City; Hangzhou only published special editions until December 22. On December 24, the Japanese army occupied Hangzhou, and the Southeast Daily Building was used as the Japanese military police headquarters. At the end of 1937, Huang Shaohong came to Zhejiang to take charge of the government and prepare for war. His "Zhejiang Province Wartime Political Program" was rejected by the Southeast Daily. For this reason, the Zhejiang Provincial Government opened the Zhejiang Tide on its own on February 24, 1938.

On July 7, 1939, the newspaper office moved to Wangfudun outside Jinhua. In 1941, the Japanese army sneaked across the Qiantang River and Jinhua was in a state of emergency. The Southeast Daily moved in two ways: one moved to Lishui, published the Lishui edition from May 1 to August 31, and then withdrew to Jinhua; the other retreated to Jiangshan, published an extra edition, and returned to Jinhua on June 1. After withdrawing to Jinhua, offices were set up in Lishui and Jiangshan, and printing equipment was reserved in case of unexpected events. The Southeast Daily Office continued to operate, and during its time in Jinhua, the daily circulation of the newspaper reached 20,000 copies.

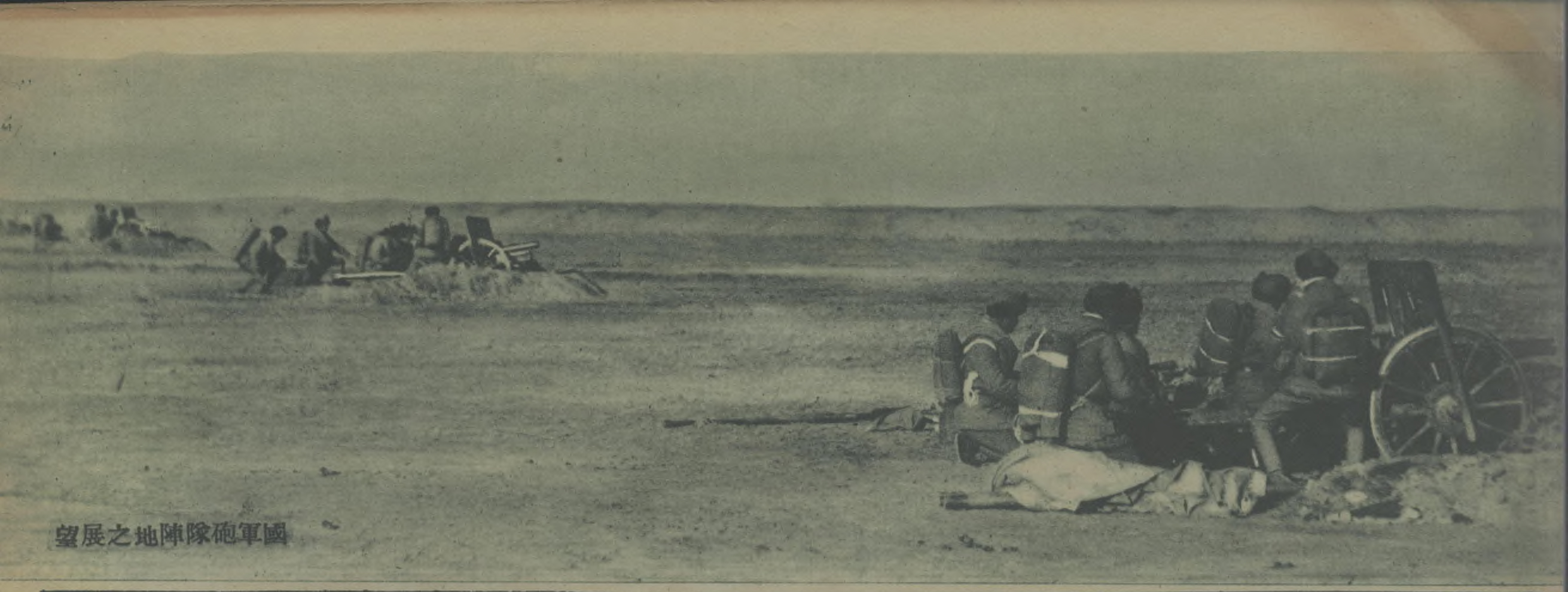
Prospects of the National Army Artillery Positions

In May 1942, the Zhejiang-Jiangxi Campaign broke out. The magazine was suspended on May 20 and moved in two directions:

- The first group, led by Liu Xiangnu, went to Lishui. In May 1942, after briefly resuming the Lishui edition, the Japanese army occupied Lishui from May 23 to August 28. On November 23, the Lishui edition was resumed again in Shangshuinan, Lishui. On March 31, 1943, the Japanese army bombed Lishui, and the Lishui branch was bombed, so it was suspended for ten days. On August 26, 1944, the Japanese army occupied Lishui again, and the Lishui edition was suspended from August 21 to October 10. It was resumed in Yunhe on December 8 and renamed the Yunhe edition.
- The second group, led by Hu Jianzhong, went to Jiangshan. On May 26, 1942, the Jiangshan edition issued an extra edition. On June 4, due to the invasion of the Japanese army, the newspaper began to move again and moved to Nanping, Fujian. On August 21, 1942, the Nanping edition was launched. In the autumn of 1943, Hu Jianzhong went to Chongqing to serve as the chief editor of the Central Daily News and concurrently served as the editor-in-chief of the Southeast Daily. Zhu Juying acted as the agent to handle the affairs of the newspaper. The circulation remained at about 10,000 copies.

During the eight-year Anti-Japanese War, more than 60 employees and their families were unfortunately bombed by enemy planes or died of illness, accounting for almost 10% of the total number of employees in the newspaper. Despite facing great difficulties, the Southeast Daily still actively promoted the anti-Japanese spirit. During the war, the daily circulation of the Southeast Daily remained at 18,000 copies, becoming an important "ink fortress and pen fortress" in the southeast region.

=== Post-war development ===
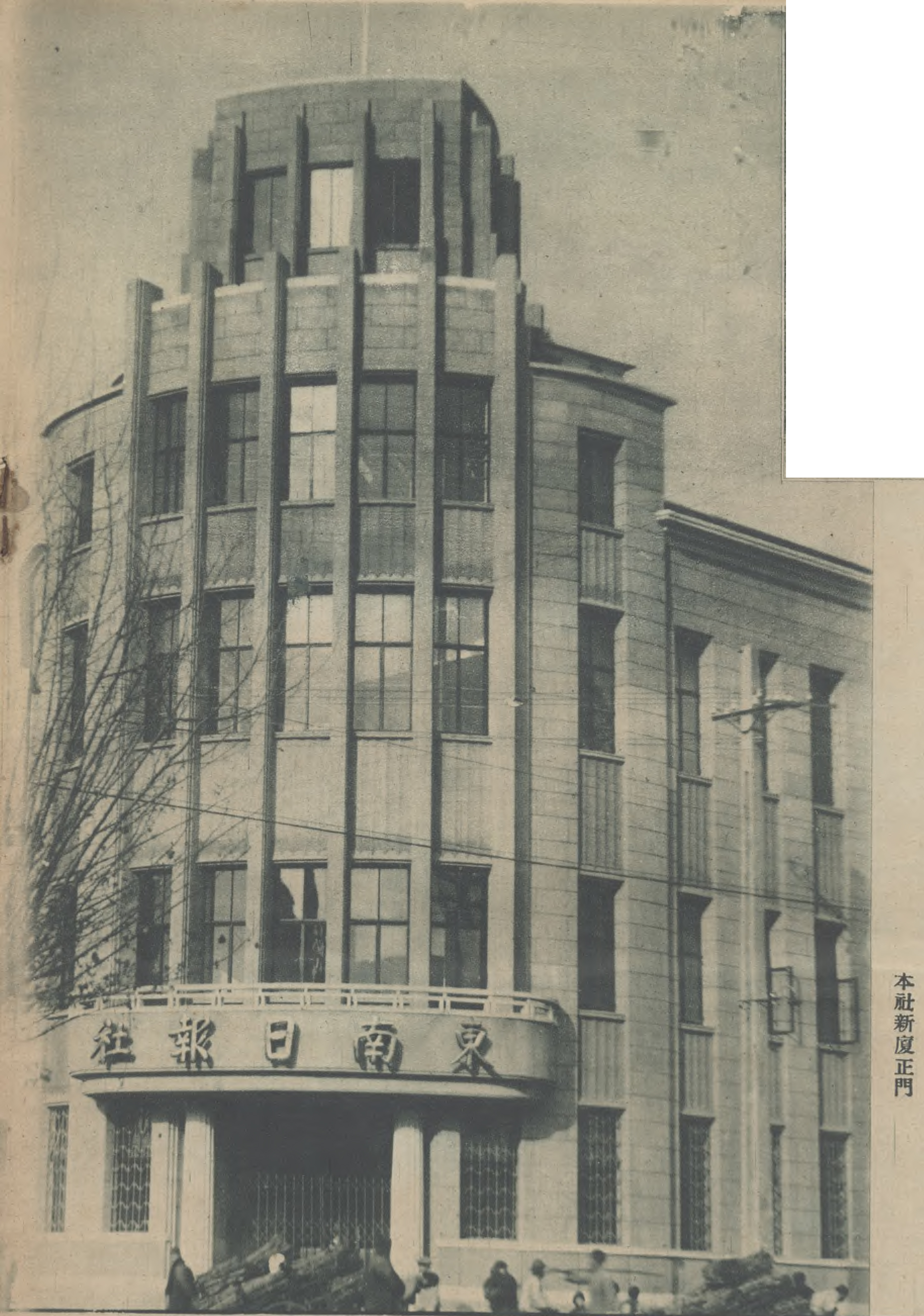
The main entrance of the new building of the Southeast Daily News

After the Second Sino-Japanese War, the Yunhe branch was the first to send people back to Hangzhou to prepare for the publication. It was first published jointly with the National Righteousness Newspaper, and resumed publication in Hangzhou on September 1. On September 11, the Southeast Daily Building at Zhong'an Bridge in Hangzhou was taken back, and Liu Xiangnv was appointed as the acting president. In November, the Nanping edition reporter participated in the Japanese surrender ceremony in Taiwan and published a headline report, which was exclusive among mainland Chinese newspapers at the time.

In December, the Nanping edition stopped publishing. Xu Shaodi and Liu Xiangnu planned to change the Hangzhou branch to the head office and set up a branch in Nanping to continue publishing, but Hu Jianzhong, who was stranded in Chongqing, refused. Hu Jianzhong began to arrange to transfer the Nanping edition to Shanghai for publication. Hu Jianzhong invited Liu Xiangnu to go to Shanghai to assist in the establishment of the newspaper, but Liu Xiangnu refused to serve as Hu Jianzhong's subordinate.

In June 1946, Hu Jianzhong resigned as the president of the Central Daily News. On June 16, the Nanping edition was changed to the Shanghai edition, and the publication was resumed in Shanghai. An office was also set up in Nanjing. During this period, Chen Bulei assisted in purchasing materials and equipment in US dollars. In the second half of 1946, Hu Jianzhong handed over the post of president of the Hangzhou newspaper to Xu Shaodi, thus removing Liu Xiang from the post of acting president. On March 10, 1948, the Southeast Daily Co., Ltd. was renamed the Southeast News Enterprise Co., Ltd., with its headquarters in Shanghai and a branch in Hangzhou. In addition to the staff of the newspaper, Chen Guofu, Chen Lifu, Jiang Jingguo, Chen Bulei, and Zhang Daofan all participated in the shares.

In October 1948, after the People's Liberation Army won the Liaoshen Campaign, the Nationalist government began to retreat to Taiwan. In October 1948, Zhejiang University student leader Yu Zisan was secretly arrested and died in prison. The authorities published a report about Yu Zisan's "suicide for fear of crime" through the "Southeast Daily", which triggered student protests. In the same month, Hu Jianzhong directed the establishment of a "contingency committee" to plan to send Shanghai newspaper staff and facilities directly to Taiwan, and Hangzhou newspapers to Hengyang, Hunan, and then to Taiwan via Guangzhou. In January 1949, the newspaper's printing equipment and more than 100 tons of white newspapers sank with the Taiping during the transportation to Taiwan. In addition, the Hangzhou newspaper staff refused to go to Hengyang and other reasons, so the plan to resume publication in Taiwan fell through.

In April 1949, as the People's Liberation Army launched the Battle of Crossing the Yangtze River, Liu Xiangnu, the vice president of the Southeast Daily, and her family left Hangzhou, causing the newspaper's operation to fall into trouble. The newspaper's employees spontaneously formed an "employee emergency meeting" to take over the newspaper, set up a workers' picket team, and supported the employees through part of the income and the purchase of rice and non-stable food The Hangzhou edition of the Southeast Daily finally stopped publishing on May 3, 1949, and the Shanghai edition continued to operate until April 30, 1949. After the People's Liberation Army occupied Hangzhou, with the assistance of the newspaper's employees, the newspaper's buildings, property and equipment were handed over intact to the Communist authorities and used to establish the Zhejiang Daily.

== Content ==
=== Position ===
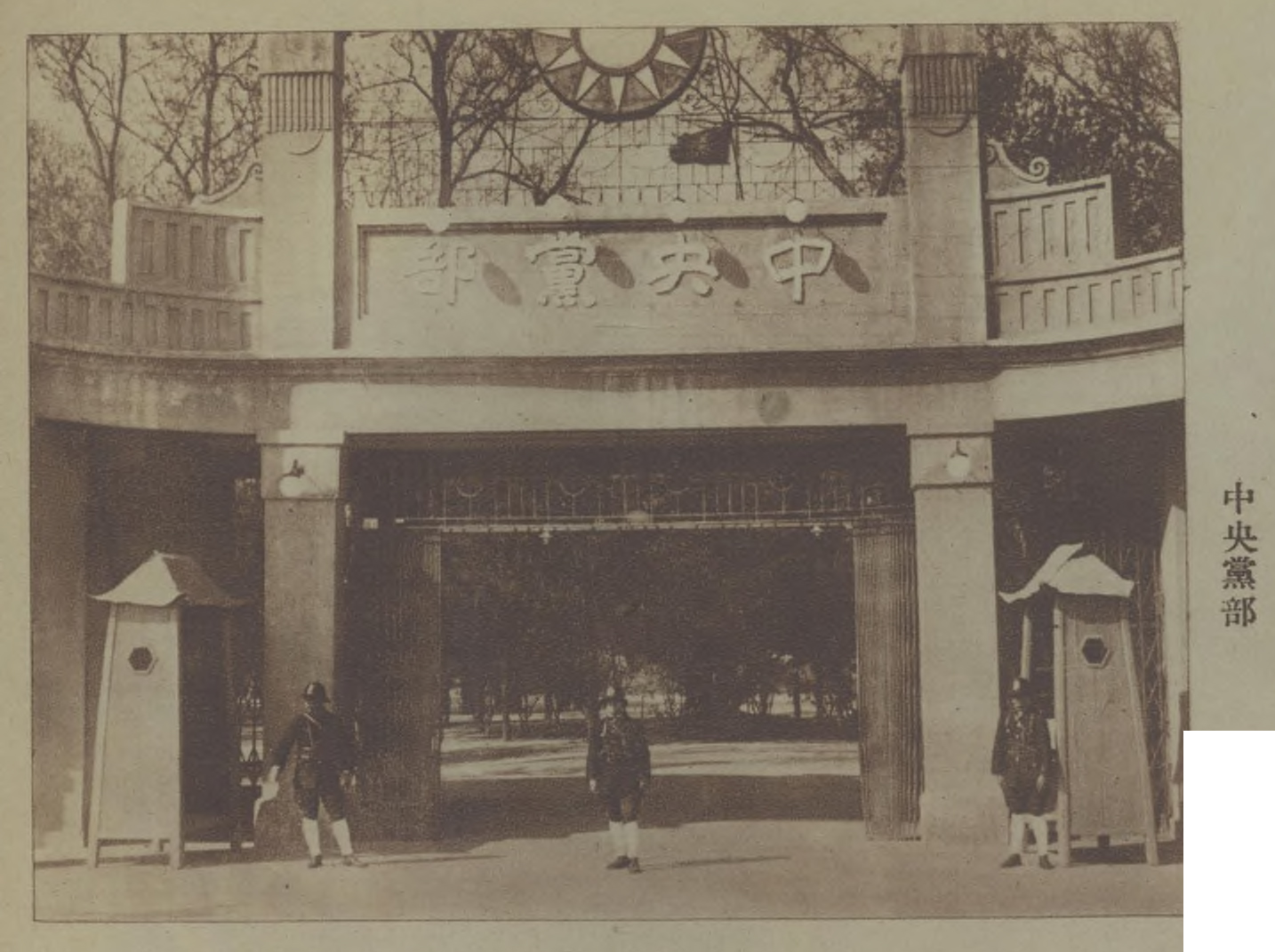
Kuomintang Central Party Headquarters

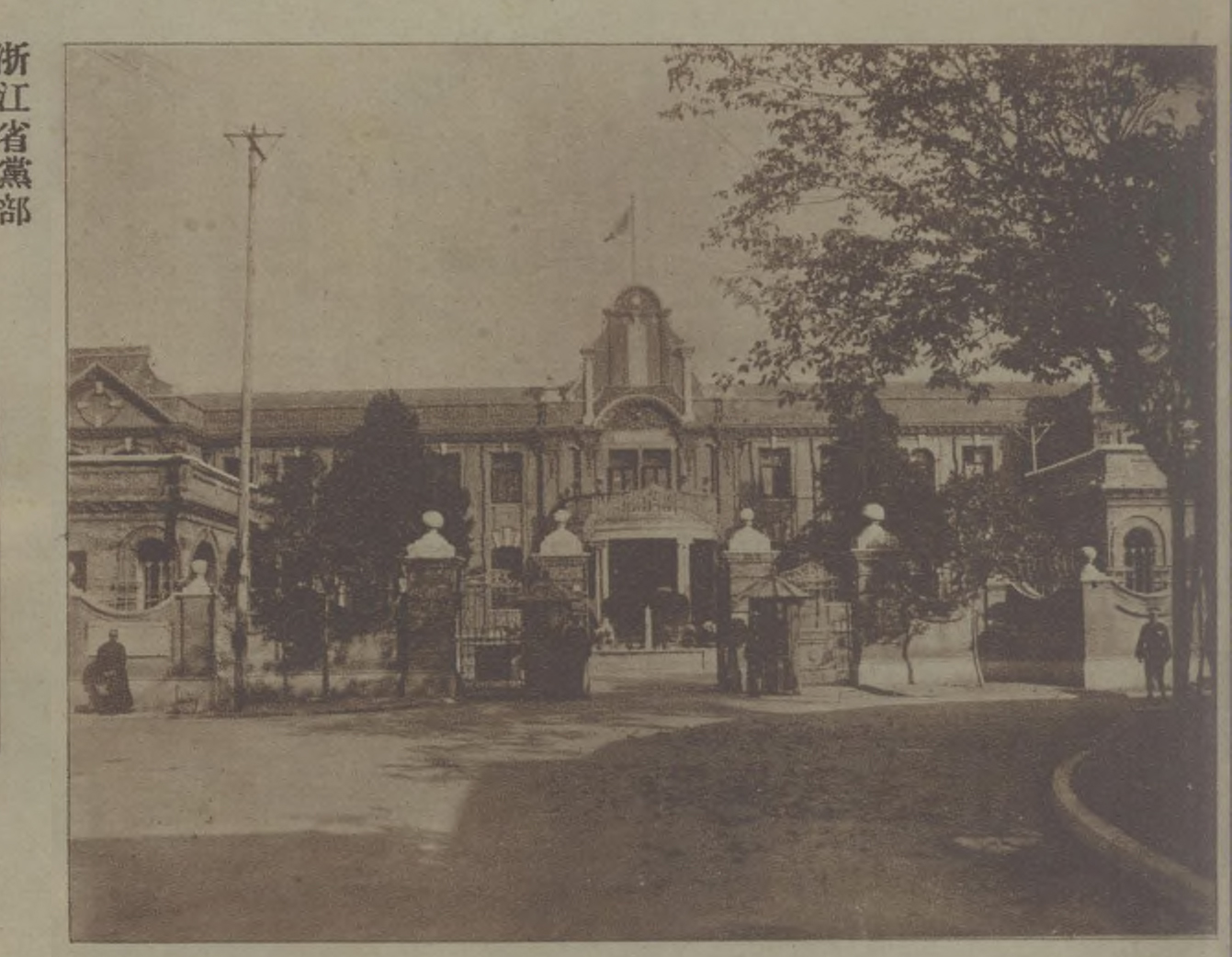
Chinese Nationalist Party Zhejiang Branch

The guiding agency described by the Southeast Daily

In the 1930s, the Southeast Daily proposed the editorial policy of "Party stance, liberal color". Compared with the Central Daily News, it diluted the party color and had more flexible content and tone. In the early days of the name change, the Southeast Daily tried to get rid of the identity of the Kuomintang party newspaper, publicly stating that the Southeast Daily was founded by some Kuomintang members who were interested in cultural undertakings and loyal to the news industry, emphasizing its identity as a private newspaper. However, in fact, its essence as a Kuomintang newspaper has not changed. Hu Jianzhong himself admitted that the Southeast Daily is "100% party newspaper". The company's leadership is composed of important members of the Kuomintang, including Chairman Chen Guofu, Supervisor Chen Lifu, Executive Director Xu Shaodi and Hu Jianzhong. Most of the other directors and supervisors are also members of the Kuomintang Central Committee or Zhejiang Provincial Party Committee. Hu Jianzhong and Liu Xiangnv continued to serve as the president and editor-in-chief of the Southeast Daily respectively, and He Huairen served as the manager. This move is intended to dilute the bureaucratic party color of the newspaper and shape it into a private newspaper on the surface to attract a wider readership and collect public opinion.

=== Authors ===
The group of scholars who contributed to the newspaper included well-known figures such as Hu Daojing, Chen Youqin, Chen Daci, Yuan Weizi, Wang Jisi, Zhong Jingwen, Qian Nanyang, Zhang Qiyun, Qi Sihe, etc. Famous journalists such as Hu Qiuyuan, Cao Juren, Xu Junwu, Qian Gufeng, Zhao Haosheng, Cha Liangyong, and Zhong Peizhang were also among them. The group of translators consisted of Xu Weinan, Yang Zhenhua, Dong Dingshan, Dong Leshan, Sun Yong, Cai Zhenyang, Huang Hongsen, Ren Mingyao, etc. In addition, writers such as Zhang Tingqian, Gao Yang, Xu Jinfu, Yao Sufeng, Jiang Wenjie, Xie Yu, Shen Dafu, and Zhu Fusheng were also part of the group. CCP members such as Tang Gongxian, Xuan Zhonghua, Yang Xianjiang, Dai Bangding, and Feng Xuefeng were also included.

In 1936, the Hangzhou Journalists Association moved to and was built next to the Southeast Daily News Building at Zhong'an Bridge.

=== Supplement ===
The Southeast Daily had a wide variety of supplements. In 1934, it included daily publications such as Shafa and Wuyue Chunqiu, as well as the biweekly Jinshi Shuhua. In terms of weekly publications, there were seven: Public Health, Children of Today, Voice of Reading, Education Garden, Scientific Knowledge, Screen Scenery, and Modern Economy. Subsequently, the newspaper also added supplements such as Southeast Pictorial, Xiaozhu, Fayan, Xueyuan, Reading Garden, Popular Forum, Entertainment, Changchun, Literature and History, International Knowledge, Metropolis, and Sports Edition. After the newspaper moved to Jinhua, Shafa was renamed Pen Lei, and a Saturday Weekend Edition was added.

Among them, the supplements of Southeast Daily, Bi Lei, and Da Gong Yuan, the supplements of Ta Kung Pao, were praised by writer Qin Mu as "East-West Twin Stars". Bi Lei was edited by Zhang Huijian and Chen Xiangping, and attracted regular contributions from Feng Yuxiang, Wang Zaoshi, Wang Xiyan, Jin Yi, Yang Chao, Chen Bochui, Xie Yue, Yuan Weizi, Weng Xinhui, Cao Juren and others. Bi Lei also mobilized and publicized the masses through special issues. For example, on May 4 and 5, 1939, Bi Lei launched two consecutive issues of the "May 4th Youth Day Special Issue", which published articles such as "The Chinese Youth Inspirational Association's Letter to Youths to Celebrate the May 4th Youth Day", "Youth Day and the Scientific Spirit", "Congratulations on Youth Day", "What Youths Should Know about Commemorating the May 4th Youth Day", and "Understanding of May 4th", calling on young people to inherit the May 4th spirit. In addition, Bi Lei also exposed Japan's war crimes and introduced Japan's anti-war sentiment through essays, poems, reportage and other forms.

== See also ==
- Hangzhou Journalists Association
- List of daily newspapers in the Republic of China
