= Ta Kung Pao (1902–1949) =

Historical editions of Ta Kung Pao, the longest running newspaper in China

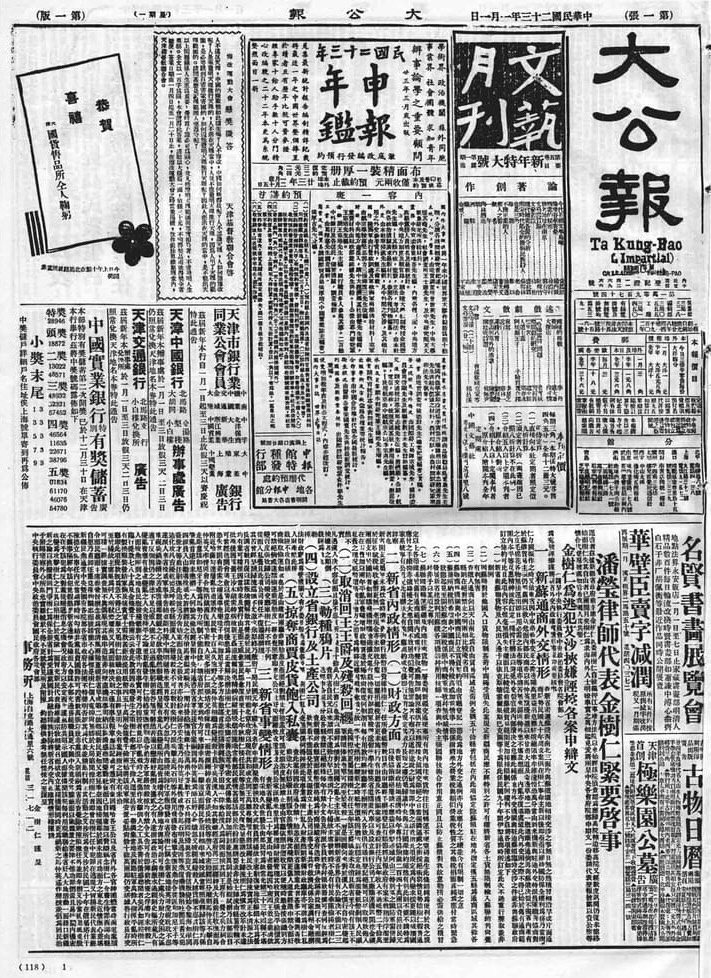
- Ta Kung Pao, 1 January 1934
- Type: Daily newspaper
- Format: Broadsheet
- Founded: June 17, 1902; 123 years ago
- Political alignment: Liberalism
- Language: Traditional Chinese
- Headquarters: Tianjin→Shanghai
- Circulation: Over 200,000 per day (as of 1948)

Ta Kung Pao (simplified Chinese: 大公报; traditional Chinese: 大公報; French: L'Impartial) was one of the most influential newspapers of the Republic of China until 1949.

Established in 1902 by Ying Lianzhi, a Manchu aristocrat, within the French Concession of Tianjin, Ta Kung Pao initially championed the cause of a constitutional monarchy in China. However, following the 1911 Xinhai Revolution, Ying withdrew from active involvement in the newspaper's operations. In 1916, with backing from the Anfu Club, shareholder Wang Zhilong took over full ownership, transforming Ta Kung Pao into the club's mouthpiece. Wang appointed Hu Zhengzhi as both chief editor and manager, leading to significant reforms in both the newspaper's design and its editorial approach. The decline of the Anfu Club by 1920 prompted Wang to divest his stake, and Hu's subsequent resignation saw a drastic reduction in circulation, culminating in the newspaper's shutdown on November 27, 1925.

In 1926, Wu Dingchang, Zhang Jiluan, and Hu Zhengzhi formed the Xinji Company and took over Ta Kung Pao. Known for its principles of four no's, namely non-partisan, not for sale, no self-interest, and not blind, Ta Kung Pao became famous for its sharp political commentary and current affairs reporting. From its inception in 1902 until the Ta Kung Pao Revival Declaration published in Shanghai in 1949, it was referred to as the "old Ta Kung Pao". After 1949, it gradually came under the control of the Chinese Communist Party, with the Chongqing edition becoming the Chongqing Daily, and the Tianjin and Shanghai editions merging and relocating to Beijing, ceasing publication in 1966, leaving only the Hong Kong edition still in existence today.

Ta Kung Pao was the only Chinese newspaper to send reporters to the Paris Peace Conference after World War I and the only one to station reporters in Europe during World War II. It sent journalists to witness historical events such as the Potsdam Conference and the Japanese surrender ceremony aboard the USS Missouri. Additionally, it was the first Chinese newspaper to be listed on the stock market. Along with Yishi Bao, Shen Bao, and Minguo Daily, Ta Kung Pao was one of the "Four Major Newspapers of the Republic of China".

== Early history ==
=== Establishment ===
In April 1901, Ying Lianzhi arrived in Tianjin, then under the control of the Eight-Nation Alliance, to visit Chai Tiancong, the overseer of the Catholic Church in the Zizhulin area. During his visit, Chai proposed the idea of starting a newspaper, mentioning that he had already secured funding of over ten thousand yuan and invited Ying to take charge, assuring him that he need not worry about profit and loss. Consequently, Ying consulted He Wosheng and Hu Yinan, drafted the newspaper's charter, and began activities to raise further capital and attract shareholders. By August, the Tianjin Donghua Translation Office was willing to collaborate, and the French Church and its embassy expressed their interest in participating in the newspaper project and agreed to its establishment in Tianjin.

Following the Eight-Nation Alliance's occupation of Beijing and Tianjin, the French consulate sought to develop a media tool to counterbalance the influence of other foreign powers, competing with Zhi Bao, founded by Constantin von Hanneken, the Peking and Tientsin Times supported by the Tianjin British Concession's Works Department, and the Tianjin Daily News backed by the Japanese Consulate in Tianjin. The occupation led to anti-foreign and anti-Christian movements in regions like Guangzong and Julu in Zhili province, and the Tianjin Catholic Church urgently needed a publication to help ease the tensions between the locals and the church.

In October 1901, Ying traveled to Shanghai with Frédéric-Vincent Lebbe of the Missionary Society to purchase printing equipment and started looking for a chief editor in Hong Kong and Shanghai. He met with Ma Xiangbo in Shanghai, who suggested Zhang Jusheng could recommend a chief editor, though this did not materialize. Wang Rongqing volunteered to join the newspaper but opposed the idea of French capital investment in the newspaper. Thus, settling for the next best option, Fang Shouliu was hired as the chief editor, and Mu Yuanfu as the translator.

=== Ta Kung Pao under Ying Lianzhi ===
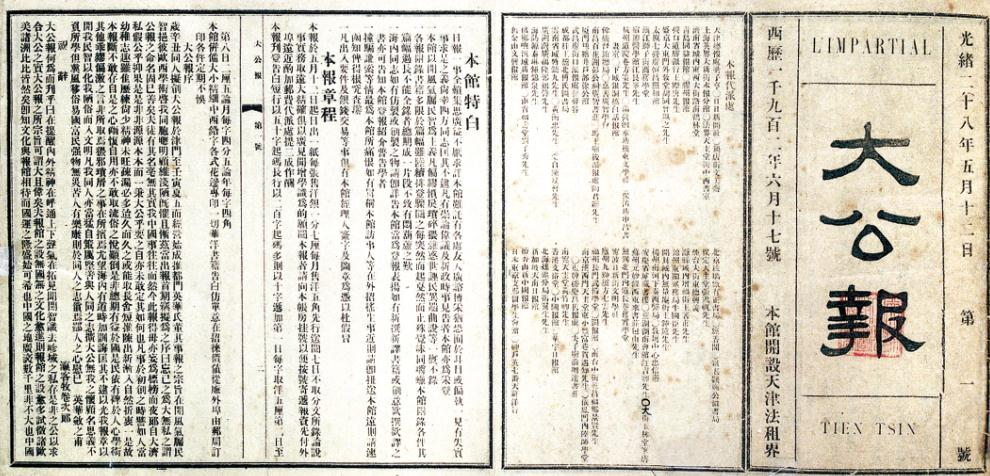
The first issue of Ta Kung Pao, 17 June 1902

On 17 June 1902, Ta Kung Pao was first published in the French Concession of Tianjin. The initial chief editor, Fang Shouliu, was relatively inexperienced, and Ying Lianzhi himself effectively served as the chief editor, with most unsigned articles written by him. The newspaper's staff were not allowed to receive payment for work outside the newspaper or to propagate for any political party. The supplement was written in the local languages of Beijing and Tianjin, rather than classic Chinese. Initially, the daily circulation was 3,800 copies. Besides Chai Tiancong, the shareholders included grain and timber merchant Wang Zhilong, German merchant Ronghua Yanghang's Zhang Lianbi, reformist Yan Fu, Beijing Bishop Fan Guoliang, and Bao Wo from the French consulate in China, with most other shareholders being Catholics.

Ta Kung Pao frequently exposed the Tianjin authorities' maladministration, leading to dissatisfaction from the Tianjin authorities but was protected by the French consul. On November 17, 1902, Ta Kung Pao published a letter criticizing the Tianjin Health Bureau for incompetence after the Allied Command was disbanded, leading to negotiations between the Tianjin authorities and the French consul, who were informed by Li Jingyu, the senior translator of the French Consulate. In early 1903, due to the newspaper's content, the Tianjin authorities negotiated with the French consulate, requesting a warning to Ta Kung Pao. Ying sought help from the Frenchman Mergan, and the situation was eventually defused through the intervention of the French consul. By the end of the same year, Ying was again informed that the government intended to trouble Ta Kung Pao, advising extra caution.

However, because Ta Kung Pao did not show an overtly pro-French stance, the French consulate attempted to control the newspaper by proposing a French person as the public face, which Ying rejected. In April 1903, Russia's refusal to withdraw troops from the Eastern Three Provinces sparked the anti-Russian movement. Ta Kung Pao published several editorials condemning Russian aggression and calling for national resistance, leading to a reprimand from the Russian governor but continued anti-Russian publications, displeasing the French consul. In May and July–August 1903, Ta Kung Pao extensively reprinted anti-Russian editorials from Japanese newspapers, attracting the attention of Japanese consulate staff. Consequently, in July 1903, Ying exchanged gifts and dined with the Japanese Consul Takao Koyou. After the Shen Jin case, Ying personally visited the Japanese consulate to inquire about the details and had fewer exchanges with the French.

The paper's 1902 criticism of the foreign forces of the Eight-Nation Alliance (which had established posts in Tianjin following the Boxer War) resulted in French authorities issuing fines against the paper; Ying moved its operations from the French concession to the Japanese concession.

During the Russo-Japanese War, Ta Kung Pao actively reported on the war by frequently reprinting articles from Japanese media like Asahi Shimbun and North China Herald, dedicating sections like "Current Affairs News" to "Japanese Official Telegraphs". The newspaper also published editorials analyzing the impact of the Russo-Japanese War on China, emphasizing the need for China to catch up and reform to preserve the nation. The "Prospering Asia" theory within Japan and signals of a "Sino-Japanese Alliance to Protect East Asia" released by the Japanese consulate led Ta Kung Pao, under Ying's leadership, to advocate for a Sino-Japanese alliance as a strategy for national preservation. Ying's pro-Japanese stance eventually made it intolerable for the French consulate, forcing Ta Kung Pao to move from the French Concession to the Japanese Concession. After moving to the Japanese Concession in 1906, Ying's interactions with the Japanese consulate decreased, and the newspaper no longer showed a clear pro-Japanese bias. However, during this period, Ta Kung Pao had developed into a major commercial newspaper in the north.

After the Xinhai Revolution, Ying's advocacy for constitutional monarchy failed. In 1912, the Republic of China banned Ta Kung Pao after it criticised Yuan Shikai. Ying responded by distributing the paper free of charge. Ying, unwilling to cooperate with Yuan, left Ta Kung Pao and retired to Jingyi Garden in Fragrant Hills, Beijing. In 1917, a flood in North China affected over six million people, and Ying staged a fundraising event at Ta Kung Pao's sponsored carnival but ceased further contact with Ta Kung Pao.

=== Ta Kung Pao under Wang Zhilong ===
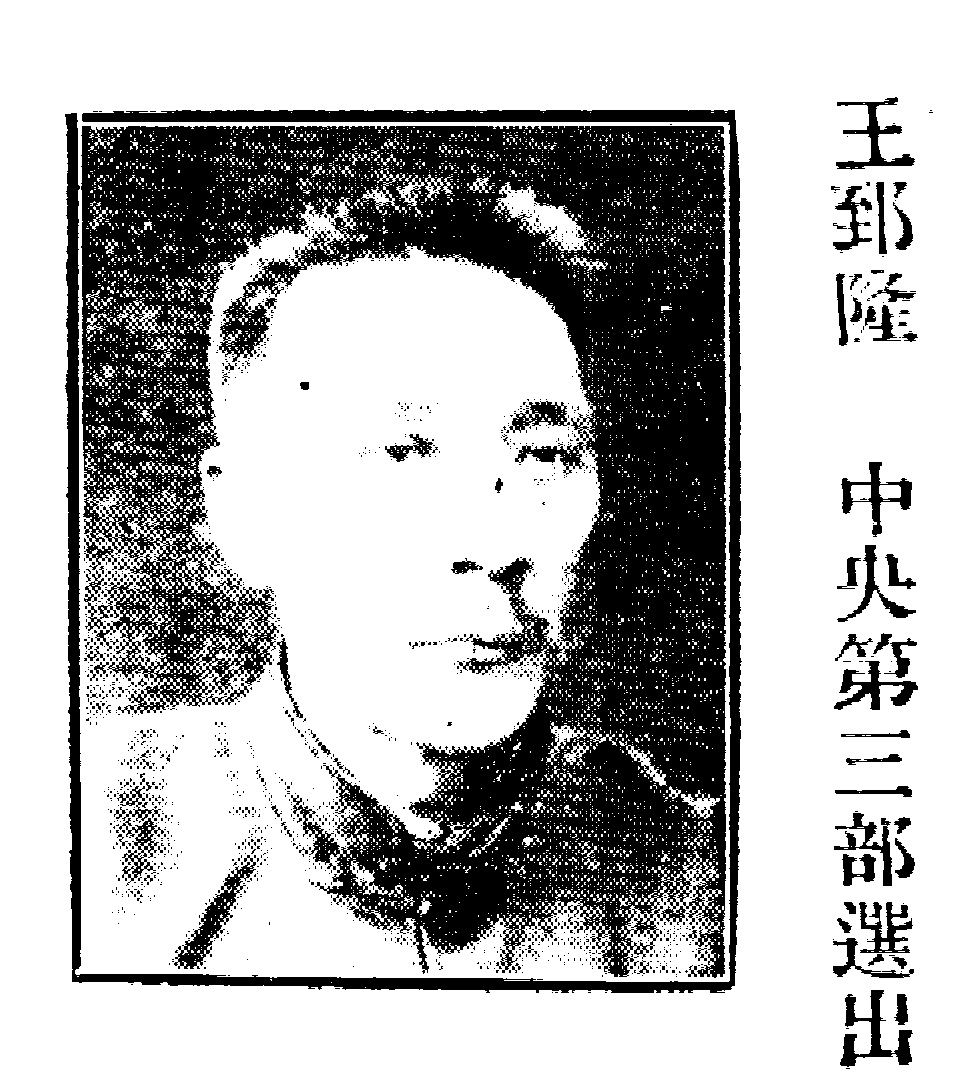
Wang Zhilong

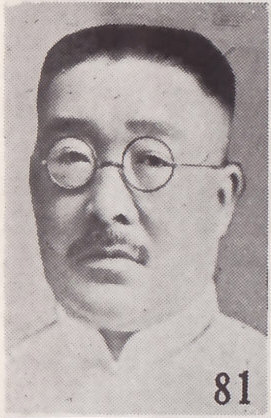
Hu Zhengzhi

In September 1916, with the support of the Anfu Club, original shareholder Wang Zhilong acquired all shares of Ta Kung Pao, turning it into the organ of the Anfu Club. In October 1916, Wang hired Hu Zhengzhi as the chief editor and manager. To eliminate fabricated news, Hu immediately fired five out of six reporters at the newspaper, retaining only the one whose father was an official at the Presidential Palace. Later, in Beijing, he hired Lin Baishui, Liang Hongzhi, Wang E'sun, and others as contributing reporters, who sent their articles via telephone and mail.

In November 1916, Hu reformed the print layout from booklet style to column style, adjusted font sizes, and arranged for different font sizes and spacings to create an aesthetically pleasing layout. He personally visited the typesetting room every night to oversee the layout. Simultaneously, he began publishing economic information such as "Today's Silver Yuan Market" and "Stock Markets Around the Country". In January 1917, he reformed the newspaper's content, assigning special commissioners to attend Beijing's political meetings and arranging informants in major provinces to report significant news at any time. While other newspapers focused on military, political, and sensational social news, Ta Kung Pao added a "Special Records" section to collect opinions from celebrities and created columns for education and industry.

In May 1919, Ta Kung Pao extensively reported on the May Fourth Movement in Beijing and Qingdao. As the only Chinese reporter at the Paris Peace Conference, Hu Zhengzhi, along with Xie Dongfa, released press statements in French to major news agencies on behalf of the Chinese press, explaining China's reasons for refusing to sign the treaty.

After the Zhili-Anhui War in 1920, the Anfu Club was defeated, and Wang Zhilong fled to Japan. On August 12, he announced his withdrawal from Ta Kung Pao's shares. The same day, Hu Zhengzhi announced his resignation as chief editor and manager of Ta Kung Pao. The next day, Ta Kung Pao ceased publication, and its reputation plummeted. Wang Zhilong died on September 27, 1923, due to the Great Kanto Earthquake. On November 27, 1925, Ta Kung Pao ceased publication after issue number 8315.

== Re-establishment and later history ==
=== Re-establishment ===
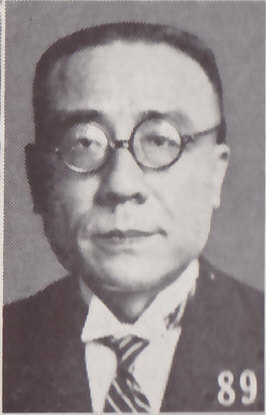
Wu Dingchang

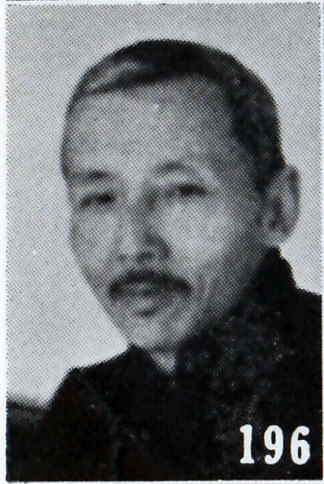
Zhang Jiluan

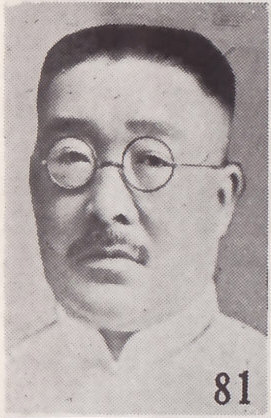
Hu Zhengzhi

Wu Dingchang, Zhang Jiluan, and Hu Zhengzhi were old friends from their student days abroad. In 1924, Wu Dingchang proposed to Zhang Jiluan and Hu Zhengzhi the idea of jointly running a news organization, which would include a daily newspaper, a weekly magazine, and a news agency. However, due to the closure of the "Zhonghua Xin Bao" where Zhang Jiluan was working, and the difficulties encountered by the Guowen News Agency and "Guowen Weekly" under Hu Zhengzhi's leadership, this plan was not immediately implemented. During this period, Wu Dingchang supported "Guowen Weekly" financially and published economic commentaries in the magazine. In 1926, following the loss of his position due to the Central Plains War and finding himself in seclusion in Tianjin, Zhang Jiluan, along with the decline of the Zhili and Anhui cliques, Wu Dingchang thought of gaining political support through running a newspaper, an idea that received backing from the Northern Four Banks.

In 1926, Wu Dingchang, Zhang Jiluan, and Hu Zhengzhi formed the Xinji Company to take over Ta Kung Pao. There are two versions regarding the reasons behind their decision to relaunch Ta Kung Pao. One version is that Zhang Jiluan and Hu Zhengzhi, often passing by the desolate scene of the Ta Kung Pao office in Tianjin, were moved to restart the newspaper and sought Wu Dingchang to co-finance the venture. Another version is that during a visit to Wu Dingchang, the three stumbled upon the Ta Kung Pao office on the street and, after discussion, decided to jointly finance the revival of Ta Kung Pao. Ultimately, they unanimously decided to purchase the assets and brand of Ta Kung Pao. The initial funding of fifty thousand yuan for the Ta Kung Pao was arranged by Wu Dingchang through the Four Banks Savings Association from an "Economic Research Fund", making both Wu Dingchang and the Northern Four Banks listed as shareholders. Although the Northern Four Banks and their key figures supported Wu Dingchang in raising the start-up capital for the Ta Kung Pao, they only served as nominal shareholders and did not partake in the actual management of the newspaper.

=== Revival ===
On September 1, 1926, Ta Kung Pao continued its publication with issue number 8316. Initially, daily sales did not exceed 2,000 copies, with a monthly loss of three to four thousand yuan. As the Northern Expedition progressed, sales increased to 5,800 copies, gradually reducing losses until breaking even in May. By the end of the year, circulation reached 12,000 copies. By 1929, the newspaper's circulation had grown to over 20,000 copies, with advertising revenue reaching more than 6,000 yuan per month. In March of the same year, a new office was established in Nanjing, further expanding the newspaper's influence. In 1930, circulation peaked at 30,000 copies, with 293 distribution points nationwide and monthly advertising revenue of 8 to 9 thousand yuan.

In February 1931, the newspaper introduced a high-speed rotary printing press made in Germany and adopted double-sided printing technology, boosting circulation to 50,000 copies and advertising revenue to over 10,000 yuan per month. In May, to celebrate the publication of its 10,000th issue, Ta Kung Pao issued three large supplemental sections comprising six broadsheets and 24 pages in total. On May 22, circulation surged to over 50,000 copies, coinciding with Wu Dingchang's 48th birthday, for which a commemorative dinner was held at the National Hotel.

=== Tianjin Incident ===
Following the Mukden Incident, Wu Dingchang, Hu Zhengzhi, and Zhang Jiluan anticipated potential issues due to the newspaper's location in the Japanese Concession and immediately sought a new site. They found an old textile factory behind the Electric Light Plant in the French Concession for renovation. On November 8, the Tianjin Incident erupted, with paramilitary groups organized by Zhang Bi and Li Jichun harassing and causing disturbances in Tianjin's Chinese district. Japanese troops subsequently deployed, aiming to take over the city. Ta Kung Pao's location on Xu Street became a patrolled zone by Japanese forces, surrounded by sandbags and wire fences, with Hu Zhengzhi, Zhang Jiluan, and all reporters and workers staying within the newspaper office. Zhang Jiluan hoped to downplay the incident, thus on November 9, the news of the Tianjin Incident was placed only on the local news page without mentioning the actions of the Japanese forces. Following reports of a civilian being shot in front of the Daibei Hotel, Hu Zhengzhi and Zhang Jiluan decided to evacuate the newspaper office, securing safe passage after contacting the Japanese consulate. Unable to take any machinery, lead type, copper plates, or paper, operations at Xu Street were forced to cease. Hu Zhengzhi, Zhang Jiluan, and Wu Dingchang later met at Wu's residence, deciding to continue publishing the newspaper amid external threats rather than temporarily halting publication, and organised a move.

On November 16, 1931, the Ta Kung Pao was reissued from its new location at 161, 30th Road in the French Concession. Initially, due to the rotary press not being fully installed, the newspaper had to temporarily resort to flatbed printing, significantly slowing down the publication process and temporarily reducing the newspaper's length to one broadsheet of four pages. By February 11, 1932, the new machinery was fully assembled, and normal operations resumed with a simple celebration. The new premises in the French Concession were more spacious than the old ones in the Japanese Concession, featuring a manager's department, a materials warehouse, a typesetting room, and a printing room. In February 1933, the newspaper acquired a new German-made rotary press, and staff numbers increased to over 300. On New Year's Day 1934, Ta Kung Pao introduced "Weekly Essays," inviting external experts to write, and gradually shifted its editorials to vernacular Chinese, enhancing the newspaper's influence and reader base.

=== Second Sino-Japanese war ===
==== Closure in Tianjin ====
Following the Marco Polo Bridge Incident in 1937, Japanese forces launched an assault on Tianjin on the 28th of July. Due to severed external transportation, the Tianjin edition of Ta Kung Pao was restricted to distribution solely within the city limits. By the 1st of August, Tianjin had succumbed to Japanese control, leading to Ta Kung Pao announcing a temporary halt to its publication by the 4th of August. In the declaration of its temporary suspension, Ta Kung Pao clearly stated its commitment to aligning its fate with that of the legitimate administration of the Republic of China in Tianjin, staunchly refusing to yield to the pressures of any illegitimate authority.

==== Retreat to Shanghai and Wuhan ====
By the end of 1936, in response to the escalating Japanese aggression in North China, Ta Kung Pao established its Shanghai edition. On 1 April 1936, Ta Kung Pao set up its operations on Wangping Street in Shanghai, launching the Shanghai edition. The Tianjin and Shanghai editions were published simultaneously.

The Japanese invasion of Shanghai occurred on 13 August 1937. On 14 August, Hu Zhengzhi directed the staff of Ta Kung Pao's Nanjing office and the Tianjin edition to rush to Wuhan to prepare for the Hankou edition. The Tianjin staff relocated to Shanghai and Wuhan. The Hankou edition of Ta Kung Pao was launched on 18 September 1937. Following the fall of Nanjing on 13 December, the Japanese forces demand news censorship for all newspapers within the International Settlement in Shanghai. Ta Kung Pao refused to be inspected by the Japanese authorities and announce a cessation of publication from 15 December, with the staff retreated to Wuhan. In mid-1938, as the Battle of Wuhan commenced, Chiang Kai-shek ordered the evacuation of Wuhan, leading to the suspension of the Hankou edition on 18 October 1938.

==== Retreat to Hong Kong and Guilin ====
At the end of 1937, Hu Zhengzhi decided to establish Ta Kung Pao in Hong Kong, launching the Hong Kong edition on the anniversary of the Japanese invasion of Shanghai. Hu stated in the inaugural issue that Ta Kung Pao would continue serving the nation. Due to its esteemed reputation, the Hong Kong edition faced hostility from local competitors on its first day of circulation, including disturbances by hired children who snatched and tore up the newspapers. The focus on commercial news by the local press, not political commentary, resulted in poor sales for Ta Kung Pao; coupled with the low cost of local advertising, this led to operational losses for Ta Kung Pao until exclusive coverage of the Wang-Japan Secret Agreement in January 1940 significantly increased circulation.

Early in 1940, foreseeing the Japanese invasion of Hong Kong, Hu sought land in Guilin for construction and gradually moved several flatbed printing presses and other necessary equipment there, establishing the Guilin edition on March 15, 1941, as a backup for the Hong Kong edition. After the Japanese occupied Hong Kong in December 1941, the Hong Kong Ta Kung Pao staff evacuated to the Guilin office. On September 12, 1944, due to Japanese bombing, the Guilin Ta Kung Pao ceased publication, and the editorial staff once again retreated to Chongqing, losing all office supplies and equipment in the evacuation. Chongqing then became the central voice and final haven for Ta Kung Pao until Japan's surrender in August 1945.

==== Chongqing ====
On the Chinese New Year's Eve of 1938, Cao Gubing went to Chongqing to prepare a new office. The move of the Hankou edition to Chongqing saw significant losses due to insufficient transportation, leaving behind office supplies and suffering from Japanese aerial bombings near Yichang. On December 1, 1938, Zhang Jiluan established the Chongqing office on Xinfeng Street. On May 3, 1939, the Chongqing office was bombed in an air strike, and on May 4, the already ruined office was bombed again. Due to continuous Japanese bombings, the newspaper had to be rebuilt, with Hu Zhengzhi personally overseeing the reconstruction at a new site in Liziba, including carving out air-raid shelters to ensure uninterrupted publication. On 30 August and 15 September 1939, the new manager's office, office building, and a printing workshop in Liziba were bombed. On 10 July, the Liziba manager's building was directly hit and burned down; following heavy rain, all staff were left to shelter in the rain for two nights. On 30 July, the printing plant was bombed, destroying the printing presses. Despite continuous Japanese bombings, Ta Kung Pao never ceased publication, maintaining a leading circulation among Chongqing newspapers.

In 1941, Ta Kung Pao received the Missouri Honor Medal for Journalism, but soon after faced the death of editor-in-chief Zhang Jiluan. Hu Zhengzhi immediately contacted Wu Dingchang, deciding to establish a joint board of directors to collectively lead the newspapers in Chongqing, Hong Kong, and Guilin. On September 6, 1943, Hu announced the "Ta Kung Pao Colleagues Convention," setting September 1 as the anniversary to commemorate the founding by Wu Dingchang, Zhang Jiluan, and Hu Zhengzhi.

=== Chinese Communist Revolution ===
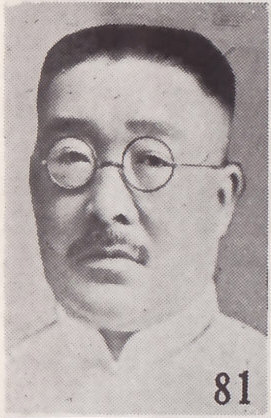
胡政之

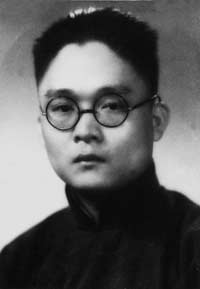
王芸生

After the Second Sino-Japanese War, Ta Kung Pao began the work of resuming publication of its various editions. On November 1 and December 1, 1945, the Shanghai and Tianjin editions were successively resumed. On New Year's Day 1946, Ta Kung Pao's General Administration Office was established in Shanghai, overseen by General Manager Hu Zhengzhi, who coordinated operations across all branches.

In 1948, Ta Kung Pao published a series of editorials, advocating for a liberal "middle way," between Kuomintang and Communists, which were at war with each other and came under attack from both sides.

Foreseeing the conflicts between the United States and the Soviet Union, Hu Zhengzhi believed that Ta Kung Pao could not survive no matter whether it was under Communist or Kuomintang rule. Therefore, he set up an English version of Ta Kung Pao in New York and re-established the Hong Kong edition in 1948 and planned for future relocations to Singapore or the United States, with Hong Kong serving as a fallback. He believed that only in Hong Kong could Ta Kung Pao survive in the long run. Upon the publication of Hong Kong edition, the daily sales of Ta Kung Pao reached its peak at over 200,000 copies in four cities, including Tianjin, Shanghai, Chongqing and Hong Kong.

After falling ill in Hong Kong, Hu Zhengzhi died in Shanghai in April 1949, leaving the future of Ta Kung Pao in the hands of Wang Yunwu. Facing severe criticism from the Kuomintang, Wang shifted the newspaper's allegiance towards the Communist camp. This transition marked a significant change in the direction and editorial stance of Ta Kung Pao.

== Evolution of viewpoints ==
=== Ying Lianzhi ===
During the period under Ying Lianzhi's leadership, editorials in Ta Kung Pao, numbering over 20 per month, frequently critiqued figures such as Empress Dowager Cixi, Ronglu, and Gang Yi. Despite its bold criticisms, the newspaper did not forget to support the imperial cause, advocating for a constitutional monarchy. In 1905, Ta Kung Pao responded to the movement against the mistreatment of Chinese workers in the United States by refusing to publish advertisements from American businesses and encouraging a boycott of American goods. Yuan Shikai, the Governor-General of Zhili, banned the mailing and reading of Ta Kung Pao, citing it as harmful to diplomatic relations and peace. On August 17, Ying Lianzhi wrote that constitutional reform needed the removal of the wicked and the promotion of the virtuous, indirectly referencing Yuan Shikai. In February 1907, Ta Kung Pao raised 11,469 taels for relief of the Jiangnan flood disaster. In 1908, following the deaths of Emperor Guangxu and Empress Dowager Cixi, with Prince Regent Zaifeng assuming power and proposals for Yuan Shikai's reappointment emerging as he returned to his ancestral home in Xiangcheng, Henan, Ta Kung Pao vehemently opposed the suggestion to reappoint Yuan Shikai.

=== Zhang Jillian and Hu Zhengzhi ===
After Wang Zhilong took over the newspaper in 1916, Hu Zhengzhi joined the team following discussions with Ying Lianzhi. Wang Zhilong did not interfere with the newspaper's operations, ensuring that Ta Kung Pao did not become biased due to its connection with the Anfu Club. In November 1916, the paper continuously tracked and reported on the Laoxikai Incident, condemning the unreasonable demands of the French Concession and criticising the Francet's inappropriate measures. In February 1917, the paper focused on the severance of diplomatic relations between the United States and Germany, interviewing nationals from the UK, Germany, and other relevant countries in China to understand the Republic of China's foreign policy options. In July 1917, Ta Kung Pao closely followed the restoration attempt by Zhang Xun, significantly increasing its circulation with sales exceeding 10,000 copies. In 1918, Hu Zhengzhi personally visited Vladivostok, paying close attention to the Chinese Eastern Railway issue and the Siberian Expedition.

Zhang Jiluan, who joined in 1926, adhered to the Chinese tradition of scholar-official by vehemently criticising political leaders in three editorials to advocate for the establishment of a democratic republic system. On December 4, 1926, Ta Kung Pao published an editorial titled "The Fall of a Tyrant," criticising Wu Peifu as "strong yet ignorant, now devoid of even strength, possessing only arrogance." On November 4, 1927, Ta Kung Pao released an editorial, "Alas! The Sin of a Leader's Ambition," which condemned Wang Jingwei for prioritising personal ambition over national interest, local governance, and the lives and property of the people, thereby sacrificing these for his inconsistent and uncertain leadership desires. On December 2, 1927, Ta Kung Pao published an editorial, "Chiang Kai-shek's View on Life," targeting Chiang Kai-shek's belief, following his marriage to Soong Mei-ling, that "life is meaningless without a happy marriage," and his conviction that "the revolutionary work will definitely progress after getting married today." The editorial criticised his viewpoint and questioned whether Chiang could seek happy marriages for all members of the Kuomintang and the army to promote the progress of the revolution.

==== Advocating Chiang Kai-shek ====
In June 1928, Hu Zhengzhi went to Beijing to interview Yang Yuting, being the first to report on Zhang Zuolin's retreat from the pass and continuously followed up on the assassination of Zhang Zuolin and the National Government's control over the Beijing-Tianjin area. He interviewed Yan Xishan and Bai Chongxi and praised Chiang Kai-shek for resigning from his military post, believing it would contribute to the establishment of civil governance. In July, to report on Chiang Kai-shek and Li Zongren's journey northward, Zhang Jiluan visited his old friend Feng Yuxiang. Through Feng's introduction, he met Chiang Kai-shek and then travelled to Beijing on his special train, where he had enjoyable conversations with personalities such as Shao Lizi, Zhang Qun, and Chen Bulei. After Chiang Kai-shek, Feng Yuxiang, Yan Xishan, and Li Zongren held a memorial ceremony for Sun Yat-sen at Biyun Temple in the Western Hills, Zhang Jiluan took a car provided by the Minister of Transportation, Zhang Bojun, to Kaifeng and then took Feng Yuxiang's special train to Nanjing. During the Second Plenary Session of the Fifth Central Committee of the Kuomintang, he interviewed key figures of the National Government, thereby establishing Ta Kung Pao's stance in support of the National Government.

In 1930, Ta Kung Pao was the first press to report the intervention of Zhang Xueliang in the Central Plains War, which led to the defeats of Yan Xishan and Bai Chongxi. After the Mukden Incident of 1931, Ta Kung Pao did not approve for escalation of the war with Japan but rather discussed on how to revenge in the future, aligning itself with Chiang Kai-shek and was therefore criticised by overseas Chinese in Southeast Asia. In the Xi'an Incident of 1936, Chiang Kai-shek was detained by Zhang Xueliang and Yang Hucheng, an event that occurred simultaneously with Ta Kung Pao's publication of Chiang's order to dismiss Zhang. The Nationalist government air-dropped tens of thousands of copies of Ta Kung Pao over Xi'an, each bearing an open letter demanding Zhang to release Chiang. In the New Fourth Army incident of 1941, Ta Kung Pao sided with the Nationalist government, criticising the Communist Party for its attack on allied forces. After the Battle of South Shanxi, Ta Kung Pao advocated for cooperation between the Communist Party and the Nationalist government, attributing the failure to the Communists' reluctance to collaborate, prompting Zhou Enlai to pen a letter rebutting the accusations.

=== Wang Yunsheng ===
Wang Yunsheng did not share a deep friendship with Chiang Kai-shek, like Zhang Jiluan. Following Zhang's death, as the war entered its later stages with defeats, soaring prices, and widespread suffering among the populace, Wang gradually intensified his criticism of the government. After the fall of Hong Kong, Wang requested Chen Bulei to rescue Hu Zhengzhi, who was still in Hong Kong. On December 9, he had people wait at Chongqing's Shanhuba Airport for Hu, but the last plane brought not Hu but Song Ailing, Kong Lingwei, an old maid, numerous trunks and crates, and several foreign dogs, infuriating Wang. On December 22, 1941, Wang revealed the scandal of evacuation planes from Hong Kong carrying trunks, maids, and foreign dogs instead of refugees, and exposing the Foreign Minister Guo Taiqi for purchasing a private mansion with a substantial amount of public funds amidst national crisis. This publication led to Chiang Kai-shek dismissing Guo Taiqi that very day. The scandal involving Miss Kong sparked student protests against Kong Xiangxi in cities like Kunming and Zunyi.By 1944, the Chongqing edition of Ta Kung Pao began to harshly criticise the policies and actions of the Nationalist government. On December 3, on the eve of the Japanese occupation of Dushan, it published an editorial criticising the strategy of "trading space for time," calling for a thorough political overhaul. This included the removal of ineffective officials, welcoming non-party individuals to participate in governance, addressing party issues, and enhancing cooperation with the Allies. It also urged Chiang Kai-shek to personally supervise the war effort in Guiyang.

In November 1945, Ta Kung Pao covered a manifesto by intellectuals calling for an end to press censorship and the restoration of freedom of expression. This stance against government control over the media was further emphasized in 1948 when the newspaper responded to the shutdown of another publication by highlighting the protests of notable figures from the journalism, cultural, and legal sectors. Throughout the late 1940s, Ta Kung Pao consistently reported on and critiqued human rights violations and abuses of power, demonstrating its commitment to journalistic integrity and the public's right to know. Notably, the paper's staff faced direct repercussions for their work, including assaults and arrests in 1946 and 1947, indicating the risks they took to report the truth.

==== Middle way ====
Ta Kung Pao consistently refrained from using derogatory terms like "Communist bandits" or "bandit troops" on its pages, opting instead for "Communist Party" and "Communist army," indicating its recognition of the Communist Party as a legitimate opposition to the Nationalist Party, rather than mere "bandits." However, the newspaper also critiqued the Communist Party and faced criticism from both sides. On October 25, 1945, Wang Yunsheng published an editorial criticising the Communist Party for transportation issues, and on November 20, he called for peace in another editorial, which was sharply rebutted by the New China Daily the following day. On April 16, 1946, Wang's editorial "The Disgraceful Battle of Changchun" in Ta Kung Pao was countered by the New China Daily on April 18, condemning Ta Kung Pao for blaming the Communists and the Chinese people for the conflict in Changchun and absolving the hardliners of their crimes.

Following the breakdown of Nationalist-Communist negotiations in 1947, Ta Kung Pao began to advocate for a "third way." On January 8, it listed five fundamental beliefs, including political freedom and economic equality; rationality and fairness over passion, dominance, and weapons; the happiness of the majority; support for a democratic multi-party system; and the notion that any revolution must go hand in hand with reform. Yet, supporters of the liberal "middle way" or "third way" were not only suppressed by the Nationalist Party but also criticised by the Communist Party.

== Investigative journalism ==
Ta Kung Pao before 1949 was well known for its investigative journalism. In 1931, Cao Gubing arrived in the Soviet Union as a journalist of Ta Kung Pao, making him the first Chinese journalist to cover the modernisation of the Soviet Union. Starting from July 1935, Fan Changjiang, a Ta Kung Pao, traced the Red Army in their Long March from Sichuan to Shaanxi, making him the first Chinese journalist to cover the Long March. During his travel, he extensively recorded the social, economic and political situation in Northwestern China, leading to great public attention. In 1937, after visits to Yan'an and Xi'an, Fan Changjiang was the first to reveal Chiang Kai-shek's promise to halt the civil war with the Communists during the 1936 Xi'an Incident, forcing Kuomintang to stop the civil war. In 1943, Zhang Gaofeng, a battlefield journalist, extensively reported the Chinese famine of 1942–1943. The newspaper was order to suspend publication for three days after initial reporting.

== News professionalism ==
Ta Kung Pao viewed itself as non-partisan, impartial, and rational. Ta Kung Pao's editorial principles were encapsulated in four key tenets, reflecting its commitment to journalistic integrity and public service:

1. Non-partisanship: The paper positions itself purely from the standpoint of a citizen, expressing opinions without prejudice or affiliation. It supports actions beneficial to the nation and criticizes those harmful, adhering to the interests of the country above all.
2. Not for Sale: Ta Kung Pao declares its editorial independence, not engaging in transactions for opinions and refusing all forms of financial assistance with political strings attached, ensuring that its commentary is influenced neither by monetary incentives nor political investments.
3. No Self-interest: The staff and contributors of the newspaper are dedicated solely to their professional roles within the publication, without ulterior motives. In essence, the newspaper does not serve private interests, aiming to be an open platform for the public voice.
4. Not Blind: Following trends without understanding or engaging in harsh criticism without grasping the facts constitutes blind action and contention. The paper strives for awareness and refuses to succumb to ignorance.

== Reputation ==
In December 1929, Chiang Kai-shek, in his capacity as the Chairman of the National Government, issued a "Decree Seeking Opinions" and specifically directed that Ta Kung Pao and all other newspapers across the country take note of this directive. This move directly catapulted Ta Kung Pao to the center of national public discourse. By the 1930s, there was a saying among the people of Tianjin that "Tianjin has three treasures: Yongli, Nankai, and Ta Kung Pao," highlighting Ta Kung Pao's status as a major opinion stronghold in North China.

In April 1941, Ta Kung Pao received a letter from the United States, being awarded the Missouri Honor Medal for Distinguished Service in Journalism. This marked the first time a Chinese newspaper was recognized as the best newspaper, a milestone celebrated with a tea party hosted by the China Journalism Association and the Chongqing Newspaper Syndicate. Ta Kung Pao was the only foreign media entity to win the award, with Lu Qixin, the Central News Agency's special correspondent in the US, accepting the award on its behalf.

Ta Kung Pao has been heralded as the "Whampoa Military Academy of journalism education," signifying its pivotal role in nurturing journalistic talent and contributing significantly to Chinese media and culture. The roster of authors who contributed to Ta Kung Pao spans the giants of literature and arts, including Hu Shi, Lin Yutang, Cao Yu, Shen Congwen, Feng Zikai, Fei Xiaotong, the master of traditional Chinese painting Huang Yongyu, as well as the martial arts literature masters Jin Yong and Liang Yusheng.

In 1958, during a conversation with Fei Yimin, the president of Hong Kong's Ta Kung Pao, Zhou Enlai commended the newspaper for its patriotic stance against Japanese aggression and praised it for cultivating numerous outstanding talents in China's journalism sector. Ta Kung Pao's reporters include the only Chinese journalist to have reported on-site from the Paris Peace Conference, the first Chinese journalist to enter the border areas after the Red Army reached Shaanxi, and the only Chinese journalist stationed in Europe during World War II. The "Encyclopedia of China - Press and Publishing Volume" lists 108 notable figures in the Chinese journalism sector, with 12 having served at Ta Kung Pao. Additionally, the "China Journalism Yearbook," published by the Journalism Institute of the Chinese Academy of Social Sciences, features biographies of 60 Ta Kung Pao journalists, underscoring the newspaper's significant contribution to the field.

Along with Shenbao (based in Shanghai), Yishibao, and Mingguoribao (a Nationalist daily), Ta Kung Pao is regarded as one of the "four great newspapers of the Republican period".
