= Chen Bulei =

Chinese writer and politician (1890–1948)

- 陳布雷
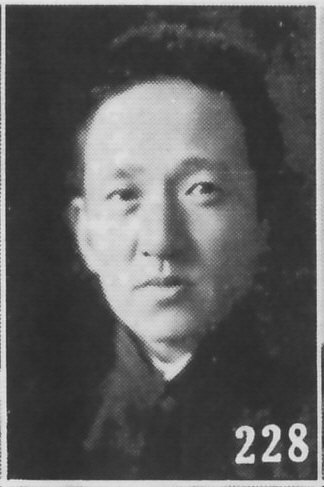
- Image of Chen Bulei featured in The Most Recent Biographies of Chinese Dignitaries, 1941

Personal details
- Born: December 26, 1890 Cixi County, Ningbo Prefecture, Zhejiang Province, Qing Dynasty
- Died: November 13, 1948 (aged 57) Nanjing, China
- Cause of death: Suicide
- Party: Kuomintang
- Spouse(s): Yang Pinxian, Wang Yunmo
- Education: Zhejiang Higher School (predecessor of Zhejiang University)
- Occupation: Various educational and administrative roles in Zhejiang and the Kuomintang

Chen Bulei (Chinese: 陳布雷, 26 December 1890 – 13 November 1948) was a writer, journalist, and politician of the Republic of China. He was a key figure in the Kuomintang and known for his responsibility of drafting important documents, having been conferred the title of Principal Writer (Chinese: 文膽, Wén dǎn), and having been nicknamed "The Kuomintang's First Pen". He was also known to have been a close aide to Chiang Kai-shek.

== Early life ==
Bulei was born into a wealthy agricultural family in the Ningbo Prefecture of Zhejiang Province. His early studies involved preparation for the prefectural and provincial-level examinations, until the Imperial examination system was abolished. In 1904, he joined the Fuman Tongzhishe secret society, which was opposed to the rule of the Qing dynasty, and began activities as a revolutionary. He subsequently enrolled in the Ningbo Prefecture Middle School, and later the preparatory division of the Zhejiang Higher School.

In 1911, Bulei graduated from the Zhejiang Higher School and began working as an editor at Tianduo Bao, a Shanghai-based newspaper. He gained prominence on publishing a series of articles in support of the Wuchang Uprising. In 1920, he began working at a Shanghai-based commercial newspaper as its editor-in-chief.

== Political career ==
In early 1927, Bulei travelled to Nanchang to meet various figures of the Kuomintang. After a meeting with Chiang Kai-shek, who was said to have been impressed with his literary talent and character, he was recruited into the organisation. Later that year in April, he was appointed Secretary-general of the Zhejiang Provincial Government, but in the following month, he was recommended to serve as the secretary-general of the Central Headquarters of the Kuomintang.

In 1929, he attended the Third National Congress of the Kuomintang. Between 1930 and 1934, he served various roles for educational ministries and departments in both Zhejiang and the central government. In the following years, he subsequently served as the deputy secretary-general of the Central Political Council of the Kuomintang. He was also involved in drafting documents and messages sent out, and was later involved in propaganda activities for purposes such as rallying support against Japan at the onset of the Second Sino-Japanese War. He was also responsible for compiling documentations of Kai-shek's daily life and movements; according to protocol, secretaries in Kai-shek's official residence would forward reports from the aide-de-camp on duty to Bulei, who would in turn organise them.

In January 1937, after the Xi'an Incident, Kai-shek flew from Nanjing to Fenghua for a period of recovery, where he was kept company by Bulei and others. In March, the Central Standing Committee of the Kuomintang decided that Bulei and Gu Zhenggang would succeed Shao Yuanchong (who had died in the incident) and Zhu Peide (who had died separately in February from sepsis due to medical malpractice) to their positions in the Kuomintang.

In 1943, he was awarded the Second Grade of the Order of the Cloud and Banner. In 1945, he was awarded the First Grade.

== Later years ==
Following the end of the Second Sino-Japanese War in 1945, Bulei was assigned by Kai-shek to engage in negotiations with various political factions. In March 1948, he was appointed national policy advisor to the Office of the President. However, as the Kuomintang's position in the Chinese Civil War continued to worsen, he grew increasingly despodent.

In his later years, he was said to have been disillusioned by the future of the Kuomintang (particularly due to its alleged corruption) and with himself, feeling that his usefulness had been spent. On November 13, 1948, he committed suicide by taking an overdose of sleeping pills, after leaving letters of explanation to Kai-shek and his family and friends.

== Legacy ==
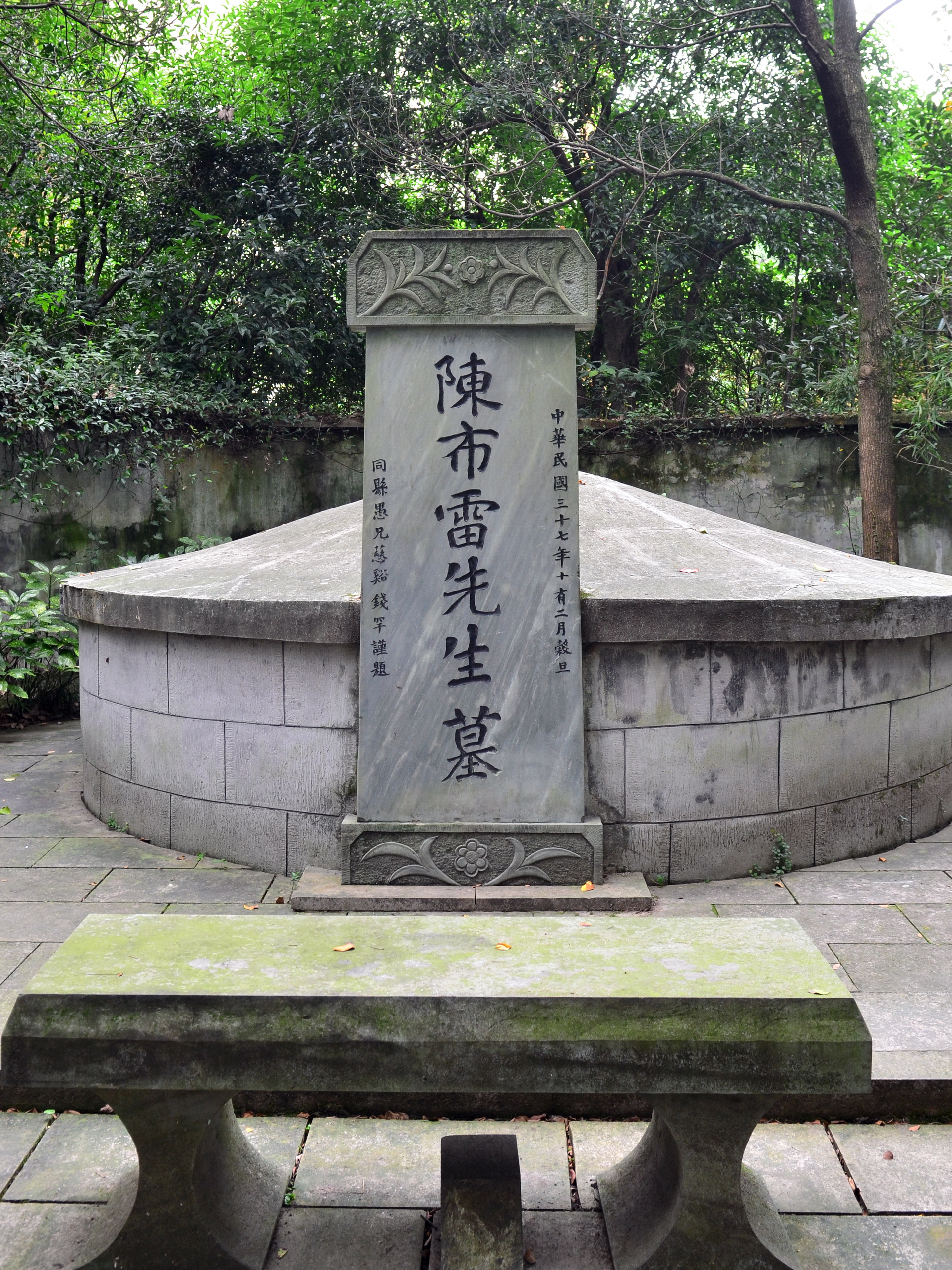
The tomb of Chen Bulei, in Hangzhou

The Central News Agency reported on November 18 that he died of a sudden heart attack, stating that it was caused by an overdose of sleeping pills. It also noted that he had left notes for his wife, brothers, and friends. On November 19 and 20, his funeral committee published his final testament in newspapers in the Beijing-Shanghai regions, and these were also published in his memoirs. Kai-shek and his wife, Soong Mei-Ling, paid their respects at his grave in Hangzhou.

Taiwanese writer Li Ao, after having studied Bulei's memoirs, wrote that his suicide likely stemmed from a mixture of factors: some of his children had defected to the Chinese Communist Party (CCP), he had been unable to persuade Kai-shek to pursue peace negotiations with the CCP, and the Kuomintang had become corrupt to the extent that it had lost the support of the people.

== See also ==
- Chiang Kai-shek
- Kuomintang
