= Hu Zhengzhi =

Chinese newspaper publisher (1889–1949)

胡政之
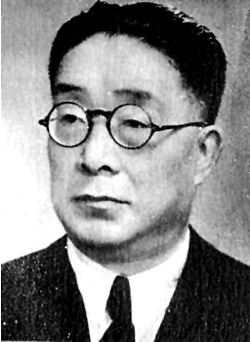
- Born: 1889; Chengdu, Sichuan
- Died: 14 April 1949 (aged 59–60); Shanghai
- Other name: 胡霖
- Education: Tokyo Imperial University
- Occupation: Newspaper editor
- Notable credit(s): Ta Kung Pao editor, proprietor
- Spouse: 顾俊琦(二任)
- Children: 胡濟生、胡冬生、胡燕、胡德生

Hu Zhengzhi or Hu Lin (1889 in Chengdu Sichuan – April 14, 1949 in Shanghai) was a Chinese newspaper publisher and political figure in Republican China. He is best known as the chief editor of the Ta Kung Pao from 1916 to 1923, then as its publisher until his death in 1949. He stood for an independent press and raised professional standards in journalism, but supported the Nationalist government in the Second Sino-Japanese War, and tried to bridge the gap between the Chinese Communist and Nationalist parties after the war.

Hu Zhengzhi was the second of three brothers, the eldest of whom was Hu Xuanzhi. His second wife, Gu Junqi, was the niece of V.K. Wellington Koo. Hu Zhengzhi had five daughters and three sons. Except for Desheng who emigrated to the United States, his other children stayed in China after 1949. Hu Jisheng was the eldest son, the second was Hu Dongsheng; Hu Yan was the daughter of his first wife, while Hu Lan and Hu Desheng were born to Gu Shi.

== Education and early career ==
After home education in the Chinese classics, Hu went on to a modern school, where he studied natural science and mathematics before going to Japan to study law. There he also met his future partners, Wu Dingchang (吴鼎昌 1884-1950) and Zhang Jiluan (张季鸾 1888–1941). When he returned to China in 1911, he passed the Shanghai bar and worked briefly for newspapers associated with Sun Yat-sen used his Japanese language ability as a translator for the Da Gonghe Bao. But when he became editor of the Ta Kung Pao in 1916, he became associated with the Anfu Club, which had just bought a controlling interest in the paper. In the following years he served briefly as a judge, then went to Beijing to teach law and report on events in the capital for the Shanghai papers. When the Japanese government presented the Twenty-One Demands to pressure China into allowing expanded Japanese control, Hu made exclusive reports for his papers using information from Japanese and English language sources.

In 1919 Ta Kung Pao financed a tour that took him to twenty countries. In Paris he covered the Peace Conference of 1919 and threw a reception for fellow journalists that included more than 130 guests from fifteen countries, a larger affair than even the Chinese embassy could host.

== Career in journalism and politics ==
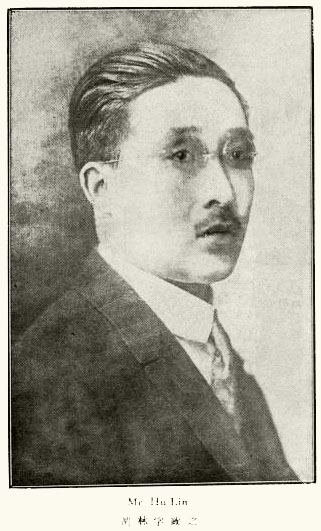
Hu Zhengzhi 1925

In 1926, Hu, Zhang Jiluan, and the banker Wu Dingchang bought all the shares in the paper. Zhang took the role of editor, and Hu was manager and deputy editor. Hu had taken subsidies from Wu, the Anfu Clique and the Nationalists but now wanted the paper to emulate the standards of the Times of London or Japan's Mainichi Shimbun. Wu, as the business head, also held that the paper had to maintain independent funding, talent, and joint efforts. They agreed on a "Four Nos Policy": "no party affiliation, no political endorsements, no self promotion, no ignorance". (budang, busi, bumai, bumang) Hu's social views were pro-Western and in line with the New Culture Movement's suspicion of traditional values, but Zhang's stance was more traditional.

Ta Kung Pao maintained a non-party stance but supported Chiang Kai-shek and the Northern Expedition that brought his Nationalist Party to power. The paper used its relatively safe location in Tianjin to write anti-imperialist and anti-warlord editorials as well as to criticize the new government in Nanjing and become an influential voice of liberal opinion. Hu fostered professional standards with generous salaries and profit sharing, recruiting new staff from reporters who had proved themselves at other agencies. He did not hire those with government or Nationalist Party affiliation, but a number of young reporters had left-wing connections or were even Communist Party members. Zhang Jiluan, whose sympathies were more conservative, however, kept good relations with Chiang Kai-shek, helping to keep the paper from being closed down.

Circulation grew under Hu's management and the editorship of Zhang Jiluan, but the paper was forced to move to Shanghai in 1936 to avoid Japanese control in Tianjin, then to Hankow in 1937, and Chongqing in 1939.He was appointed to the Chinese People's Political Consulative Conference in 1942 and was a member of a delegation to London in 1943, returning to China after a visit to the United States in 1944. After Zhang's death in 1941, Hu's position became more precarious and his politics more outspokenly liberal. He advocated a "constitutional style" of equality before the law, multi-party democracy, and government tolerance of opposition.

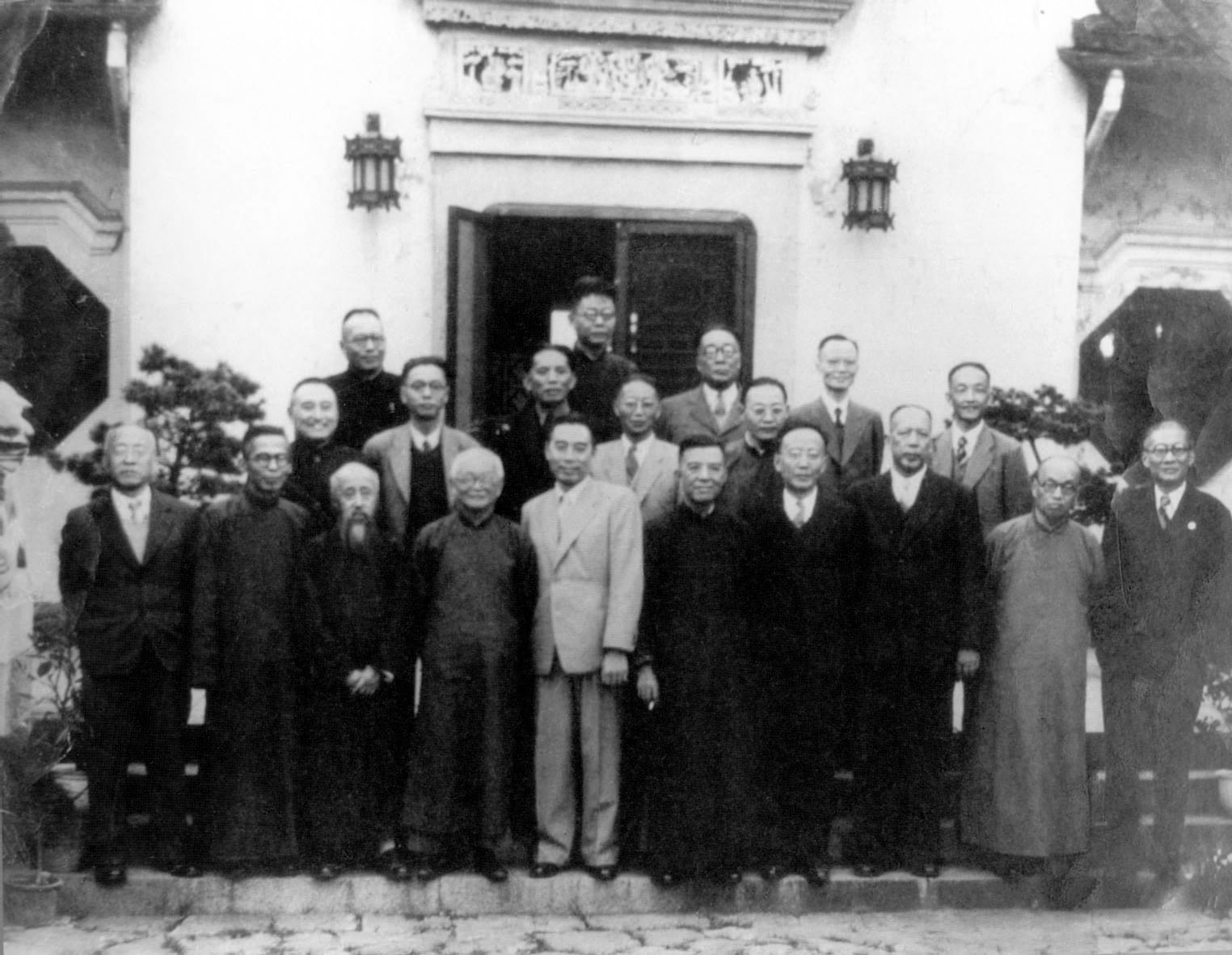
Political Consultative Conference, Chongqing 1946 , Front Row, Zhou Enlai (Center) Hu Zhengzhi (Third from right)

In April 1945, Hu attended the inaugural meeting of the United Nations in San Francisco as a representative of the Chinese press and a member of the Chinese delegation, and signed the United Nations He was a delegate to the Chinese People's Political Consulative Conference, held in Chongqing to try to bring the sides together and head off Civil War. After the Japanese surrender in August, Ta Kung Pao resumed publication in Shanghai and Tianjin, with Hu as chair of the Shanghai general management office. The Hong Kong edition resumed in 1948. The paper published an editorial, "The Liberals' Belief," (Ziyou zhuyizhe de xinnian) opposing continuation of the Civil War and advocating the Third Way. But as the war continued and both Communist and Nationalist supporters attacked the paper, it shifted to a more left-wing stance.

Hu returned to Shanghai, where he died, April 14, 1949, a little more than a month before Communist forces took the city on May 25. After the founding of the People's Republic, Hu came under criticism as a liberal, first for accepting the equivalent of some $US200,000 in subsidies from the Nationalist government and second for his neutral stance.

== Journalistic philosophy ==
Hu was very much aware of journalism's public responsibilities. As one historian puts it, Hu and such colleagues as Zhang Jiluan and Chen Bosheng felt that a reporter must "serve society," and that a journalist much must be both critic and a guide to society, taking on the role of the ancient Confucian tradition. In 1935 he looked back and told his readers that journalism was one of the tools of modern culture, and in China had developed in pretty much the same stages as abroad: from being supported by political patrons to being supported by the market; from literary essays by individual brilliant writers to plentiful and varied features written by stables of writers; from small-scale shops operated by a handful of overworked do-it-alls to a newsrooms made up of specialists; and a readership that had evolved from a small educated social élite toward a mass base. Hu put the question: "why does China have no public opinion?" His answer was that newspapers and magazines in the West were supported by advertisements for middle-class consumer goods, such as soap and home remedies, but the middle class in China was too small to support the independent press that created public opinion.
